= Central Committee of the 12th Congress of the Russian Communist Party (Bolsheviks) =

Central Committee of the 12th Congress
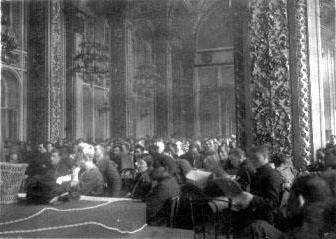
- Meeting hall of the 12th Party Congress

25 April 1923 – 31 May 1924

Leadership
- General Secretary: Joseph Stalin
- Second Secretary: Vyacheslav Molotov
- Inner-groups: Politburo: 7 full & 4 candidates Secretariat: 6 members Orgburo: 9 full & 5 candidates

Candidates

The Central Committee (CC) composition was elected by the 12th Congress, and sat from 25 April 1923 until 31 May 1924. The CC 1st Plenary Session renewed the composition of the Politburo, Secretariat and the Organizational Bureau (OB) of the Russian Communist Party (Bolsheviks).

== Plenums ==
The CC was not a permanent institution. It convened plenary sessions, of which ten CC plenary sessions and one joint CC–Central Control Commission (CCC) plenary sessions were held between the 12th Congress and the 13th Congress. When the CC was not in session, decision-making powers were transferred to inner bodies of the CC itself; the Politburo, Secretariat and Orgburo (none of these bodies were permanent either, but convened several times a months).

Plenary sessions of the Central Committee
Plenum	Date	Length
1st Plenary Session	26 April 1923	1 day
2nd Plenary Session	26–27 June 1923	2 days
3rd Plenary Session	4 July 1923	1 day
4th Plenary Session	23–25 September 1923	3 days
Joint Plenary Session	25–27 October 1923	3 days
5th Plenary Session	14–15 January 1924	2 days
6th Plenary Session	21–22 January 1924	2 days
7th Plenary Session	29, 31 January 1924	2 days
8th Plenary Session	3 February 1924	1 day
9th Plenary Session	31 March – 2 April 1924	3 days
10th Plenary Session	21 May 1924	1 day

== Apparatus ==
Individuals employed by Central Committee's bureaus, departments and newspapers made up the apparatus between the 12th Congress and the 13th Congress. The bureaus and departments were supervised by the Secretariat, and each secretary (member of the Secretariat) supervised a specific department. The leaders of departments were officially referred to as Heads, while the titles of bureau leaders varied between chairman, first secretary and secretary.

Central Committee Apparatus of the 12th Congress of the Russian Communist Party (Bolsheviks)
Institution	Leader	Cyrillic	Took office	Left office	Length of tenure	Nationality	Gender
Accounting and Distribution Department	Vilhelm Knorin	Вильге́льм Кно́рин	25 April 1923	31 May 1924	1 year and 36 days	Latvian	Male
Administrator of Affairs	Ivan Ksenofontov	Иван Ксенофонтов	25 April 1923	31 May 1924	1 year and 36 days	Greek	Male
Agitation and Propaganda Department	Andrei Bubnov	Андрей Бубнов	25 April 1923	31 May 1924	1 year and 36 days	Russian	Male
Bolshevik	Nikolai Bukharin	Никола́й Буха́рин	3 January 1924	31 May 1924	149 days	Russian	Male
Bureau of the Secretariat	—	—	—	—	—	—	—
Central Asian Bureau	Jānis Rudzutaks	Ян Рудзутак	25 April 1923	31 May 1924	1 year and 36 days	Latvian	Male
Department for Work Among Women	Sofia Smidovich	Софья Смидович	25 April 1923	31 May 1924	1 year and 36 days	Russian	Female
Department of Party History	Mikhail Olminsky	Михаил Ольминский	25 April 1923	31 May 1924	1 year and 36 days	Russian	Male
Far Eastern Bureau	Nikolai Kubyak	Николай Кубяк	25 April 1923	31 May 1924	1 year and 36 days	Russian	Male
Finance Department	M.I. Ruski	М. И. Раскин	25 April 1923	31 May 1924	1 year and 36 days	Russian	Male
Head of the Administration of Central Committee Affairs	Alexander Poskrebyshev	Александр Поскрёбышев	25 April 1923	31 May 1924	1 year and 36 days	Russian	Male
North-West Bureau	Ivan Moskvin	Иван Москвин	25 April 1923	31 May 1924	1 year and 36 days	Russian	Male
Organizational and Instructional Department	Lazar Kaganovich	Лазарь Каганович	25 April 1923	27 July 1923	93 days	Jewish	Male
Organizational and Instructional Department	Ivan Korotkov	Иван Коротков	27 July 1923	31 May 1924	309 days	Russian	Male
Pravda	Nikolai Bukharin	Никола́й Буха́рин	25 April 1923	31 May 1924	1 year and 36 days	Russian	Male
Press Department	Yakov Yakovlev	Я́ков Я́ковлев	February 1924	31 May 1924	120 days	Jewish	Male
Siberian Bureau	Stanislav Kosior	Станислав Косиор	25 April 1923	31 May 1924	1 year and 36 days	Polish	Male
South-East Bureau	Anastas Mikoyan	Анастас Микоян	25 April 1923	31 May 1924	1 year and 36 days	Armenian	Male
Statistical Department	Stanislav Strumilin	Станисла́в Струми́лин	25 April 1923	31 May 1924	1 year and 36 days	Russian	Male
Ural Bureau	Moisei Kharitonov	Моисей Харитонов	25 April 1923	1923	250 days	Jewish	Male

== Composition ==
=== Members ===
Members of the Central Committee of the 12th Congress of the Russian Communist Party (Bolsheviks)
Name	Cyrillic	11th CC	13th CC	Birth	Death	PM	Nationality	Gender	Portrait
Andrey Andreyev	Андрей Андреев	Old	Reelected	1895	1971	1914	Russian	Male	
Nikolai Bukharin	Никола́й Буха́рин	Old	Reelected	1888	1938	1906	Russian	Male	
Vlas Chubar	Влас Чубар	Old	Reelected	1891	1939	1907	Ukrainian	Male	
Felix Dzerzhinsky	Фе́ликс Дзержи́нский	Old	Reelected	1877	1926	1906	Polish	Male	
Mikhail Frunze	Михаил Фрунзе	Old	Reelected	1885	1925	1904	Romanian-Russian (Note: His father was Romanian and his mother Russian)	Male	
Mikhail Kalinin	Михаил Калинин	Old	Reelected	1875	1946	1898	Russian	Male	
Lev Kamenev	Лев Ка́менев	Old	Reelected	1883	1936	1901	Jewish-Russian (Note: His father was Jewish and his mother Russian)	Male	
Moisei Kharitonov	Моисей Харитонов	New	Reelected	1887	1938	1905	Jewish	Male	
Sergey Kirov	Серге́й Ки́ров	Candidate	Reelected	1886	1934	1904	Russian	Male	
Nikolay Komarov	Николай Комаров	Candidate	Reelected	1886	1937	1909	Russian	Male	
Ivan Korotkov	Иван Коротков	Old	Not	1885	1949	1905	Russian	Male	—
Nikolai Kubyak	Николай Кубяк	New	Not	1881	1937	1898	Russian	Male	
Emanuel Kviring	Эммануил Квиринг	New	Reelected	1888	1937	1912	Volga German	Male	
Mikhail Lashevich	Александр Криницкий	New	Reelected	1884	1937	1901	Jewish	Male	
Vladimir Lenin	Владимир Ленин	Old	Died	1870	1924	1898	Russian	Male	
Dmitry Manuilsky	Дмитро Мануїльський	Candidate	Reelected	1883	1959	1903	Ukrainian	Male	
Vasily Mikhailov	Василий Михайлов	Candidate	Reelected	1894	1937	1915	Russian	Male	
Anastas Mikoyan	Анастас Микоян	Candidate	Reelected	1895	1978	1915	Armenian	Male	
Vyacheslav Molotov	Вячеслав Молотов	Old	Reelected	1890	1986	1906	Russian	Male	
Grigol Ordzhonikidze	Григо́рий Орджоники́дзе	Old	Reelected	1886	1937	1903	Georgian	Male	
Grigory Petrovsky	Григо́рій Петро́вський	Old	Reelected	1878	1958	1898	Ukrainian	Male	a bearded man with wavy hair, wearing glasses and what seems to be a suit, a white tie, and a black and white dotted shirt
Georgy Pyatakov	Юрій П'ятаков	Candidate	Reelected	1890	1937	1910	Russian	Male	
Karl Radek	Карл Радек	Old	Not	1885	1939	1903	Jewish	Male	
Christian Rakovsky	Христиан Раковский	Old	Reelected	1873	1941	1917	Bulgarian	Male	
Jānis Rudzutaks	Ян Рудзутак	Old	Reelected	1887	1938	1905	Latvian	Male	
Alexei Rykov	Алексей Рыков	Old	Reelected	1881	1938	1899	Russian	Male	
Alexander Smirnov	Александр Смирнов	Old	Reelected	1878	1938	1898	Russian	Male	
Grigori Sokolnikov	Григорий Сокольников	Old	Reelected	1888	1938	1905	Jewish	Male	
Joseph Stalin	Ио́сиф Ста́лин	Old	Reelected	1878	1953	1898	Georgian	Male	
Daniil Sulimov	Даниил Сулимов	Candidate	Reelected	1890	1937	1905	Russian	Male	
Mikhail Tomsky	Михаил Томский	Old	Reelected	1880	1936	1904	Russian	Male	
Leon Trotsky	Лев Тро́цкий	Old	Reelected	1879	1940	1917	Jewish	Male	
Alexander Tsiurupa	Алекса́ндр Цюру́па	New	Reelected	1870	1928	1898	Ukrainian	Male	
Nikolai Uglanov	Николай Угланов	New	Reelected	1886	1937	1907	Russian	Male	
Konstantin Ukhanov	Константин Уханов	New	Reelected	1891	1937	1907	Russian	Male	
Kliment Voroshilov	Климент Ворошилов	Old	Reelected	1881	1969	1903	Russian	Male	
Grigory Yevdokimov	Григорий Евдокимов	New	Reelected	1884	1936	1903	Russian	Male	
Isaak Zelensky	Исаак Зеленский	Old	Reelected	1890	1937	1906	Jewish	Male	
Pyotr Zalutsky	Петро Залуцький	New	Reelected	1887	1937	1907	Russian	Male	
Grigory Zinoviev	Григо́рий Зино́вьев	Old	Reelected	1883	1936	1901	Jewish	Male	

=== Candidates ===
Candidate Members of the Central Committee of the 12th Congress of the Russian Communist Party (Bolsheviks)
Name	Cyrillic	11th CC	13th CC	Birth	Death	PM	Nationality	Gender	Portrait
Aleksei Badayev	Алексей Бадаев	Candidate	Candidate	1883	1951	1904	Russian	Male	
Andrei Bubnov	Андрей Бубнов	Candidate	Member	1884	1938	1903	Russian	Male	
Mikhail Chudov	Михаил Чудов	New	Candidate	1893	1937	1913	Russian	Male	—
Lazar Kaganovich	Лазарь Каганович	New	Member	1893	1991	1911	Jewish	Male	
Nikolay Kolotilov	Николай Колотилов	New	Member	1885	1937	1903	Russian	Male	—
Stanislav Kosior	Станислав Косиор	New	Member	1889	1939	1907	Polish	Male	
Dmitry Lebed	Дмитрий Лебедь	Candidate	Not	1893	1937	1909	Russian	Male	
Ivan Lepse	Иван Лепсе	Candidate	Not	1889	1929	1904	Latvian	Male	—
Alexander Miasnikian	Александр Мясников	New	Candidate	1886	1925	1906	Armenian	Male	
Ivan Morozov	Иван Морозов	New	Candidate	1889	1957	1908	Russian	Male	—
Ivan Moskvin	Иван Москвин	New	Candidate	1890	1937	1911	Russian	Male	
Nariman Narimanov	Нарима́нов Нарима́н	New	Candidate	1870	1925	1905	Azerbaijani	Male	
Mamia Orakhelashvili	Мамия Орахелашвили	New	Candidate	1888	1937	1903	Georgian	Male	
Ivan Rumyantsev	Иван Румянцев	New	Member	1886	1937	1905	Russian	Male	
Turar Ryskulov	Турар Рыскулов	New	Not	1894	1938	1917	Kazakh	Male	
Mykola Skrypnyk	Микола Скрипник	New	Candidate	1872	1933	1898	Ukrainian	Male	
Mikhail Uryvayev	Михаил Урываев	New	Candidate	1887	1937	1917	Russian	Male	—
