= Central Committee of the 11th Congress of the Russian Communist Party (Bolsheviks) =

Supreme political authority in Soviet Union 1922–1923

Central Committee of the 11th Congress
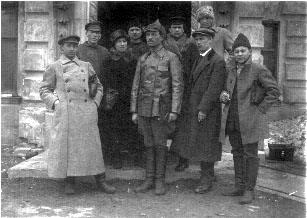
- Delegates at the 11th Party Congress

2 April 1922 – 25 April 1923

Leadership
- General Secretary: Joseph Stalin
- Second Secretary: Vyacheslav Molotov
- Inner-groups: Politburo: 7 full & 3 candidates Secretariat: 3 members Orgburo: 7 full & 3 candidates

Candidates

The Central Committee (CC) composition was elected by the 11th Congress, and sat from 2 April 1922 until 25 April 1923 . The CC 1st Plenary Session renewed the composition of the Politburo, Secretariat and the Organizational Bureau (OB) of the Russian Communist Party (Bolsheviks).

== Plenums ==
The CC was not a permanent institution. It convened nine plenary sessions between the 11th Congress and the 12th Congress. When the CC was not in session, decision-making powers were transferred to inner bodies of the CC itself; the Politburo, Secretariat and Orgburo (none of these bodies were permanent either, but convened several times a months).

Plenary sessions of the Central Committee
Plenum	Date	Length
1st Plenary Session	3 April 1922	1 day
2nd Plenary Session	16 May 1922	1 day
3rd Plenary Session	2 August 1922	1 day
4th Plenary Session	8 August 1922	1 day
5th Plenary Session	5–7 October 1922	3 days
6th Plenary Session	18 December 1922	1 day
7th Plenary Session	21–24 February 1923	4 days
8th Plenary Session	30–31 March 1923	2 days
9th Plenary Session	15 April 1923	1 day

== Apparatus ==
Individuals employed by Central Committee's bureaus, departments and newspapers made up the apparatus between the 11th Congress and the 12th Congress. The bureaus and departments were supervised by the Secretariat, and each secretary (member of the Secretariat) supervised a specific department. The leaders of departments were officially referred to as Heads, while the titles of bureau leaders varied between chairman, first secretary and secretary.

Central Committee Apparatus of the 11th Congress of the Russian Communist Party (Bolsheviks)
Institution	Leader	Cyrillic	Took office	Left office	Length of tenure	Nationality	Gender
Accounting and Distribution Department	Sergey Syrtsov	Серге́й Сырцо́в	2 April 1922	25 April 1923	1 year and 23 days	Russian	Male
Administrator of Affairs	Ivan Ksenofontov	Иван Ксенофонтов	2 April 1922	25 April 1923	1 year and 23 days	Greek	Male
Agitation and Propaganda Department	Andrei Bubnov	Андрей Бубнов	2 April 1922	25 April 1923	1 year and 23 days	Russian	Male
Bureau of the Secretariat	Amayak Nazaretyan	Амаяк Назаретян	2 April 1922	25 April 1923	1 year and 23 days	Armenian	Male
Central Asian Bureau	Jānis Rudzutaks	Ян Рудзутак	2 April 1922	25 April 1923	1 year and 23 days	Latvian	Male
Department for Work Among Women	Sofia Smidovich	Софья Смидович	2 April 1922	25 April 1923	1 year and 23 days	Russian	Female
Department of Party History	Mikhail Olminsky	Михаил Ольминский	2 April 1922	25 April 1923	1 year and 23 days	Russian	Male
Far Eastern Bureau	Nikolay Kubiak	Николай Кубяк	2 April 1922	25 April 1923	1 year and 23 days	Russian	Male
Finance Department	—	—	—	—	—	—	—
Organizational and Instructional Department	Nikolai Lisitsyn	Николай Лисицын	2 April 1922	June 1922	89 days	Russian	Male
Organizational and Instructional Department	Lazar Kaganovich	Лазарь Каганович	June 1922	25 April 1923	1 year and 27 days	Jewish	Male
Siberian Bureau	Stanislav Kosior	Станислав Косиор	2 April 1922	25 April 1923	1 year and 23 days	Polish	Male
South-Eastern Bureau	Anastas Mikoyan	Анастас Микоян	2 April 1922	25 April 1923	1 year and 23 days	Armenian	Male
Statistical Department	Stanislav Strumilin	Станисла́в Струми́лин	2 April 1922	25 April 1923	1 year and 23 days	Russian	Male
Ural Bureau	Timofei Sapronov	Тимофе́й Сапро́нов	2 April 1922	25 April 1923	1 year and 23 days	Russian	Male
Ural Industrial Bureau	Daniil Sulimov	Даниил Сулимов	2 April 1922	25 April 1923	1 year and 23 days	Russian	Male

== Composition ==
=== Members ===
Members of the Central Committee of the 11th Congress of the Russian Communist Party (Bolsheviks)
Name	Cyrillic	10th CC	12th CC	Birth	Death	PM	Nationality	Gender	Portrait
Andrey Andreyev	Андрей Андреев	New	Reelected	1895	1971	1914	Russian	Male	
Nikolai Bukharin	Никола́й Буха́рин	Old	Reelected	1888	1938	1906	Russian	Male	
Vlas Chubar	Влас Чубар	Candidate	Reelected	1891	1939	1907	Ukrainian	Male	
Felix Dzerzhinsky	Фе́ликс Дзержи́нский	Old	Reelected	1877	1926	1906	Polish	Male	
Mikhail Frunze	Михаил Фрунзе	Old	Reelected	1885	1925	1904	Romanian-Russian (Note: His father was Romanian and his mother Russian)	Male	
Mikhail Kalinin	Михаил Калинин	Old	Reelected	1875	1946	1898	Russian	Male	
Lev Kamenev	Лев Ка́менев	Old	Reelected	1883	1936	1901	Jewish-Russian (Note: His father was Jewish and his mother Russian)	Male	
Ivan Korotkov	Иван Коротков	New	Reelected	1885	1949	1905	Russian	Male	—
Valerian Kuybyshev	Валериан Куйбышев	Candidate	Not	1888	1935	1904	Russian	Male	
Vladimir Lenin	Владимир Ленин	Old	Reelected	1870	1924	1898	Russian	Male	
Vyacheslav Molotov	Вячеслав Молотов	Old	Reelected	1890	1986	1906	Russian	Male	
Grigol Ordzhonikidze	Григо́рий Орджоники́дзе	Old	Reelected	1886	1937	1903	Georgian	Male	
Grigory Petrovsky	Григо́рій Петро́вський	Old	Reelected	1878	1958	1898	Ukrainian	Male	a bearded man with wavy hair, wearing glasses and what seems to be a suit, a white tie, and a black and white dotted shirt
Karl Radek	Карл Радек	Old	Reelected	1885	1939	1903	Jewish	Male	
Christian Rakovsky	Христиан Раковский	Old	Reelected	1873	1941	1917	Bulgarian	Male	
Jānis Rudzutaks	Ян Рудзутак	Old	Reelected	1887	1938	1905	Latvian	Male	
Alexei Rykov	Алексей Рыков	Old	Reelected	1881	1938	1899	Russian	Male	
Timofei Sapronov	Тимофе́й Сапро́нов	New	Not	1887	1937	1898	Russian	Male	
Alexander Smirnov	Александр Смирнов	New	Reelected	1878	1938	1898	Russian	Male	
Grigori Sokolnikov	Григорий Сокольников	New	Reelected	1888	1938	1905	Jewish	Male	
Joseph Stalin	Ио́сиф Ста́лин	Old	Reelected	1878	1953	1898	Georgian	Male	
Mikhail Tomsky	Михаил Томский	Old	Reelected	1880	1936	1904	Russian	Male	
Leon Trotsky	Лев Тро́цкий	Old	Reelected	1879	1940	1917	Jewish	Male	
Kliment Voroshilov	Климент Ворошилов	Old	Reelected	1881	1969	1903	Russian	Male	
Yemelyan Yaroslavsky	Емельян Ярославский	Old	Not	1878	1943	1898	Jewish	Male	
Isaak Zelensky	Исаак Зеленский	Candidate	Reelected	1890	1937	1906	Jewish	Male	
Grigory Zinoviev	Григо́рий Зино́вьев	Old	Reelected	1883	1936	1901	Jewish	Male	

=== Candidates ===
Candidate Members of the Central Committee of the 11th Congress of the Russian Communist Party (Bolsheviks)
Name	Cyrillic	10th CC	12th CC	Birth	Death	PM	Nationality	Gender	Portrait
Aleksei Badayev	Алексей Бадаев	New	Candidate	1883	1951	1904	Russian	Male	
Andrei Bubnov	Андрей Бубнов	New	Candidate	1884	1938	1903	Russian	Male	
Sergey Gusev	Сергей Гусев	Candidate	Not	1874	1933	1898	Jewish	Male	
Sergey Kirov	Серге́й Ки́ров	Candidate	Member	1886	1934	1904	Russian	Male	
Aleksei Kiselyov	Алексей Киселёв	Candidate	Not	1879	1937	1898	Russian	Male	
Nikolay Komarov	Николай Комаров	Member	Member	1886	1937	1909	Russian	Male	
Timofei Krivov	Тимофей Кривов	New	Not	1886	1966	1905	Chuvash	Male	—
Dmitry Lebed	Дмитрий Лебедь	New	Candidate	1893	1937	1909	Russian	Male	
Ivan Lepse	Иван Лепсе	New	Candidate	1889	1929	1904	Latvian	Male	—
Semyon Lobov	Семён Лобов	New	Not	1888	1937	1913	Russian	Male	—
Dmitry Manuilsky	Дмитро Мануїльський	New	Member	1883	1959	1903	Ukrainian	Male	
Vasily Mikhailov	Василий Михайлов	Member	Member	1894	1937	1915	Russian	Male	
Anastas Mikoyan	Анастас Микоян	New	Member	1895	1978	1915	Armenian	Male	
Georgy Pyatakov	Юрій П'ятаков	New	Member	1890	1937	1910	Russian	Male	
Abdullo Rakhimbayev	Абдулло Рахимбаев	New	Not	1896	1938	1919	Uzbek	Male	
Georgy Safarov	Георгий Сафаров	Candidate	Not	1891	1942	1908	Armenian-Polish	Male	
Vasily Schmidt	Василий Шмидт	Candidate	Not	1886	1938	1905	German	Male	
Ivar Smilga	Ивар Смилга	New	Not	1892	1938	1907	Latvian	Male	
Daniil Sulimov	Даниил Сулимов	Candidate	Member	1890	1937	1905	Russian	Male	
