= Central Committee of the 10th Congress of the Russian Communist Party (Bolsheviks) =

Central Committee of the 10th Congress
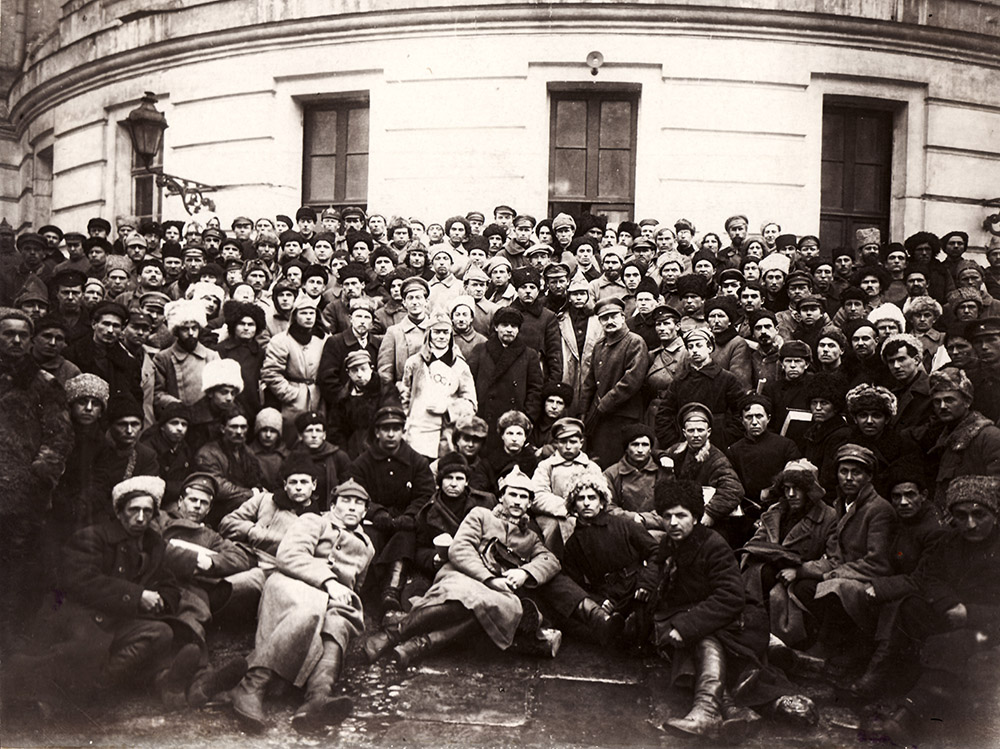
- Vladimir Lenin, Leon Trotsky and Kliment Voroshilov standing with delegates to the 10th Party Congress

16 March 1921 – 2 April 1922
- Responsible Secretary: Vyacheslav Molotov
- Inner-groups: Politburo: 7 full & 3 candidates Secretariat: 3 members Orgburo: 7 full & 3 candidates

Candidates

The Central Committee (CC) composition was elected by the 10th Congress, and sat from 16 March 1921 until 2 April 1922. The CC 1st Plenary Session renewed the composition of the Politburo, Secretariat and the Organizational Bureau (OB) of the Russian Communist Party (Bolsheviks).

== Plenums ==
The CC was not a permanent institution. It convened plenary sessions, of which nine CC plenary sessions and one joint CC–Central Control Commission (CCC) plenary sessions were held between the 10th Congress and the 11th Congress. When the CC was not in session, decision-making powers were transferred to inner bodies of the CC itself; the Politburo, Secretariat and Orgburo (none of these bodies were permanent either, but convened several times a months).

Plenary sessions of the Central Committee
Plenum	Date	Length
1st Plenary Session	16 March 1921	1 day
2nd Plenary Session	16–18 May 1921	3 days
3rd Plenary Session	28 May 1921	1 day
4th Plenary Session	8 August 1921	1 day
1st Joint Plenary Session	9 August 1921	1 day
5th Plenary Session	9 August 1921	1 day
6th Plenary Session	10 August 1921	1 day
7th Plenary Session	18 December 1921	1 day
8th Plenary Session	28 December 1921	1 day
9th Plenary Session	25 March 1922	1 day

== Apparatus ==
Individuals employed by Central Committee's bureaus, departments and newspapers made up the apparatus between the 10th Congress and the 11th Congress. The bureaus and departments were supervised by the Secretariat, and each secretary (member of the Secretariat) supervised a specific department. The leaders of departments were officially referred to as Heads, while the titles of bureau leaders varied between chairman, first secretary and secretary.

Central Committee Apparatus of the 10th Congress of the Russian Communist Party (Bolsheviks)
Institution	Leader	Cyrillic	Took office	Left office	Length of tenure	Nationality	Gender
Accounting and Distribution Department	Sergey Syrtsov	Серге́й Сырцо́в	16 March 1921	2 April 1922	1 year and 17 days	Russian	Male
Administrator of Affairs	Pavel Gorbunov	Павел Горбунов	16 March 1921	2 April 1922	1 year and 17 days	Russian	Male
Agitation and Propaganda Department	Lev Sosnovsky	Лев Сосновский	16 March 1921	2 April 1922	1 year and 17 days	Jewish	Male
Bureau of the Secretariat	Nikolay Smirnov	Николай Смирнов	16 March 1921	2 April 1922	1 year and 17 days	Russian	Male
Caucasian Bureau	Grigol Ordzhonikidze	Григо́рий Орджоники́дзе	16 March 1921	2 April 1922	1 year and 17 days	Georgian	Male
Department for Work Among Women	Alexandra Kollontai	Алекса́ндра Коллонта́й	16 March 1921	2 April 1922	1 year and 17 days	Ukrainian-Finnish (Note: Her father was Ukrainian and her mother Finnish)	Female
Department of Party History	Mikhail Olminsky	Михаил Ольминский	16 March 1921	2 April 1922	1 year and 17 days	Russian	Male
Far Eastern Bureau	Pyotr Anokhin	Пётр Анохин	16 March 1921	2 April 1922	1 year and 17 days	Russian	Male
Finance Department	—	—	—	—	—	—	—
Organizational and Instructional Department	Pyotr Zalutsky	Петро Залуцький	16 March 1921	2 April 1922	1 year and 17 days	Russian	Male
Siberian Bureau	Ivan Smirnov	Иван Смирнов	16 March 1921	2 April 1922	1 year and 17 days	Russian	Male
South-East Bureau	Anastas Mikoyan	Анастас Микоян	16 March 1921	2 April 1922	1 year and 17 days	Armenian	Male
Statistical Department	Stanislav Strumilin	Станисла́в Струми́лин	16 March 1921	2 April 1922	1 year and 17 days	Russian	Male
Turkestan Bureau	Georgy Safarov	Георгий Сафаров	16 March 1921	2 April 1922	1 year and 17 days	Armenian-Polish	Male
Ural Bureau	Ivan Tuntul	Иван Тунтул	16 March 1921	2 April 1922	1 year and 17 days	Latvian	Male
Ural Industrial Bureau	Daniil Sulimov	Даниил Сулимов	16 March 1921	2 April 1922	1 year and 17 days	Russian	Male

== Composition ==
=== Members ===
Members of the Central Committee of the 10th Congress of the Russian Communist Party (Bolsheviks)
Name	Cyrillic	9th CC	11th CC	Birth	Death	PM	Nationality	Gender	Portrait
Nikolai Bukharin	Никола́й Буха́рин	Old	Reelected	1888	1938	1906	Russian	Male	
Felix Dzerzhinsky	Фе́ликс Дзержи́нский	Old	Reelected	1877	1926	1906	Polish	Male	
Mikhail Frunze	Михаил Фрунзе	New	Reelected	1885	1925	1904	Romanian-Russian (Note: His father was Romanian and his mother Russian)	Male	
Mikhail Kalinin	Михаил Калинин	Old	Reelected	1875	1946	1898	Russian	Male	
Lev Kamenev	Лев Ка́менев	Old	Reelected	1883	1936	1901	Jewish-Russian (Note: His father was Jewish and his mother Russian)	Male	
Nikolay Komarov	Николай Комаров	New	Candidate	1886	1937	1909	Russian	Male	
Ivan Kutuzov	Иван Кутузов	New	Not	1885	1937	1906	Russian	Male	—
Vladimir Lenin	Владимир Ленин	Old	Reelected	1870	1924	1898	Russian	Male	
Vasily Mikhailov	Василий Михайлов	Old	Not	1894	1937	1915	Russian	Male	
Vyacheslav Molotov	Вячеслав Молотов	Candidate	Reelected	1890	1986	1906	Russian	Male	
Grigol Ordzhonikidze	Григо́рий Орджоники́дзе	New	Reelected	1886	1937	1903	Georgian	Male	
Grigory Petrovsky	Григо́рій Петро́вський	Candidate	Reelected	1878	1958	1898	Ukrainian	Male	a bearded man with wavy hair, wearing glasses and what seems to be a suit, a white tie, and a black and white dotted shirt
Karl Radek	Карл Радек	Old	Reelected	1885	1939	1903	Jewish	Male	
Christian Rakovsky	Христиан Раковский	Old	Reelected	1873	1941	1917	Bulgarian	Male	
Jānis Rudzutaks	Ян Рудзутак	Old	Reelected	1887	1938	1905	Latvian	Male	
Alexei Rykov	Алексей Рыков	Old	Reelected	1881	1938	1899	Russian	Male	
Fyodor Sergeyev	Фёдор Серге́ев	Old	Not	1895	1921	1914	Russian	Male	
Alexander Shliapnikov	Алекса́ндр Шля́пников	New	Not	1885	1937	1901	Russian	Male	
Joseph Stalin	Ио́сиф Ста́лин	Old	Reelected	1878	1953	1898	Georgian	Male	
Mikhail Tomsky	Михаил Томский	Old	Reelected	1880	1936	1904	Russian	Male	
Leon Trotsky	Лев Тро́цкий	Old	Reelected	1879	1940	1917	Jewish	Male	
Ivan Tuntul	Иван Тунтул	New	Not	1892	1938	1907	Latvian	Male	—
Kliment Voroshilov	Климент Ворошилов	New	Reelected	1881	1969	1903	Russian	Male	
Yemelyan Yaroslavsky	Емельян Ярославский	Candidate	Reelected	1878	1943	1898	Jewish	Male	
Grigory Zinoviev	Григо́рий Зино́вьев	Old	Reelected	1883	1936	1901	Jewish	Male	

=== Candidates ===
Candidate Members of the Central Committee of the 10th Congress of the Russian Communist Party (Bolsheviks)
Name	Cyrillic	9th CC	11th CC	Birth	Death	PM	Nationality	Gender	Portrait
Vlas Chubar	Влас Чубар	New	Member	1891	1939	1907	Ukrainian	Male	
Sergey Gusev	Сергей Гусев	Candidate	Candidate	1874	1933	1898	Jewish	Male	
Sergey Kirov	Серге́й Ки́ров	New	Candidate	1886	1934	1904	Russian	Male	
Aleksei Kiselyov	Алексей Киселёв	New	Candidate	1879	1937	1898	Russian	Male	
Valerian Kuybyshev	Валериан Куйбышев	New	Member	1888	1935	1904	Russian	Male	
Vladimir Milyutin	Владимир Милютин	Candidate	Not	1884	1937	1910	Russian	Male	
Valerian Osinsky	Валериан Оболенский	New	Not	1887	1938	1907	Russian	Male	
Georgy Safarov	Георгий Сафаров	New	Candidate	1891	1942	1908	Armenian-Polish	Male	
Vasily Schmidt	Василий Шмидт	New	Candidate	1886	1938	1905	German	Male	
Ivan Smirnov	Иван Смирнов	New	Not	1881	1936	1899	Russian	Male	
Daniil Sulimov	Даниил Сулимов	New	Candidate	1890	1937	1905	Russian	Male	
Nikolai Uglanov	Николай Угланов	New	Not	1886	1937	1907	Russian	Male	
Pyotr Zalutsky	Петро Залуцький	Candidate	Not	1887	1937	1907	Russian	Male	
Isaak Zelensky	Исаак Зеленский	New	Member	1890	1937	1906	Jewish	Male	
