= Orgburo of the 10th Congress of the Russian Communist Party (Bolsheviks) =

Organisational Bureau of Soviet Union (1921–22)

The 10th Orgburo of the Russian Communist Party (Bolsheviks) was elected by the 1st plenary session of the 10th Central Committee in the immediate aftermath of the 10th Congress.

== Full members ==
Name (birth–death)	Took office	Left office	Duration	Note
Nikolay Komarov (1886–1937)	16 March 1921	9 August 1921	146 days	Relieved of his duties at 1st Joint Plenary Session of the Central Committee and the Central Control Commission.
Vasily Mikhailov (1894–1937)	16 March 1921	3 April 1922	1 year, 18 days	—
Vyacheslav Molotov (1890–1986)	16 March 1921	3 April 1922	1 year, 18 days	—
Alexey Rykov (1881–1938)	16 March 1921	3 April 1922	1 year, 18 days	—
Joseph Stalin (1878–1953)	16 March 1921	3 April 1922	1 year, 18 days	—
Mikhail Tomsky (1880–1936)	16 March 1921	9 August 1921	146 days	Relieved of his duties at 1st Joint Plenary Session of the Central Committee and the Central Control Commission.
Yemelyan Yaroslavsky (1875–1946)	16 March 1921	9 August 1921	146 days	Relieved of his duties at 1st Joint Plenary Session of the Central Committee and the Central Control Commission.
Felix Dzerzhinsky (1873–1959)	9 August 1921	3 April 1922	237 days	Elected full member at 1st Joint Plenary Session of the Central Committee and the Central Control Commission.
Jānis Rudzutaks (1873–1959)	9 August 1921	3 April 1922	237 days	Elected full member at 1st Joint Plenary Session of the Central Committee and the Central Control Commission.
Pyotr Zalutsky (1873–1959)	9 August 1921	3 April 1922	237 days	Elected at the 1st Joint Plenary Session of the Central Committee and the Central Control Commission.

== Candidate members ==
Name (birth–death)	Took office	Left office	Duration	Note
Felix Dzerzhinsky (1873–1959)	16 March 1921	9 August 1921	146 days	Elected full member at 1st Joint Plenary Session of the Central Committee and the Central Control Commission.
Mikhail Kalinin (1875–1946)	16 March 1921	3 April 1922	1 year, 18 days	—
Jānis Rudzutaks (1873–1959)	16 March 1921	9 August 1921	146 days	Elected full member at 1st Joint Plenary Session of the Central Committee and the Central Control Commission.
Pyotr Zalutsky (1873–1959)	28 May 1921	9 August 1921	73 days	Elected at the 3rd Plenary Session, and relieved of his duties at the 1st Joint Plenary Session of the Central Committee and the Central Control Commission.
Ivan Kutuzov (1885–1937)	28 May 1921	3 April 1922	310 days	Elected at the 3rd Plenary Session.
Vasily Schmidt (1886–1938)	28 May 1921	3 April 1922	310 days	Elected at the 3rd Plenary Session.
Ivan Tuntul (1892–1938)	1 March 1922	3 April 1922	33 days	Appointed to the Orgburo on a decision made by the 10th Politburo.
