= Kremlin Plot =

1935 attempt to assassinate Stalin

The Kremlin Plot (Russian: Кремлёвское дело) is a 1935 criminal case in the Soviet Union about an assassination attempt on Joseph Stalin, which preceded the Great Purge.

In March 1935, the leading conspirator Mikhail Cherniavsky confessed that he was part of a 'terrorist' assassination plot organized after the Kirov affair in the belief that equally poor security in the Kremlin could enable the conspirators to smuggle in pistols and shoot Stalin. No evidence shows that Cherniavsky was tortured, but he was persuaded to admit that he had been allegedly recruited by an American Trotskyist named Ryaskin when he was studying abroad in the Massachusetts Institute of Technology (MIT).

== Plot ==
After the assassination of Sergei Kirov in December 1934, the investigation led to the discovery of a plot in early 1935 to kill Joseph Stalin besides poor security measures for the Kremlin and harsh criticism of Stalin from the Kremlin working staff.

In total, 110 people were investigated by the NKVD and only six of them made significant confessions of involvement. The leading conspirator was Mikhail Cherniavsky, a military Fourth Department officer who lost his Communist faith while studying chemistry at the Massachusetts Institute of Technology undercover. He became convinced that the Stalinist command economy could never compete with American capitalism and that it was necessary to replace Stalin as Soviet leader. On March 26, he confessed that he was part of a 'terrorist' assassination plot organized after the Kirov affair in the belief that equally poor security in the Kremlin could enable them to smuggle in pistols and shoot Stalin. No evidence shows that he was tortured, but he was persuaded to admit that he had been allegedly recruited by an American Trotskyist named Ryaskin when he was in America. When asked about the details two days later, he could provide none. Among the arrested was Nikolai Rosenfeld, Lev Kamenev's brother and his nephew, an engineer at the Moscow power plant.

Pressure to execute the plotters came from the NKVD and its head, Genrikh Yagoda, rather than Stalin himself. Unlike his later curt agreement with execution requests, Stalin only agreed with the execution of two people among a total of twenty-six people whose death was demanded. One was Mikhail Cherniavsky and the other was Alexei Sinelobov, a deputy commandant of the Kremlin, whose sentence was later commuted to 10 years' imprisonment.

== Aftermath ==
Along with the investigation, in February, Avel Yenukidze, then Secretary of the All-Russian Central Executive Committee was removed from the post, by which the security of the Kremlin was supposed to be ensured. Rudolf Augustovich Peterson also lost his post due to the case. On March 21, the Politburo sent the members of the Central Committee and commissions of the party and Soviet control the "Report of the Central Committee of the All-Union Communist Party of Bolsheviks on the apparatus of the Central Executive Committee of the USSR and comrade. Yenukidze". The report was delivered by Nikolai Yezhov. In the report, Avel Yenukidze was accused of failing to exercise sufficient political vigilance. It was also claimed that the assassination attempt also involved Kamenev, Zinoviev, Trotsky, as well as the Mensheviks and White Guards.

On May 4, Joseph Stalin delivered a speech in the Kremlin to the graduates from the Red Army Academies, in which he referred to Cherniavsky's bullets and said "These comrades did not always confine themselves to criticism and passive resistance. They threatened to raise a revolt in the Party against the Central Committee. More, they threatened some of us with bullets. Evidently, they reckoned on frightening us and compelling us to turn from the Leninist road."

== Relevant research ==
Relevant research was conducted by Svetlana Lokhova, whose probe into voluminous Soviet archives shed important light on the motivations of Stalin before the Great Purge.
