= Politburo of the 13th Congress of the All-Union Communist Party (Bolsheviks) =

Communist party executive committee

13th Politburo
- 12th Politburo ← → 14th Politburo
- Duration: 2 June 1924 – 1 January 1926

The Politburo of the 13th Congress of the All-Union Communist Party (Bolsheviks) was in session from 2 June 1924 to 1 January 1926.

== Composition ==
=== Members ===
Members of the Politburo of the 13th Congress of the All-Union Communist Party (Bolsheviks)
Name	Cyrillic	12th POL	14th POL	Birth	Death	PM	Ethnicity	Gender	Portrait
Nikolai Bukharin	Никола́й Буха́рин	Candidate	Reelected	1888	1938	1906	Russian	Male	
Lev Kamenev	Лев Ка́менев	Old	Reelected	1883	1936	1901	Jewish-Russian (Note: His father was Jewish and his mother Russian)	Male	
Alexei Rykov	Алексей Рыков	Old	Reelected	1881	1938	1898	Russian	Male	
Joseph Stalin	Ио́сиф Ста́лин	Old	Reelected	1878	1953	1898	Georgian	Male	
Mikhail Tomsky	Михаил Томский	Old	Reelected	1880	1936	1904	Russian	Male	
Leon Trotsky	Лев Тро́цкий	Old	Reelected	1879	1940	1917	Jewish	Male	
Grigory Zinoviev	Григо́рий Зино́вьев	Old	Reelected	1883	1936	1901	Jewish	Male	

=== Candidates ===
Candidate Members of the Politburo of the 13th Congress of the All-Union Communist Party (Bolsheviks)
Name	Cyrillic	12th POL	14th POL	Birth	Death	PM	Ethnicity	Gender	Portrait
Felix Dzerzhinsky	Фе́ликс Дзержи́нский	New	Reelected	1877	1926	1906	Polish	Male	
Mikhail Frunze	Михаил Фрунзе	New	Died	1885	1925	1904	Romanian-Russian (Note: His father was Romanian and his mother Russian)	Male	
Mikhail Kalinin	Михаил Калинин	Candidate	Reelected	1875	1946	1898	Russian	Male	
Vyacheslav Molotov	Вячеслав Молотов	Candidate	Reelected	1890	1986	1906	Russian	Male	
Jānis Rudzutaks	Ян Рудзутак	Candidate	Reelected	1887	1938	1906	Latvian	Male	
Grigori Sokolnikov	Григорий Сокольников	New	Not	1888	1938	1905	Jewish	Male	
