= Orgburo of the 11th Congress of the Russian Communist Party (Bolsheviks) =

Organisational Bureau of Soviet Union (1922–23)

The 11th Orgburo of the Russian Communist Party (Bolsheviks) was elected by the 1st Plenary Session of the 11th Central Committee, in the immediate aftermath of the 11th Congress.

== Full members ==
Name (birth–death)	Took office	Left office	Duration
Andrey Andreyev (1895–1971)	3 April 1922	26 April 1923	1 year, 23 days
Felix Dzerzhinsky (1877–1926)	3 April 1922	26 April 1923	1 year, 23 days
Valerian Kuybyshev (1888–1935)	3 April 1922	26 April 1923	1 year, 23 days
Vyacheslav Molotov (1890–1986)	3 April 1922	26 April 1923	1 year, 23 days
Alexey Rykov (1881–1938)	3 April 1922	26 April 1923	1 year, 23 days
Joseph Stalin (1878–1953)	3 April 1922	26 April 1923	1 year, 23 days
Mikhail Tomsky (1880–1936)	3 April 1922	26 April 1923	1 year, 23 days

== Candidate members ==
Name (birth–death)	Took office	Left office	Duration
Mikhail Kalinin (1875–1946)	3 April 1922	26 April 1923	1 year, 23 days
Jānis Rudzutaks (1873–1959)	3 April 1922	26 April 1923	1 year, 23 days
Isaak Zelensky (1890–1938)	3 April 1922	26 April 1923	1 year, 23 days
