= Alexei Rykov =

Premier of the Soviet Union from 1924 to 1930

- Алексей Рыков
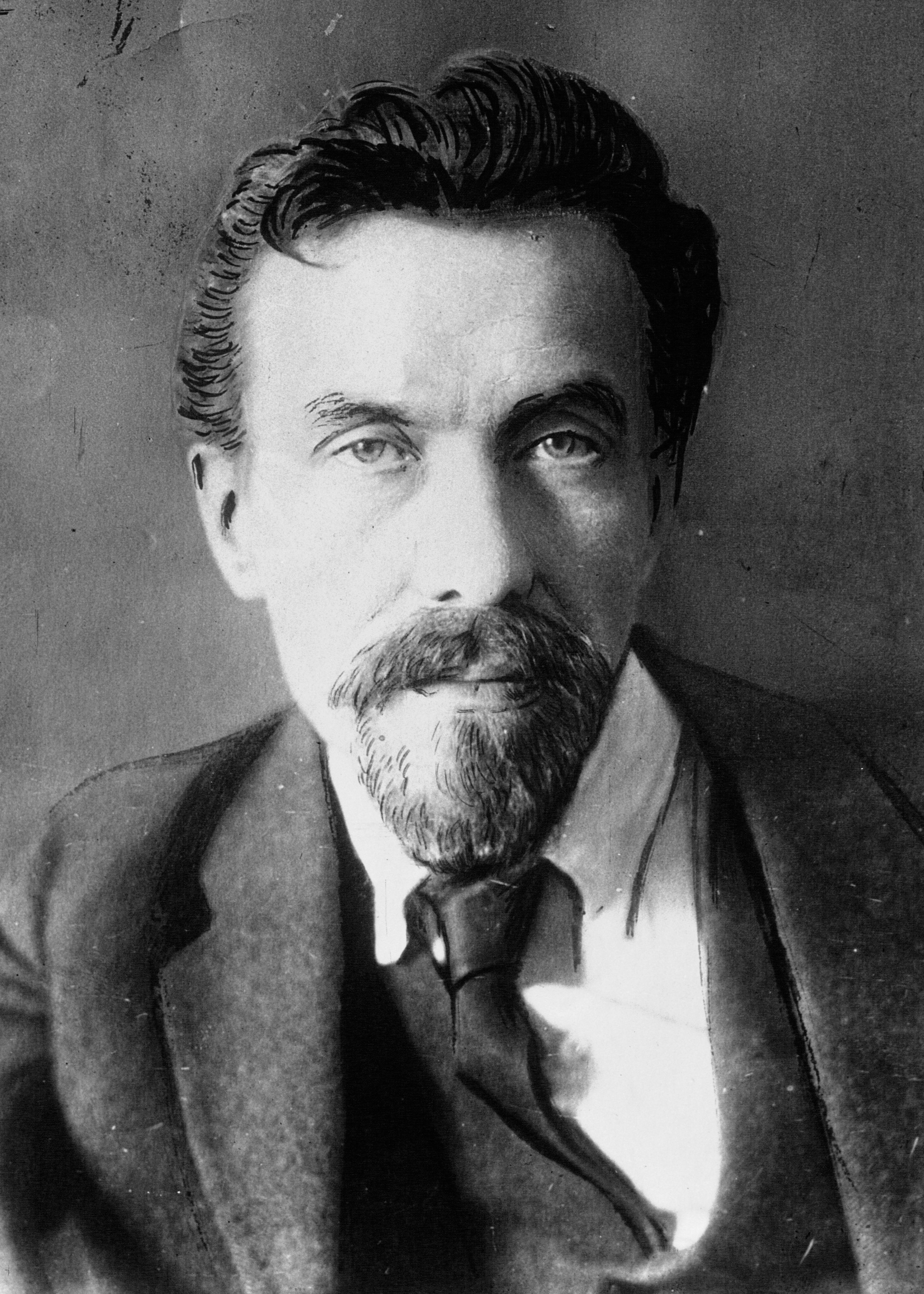
- Rykov in 1924

Premier of the Soviet Union
- In office 2 February 1924 – 19 December 1930
- Preceded by: Vladimir Lenin
- Succeeded by: Vyacheslav Molotov

Chairman of the Council of People's Commissars of the Russian SFSR
- In office 2 February 1924 – 18 May 1929
- President: Mikhail Kalinin
- Preceded by: Vladimir Lenin
- Succeeded by: Sergei Syrtsov

Chairman of the Council of Labor and Defense
- In office 19 January 1926 – 19 December 1930
- Preceded by: Lev Kamenev
- Succeeded by: Vyacheslav Molotov

People's Commissar for Posts and Telegraphs
- In office 30 March 1931 – 26 September 1936
- Premier: Vyacheslav Molotov
- Preceded by: Nikolai Antipov
- Succeeded by: Genrikh Yagoda

2nd Chairman of the Supreme Council of National Economy of the RSFSR
- In office 4 April 1918 – 26 May 1921
- Preceded by: Valerian Obolensky
- Succeeded by: Pyotr Bogdanov

1st Chairman of the Supreme Council of National Economy of the USSR
- In office 6 July 1923 – 2 February 1924
- Preceded by: Office established
- Succeeded by: Felix Dzerzhinsky

1st People's Commissar for Internal Affairs of the RSFSR
- In office 8 November 1917 – 17 November 1917
- Preceded by: Office established
- Succeeded by: Grigory Petrovsky

Full member of the 11th, 12th, 13th, 14th, 15th, 16th Politburo
- In office 3 April 1922 – 21 December 1930

Member of the 10th, 11th, 12th Orgburo
- In office 16 March 1921 – 2 June 1924

Full member of the 9th, 10th, 11th, 12th, 13th, 14th, 15th, 16th Central Committee
- In office 5 April 1920 – 10 February 1934

Candidate member of the 17th Central Committee
- In office 10 February 1934 – 12 October 1937

Personal details
- Born: Alexei Ivanovich Rykov; 25 February 1881 Saratov, Russian Empire
- Died: 15 March 1938 (aged 57) Moscow, Soviet Union
- Cause of death: Execution by firing squad
- Party: RSDLP (1898–1903); RSDLP (Bolsheviks) (1903–1918); Russian Communist Party (1918–1937)
- Children: Natalia Alekseevna Rykova (1917–2010)
- Education: University of Kazan (did not graduate)

Alexei Ivanovich Rykov (Note: Russian: Алексей Иванович Рыков) (25 February 1881 – 15 March 1938) was a Russian Bolshevik revolutionary and a Soviet politician and statesman, most prominent as premier of Russia and the Soviet Union from 1924 to 1929 and 1924 to 1930 respectively. He was one of the accused in Joseph Stalin's show trials during the Great Purge.

Rykov joined the Russian Social Democratic Labour Party in 1898. After it split into Bolshevik and Menshevik factions in 1903, he joined the Bolshevik faction led by Vladimir Lenin. Months prior to the October Revolution of 1917, he became a member of the Petrograd and Moscow Soviets and was elected to the Bolshevik Party Central Committee during the Sixth Congress of the Bolshevik Party. Rykov, a moderate, often came into political conflict with Lenin and more radical Bolsheviks but proved influential when the October Revolution finally overthrew the Russian Provisional Government. He served in many roles in the new government, starting October–November (Old Style) as People's Commissar for Internal Affairs on the first roster of the Council of People's Commissars (Sovnarkom) chaired by Lenin.

During the Russian Civil War (1918–1923), Rykov oversaw the implementation of the "War Communism" economic policy, and helped oversee the distribution of food to the Red Army and the Red Navy. After Lenin was incapacitated by his third stroke in March 1923 Rykov and Lev Kamenev were elected by the Sovnarkom to serve as deputy premiers of the Soviet Union. When Lenin died in January 1924, Rykov was chosen in February by the Council of People's Commissars as premier of both the Russian Soviet Federative Socialist Republic and of the Soviet Union. In December 1930 he was removed from the Politburo. From 1931 to 1937, Rykov served as People's Commissar of Communications on the council he formerly chaired. In February 1937 at a meeting of the Central Committee, he was arrested with Nikolai Bukharin. In March 1938, both were found guilty of treason and executed.

== Biography ==
=== Early life (1881–1900) ===
Alexei Ivanovich Rykov was born on 25 February 1881 in Saratov, Russia. His parents were ethnic Russian peasants from the village of Kukarka (located in the province Vyatka). Alexei's father, Ivan Illych Rykov, a farmer whose work had led the family to settle in Saratov died in 1889 from cholera while working in Merv. His widowed stepmother could not care for him, so he was cared for by his older sister, Klavdiya Ivanovna Rykova, an officeworker for the Ryazan-Uralsk railroad. In 1892 he began his first year of middle school in Saratov. An outstanding student, he started high school at age 13. He excelled in mathematics, physics and the natural sciences. At 15 Rykov stopped attending church and confession, and renounced his faith. He graduated from high school in 1900 and enrolled at the University of Kazan to study law, which he did not complete.

=== Pre-Revolution political activity (1898–1917) ===
Rykov joined the Russian Social Democratic Labour Party (RSDLP) in 1898 and supported its Bolshevik faction when the party split into Bolsheviks and Mensheviks at its Second Congress in 1903. He worked as a Bolshevik agent in Moscow and Saint Petersburg and played an active role in the Russian Revolution of 1905. He was elected a member of the Party's Central Committee at its 3rd Congress (boycotted by the Mensheviks) in London in 1905 and its 4th Congress in Stockholm in 1906. He was elected candidate (non-voting) member of the Central Committee at the 5th Congress in London.

Initially supportive of Bolshevik leader Vladimir Lenin in the 1908–09 struggle with Alexander Bogdanov for the leadership of the Bolshevik faction, Rykov voted to expel the latter at the June 1909 mini-conference in Paris. He spent 1910–11 exiled in France, and in 1912 expressed reproach towards Lenin's proposal that the Bolsheviks become an independent party. The dispute was interrupted by Rykov's exile to Siberia for revolutionary activity.

=== Revolution and Civil War (1917–1920) ===
Rykov returned from Siberia after the February Revolution of 1917 and re-joined the Bolsheviks, although he remained skeptical of their more radical inclinations. He became a member of the Petrograd Soviet and the Moscow Soviet. At the 6th Congress of the Bolshevik Party in July–August 1917 he was elected to the Central Committee. During the October Revolution of 1917, he was a member of the Military Revolutionary Committee in Moscow.

After the revolution, Rykov was appointed People's Commissar of Internal Affairs. On 29 October 1917 (Old Style), immediately after the Bolshevik seizure of power, the executive committee of the national railroad labor union, Vikzhel, threatened a national strike unless the Bolsheviks shared power with other socialist parties and dropped Lenin and Leon Trotsky from the government. Grigori Zinoviev, Lev Kamenev, and their allies in the Bolshevik Central Committee argued that the Bolsheviks had no choice but to start negotiations since a railroad strike would cripple their government's ability to fight the forces that were still loyal to the overthrown Provisional Government. Although Zinoviev, Kamenev, and Rykov briefly had the support of a Central Committee majority and negotiations were started, a quick collapse of the anti-Bolshevik forces outside Petrograd allowed Lenin and Trotsky to convince the Central Committee to abandon the negotiating process. In response Rykov, Zinoviev, Kamenev, Vladimir Milyutin, and Victor Nogin resigned from the Central Committee and from the government on 17 November 1917 .

On 3 April 1918 Rykov was appointed Chairman of the Supreme Council of National Economy and served in that capacity throughout the Russian Civil War. On 5 July 1919, he also became a member of the reorganized Revolutionary Military Council, where he remained until October 1919. From July 1919 and until August 1921, he was also a special representative of the Council of Labor and Defense for food supplies for the Red Army and Navy. Rykov was elected to the Communist Party Central Committee on 5 April 1920 after the 9th Party Congress and became a member of its Orgburo, where he remained until 23 May 1924.

=== Post-Civil War and rise to leadership (1920–1927) ===
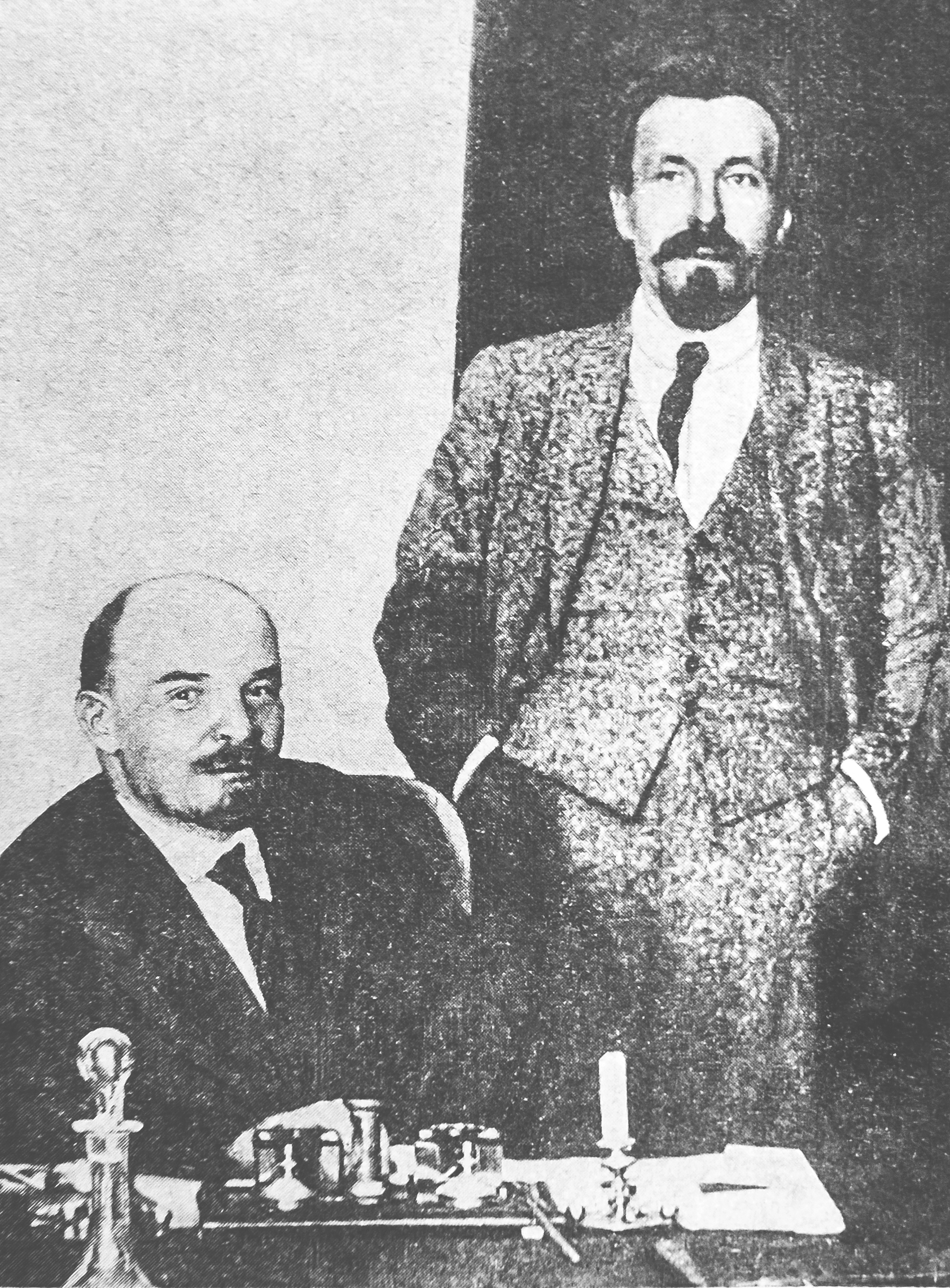
Alexei Rykov and Vladimir Lenin, 3 October 1922

Once the Bolsheviks emerged victorious in the civil war, Rykov resigned his Supreme Council of National Economy post on 28 May 1921. On 26 May 1921, he was appointed Deputy Chairman of the Council of Labor and Defense of the Russian SFSR under Lenin. With Lenin increasingly sidelined by ill health, Rykov became his deputy at the Sovnarkom (Council of People's Commissars) on 29 December. Rykov joined the ruling Politburo on 3 April 1922, after the 11th Party Congress. A government reorganization in the wake of the formation of the Soviet Union in December 1922 resulted in Rykov's appointment as Chairman of the USSR Supreme Council of National Economy and Deputy Chairman of the USSR Council of People's Commissars on 6 July 1923.

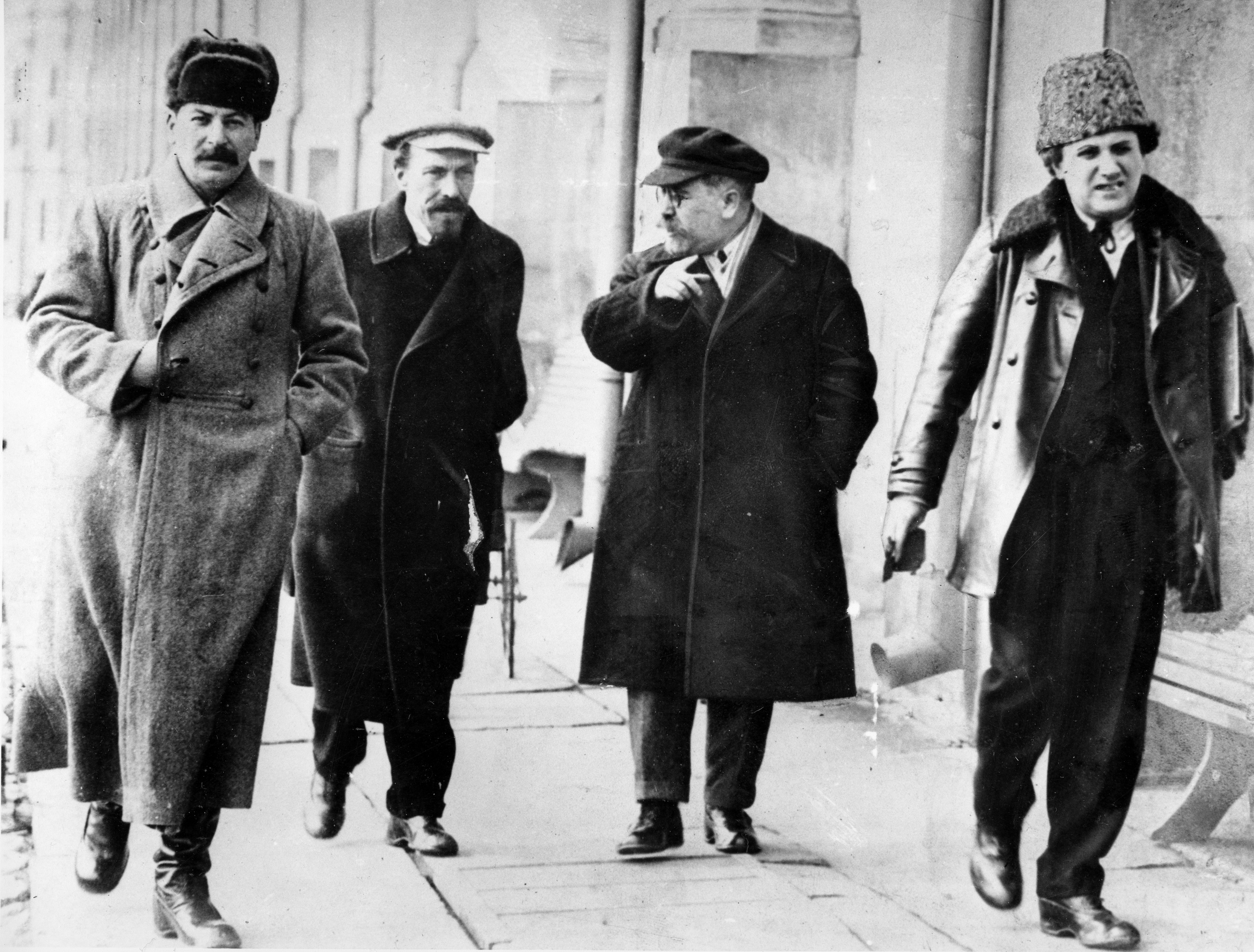
Joseph Stalin, General Secretary of the Communist Party. Alexei Rykov, Chairman of the Council of People's Commissars (Prime Minister). Lev Kamenev, Deputy Chairman of the Council of People's Commissars (Deputy Prime Minister). Grigory Zinoviev, Chairman of the Comintern's Executive Committee, April 1925

After Lenin's death on 21 January 1924 Rykov gave up his position as Chairman of the USSR Supreme Council of National Economy and became Chairman of the Council of People's Commissars of the USSR and, simultaneously, of the Sovnarkom of the RSFSR, on 2 February 1924.

According to Polish historian, Marian Kamil Dziewanowski, Rykov was placed in the position of Chairman of the Soviet Union due to support from Stalin as part of a wider effort to build an alliance in the Politburo. Dziewanowski argued that Trotsky rather than Rykov would have been the natural successor to Lenin had he accepted the position of Vice Chairman.

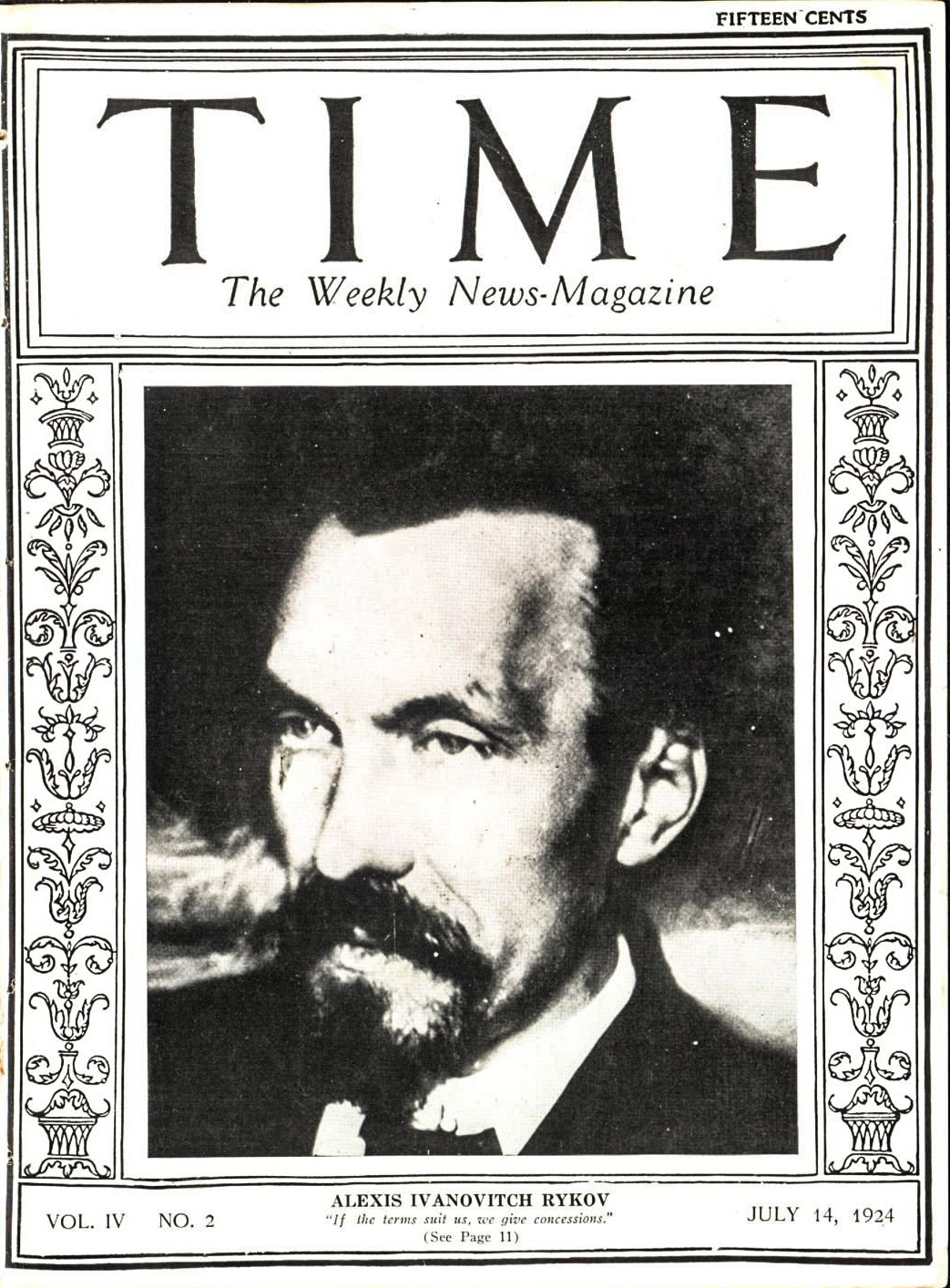
Rykov on cover of Time 14 July 1924

Along with Nikolai Bukharin and Mikhail Tomsky, Rykov led the moderate wing of the Communist Party in the 1920s, promoting a partial restoration of the market economy under NEP policies. The moderates supported Joseph Stalin, Grigory Zinoviev, and Lev Kamenev against Leon Trotsky and the Left Opposition in 1923–24. After Trotsky's defeat and Stalin's break with Zinoviev and Kamenev in 1925, Rykov, Bukharin and Tomsky supported Stalin against the United Opposition of Trotsky, Zinoviev and Kamenev in 1926–27. After Kamenev voiced opposition to Stalin at the 14th Party Congress in December 1925, he lost his position as Chairman of the Soviet Council of Labor and Defense—which he had assumed from Lenin following Lenin's death—and was replaced by Rykov on 19 January 1926.

Under his leadership vodka was heavily taxed, and became known as "Rykovka". Some of his political opponents claimed that he was a heavy drinker, but in reality he was an abstainer.

=== Rise of Stalin and demise (1927–1938) ===
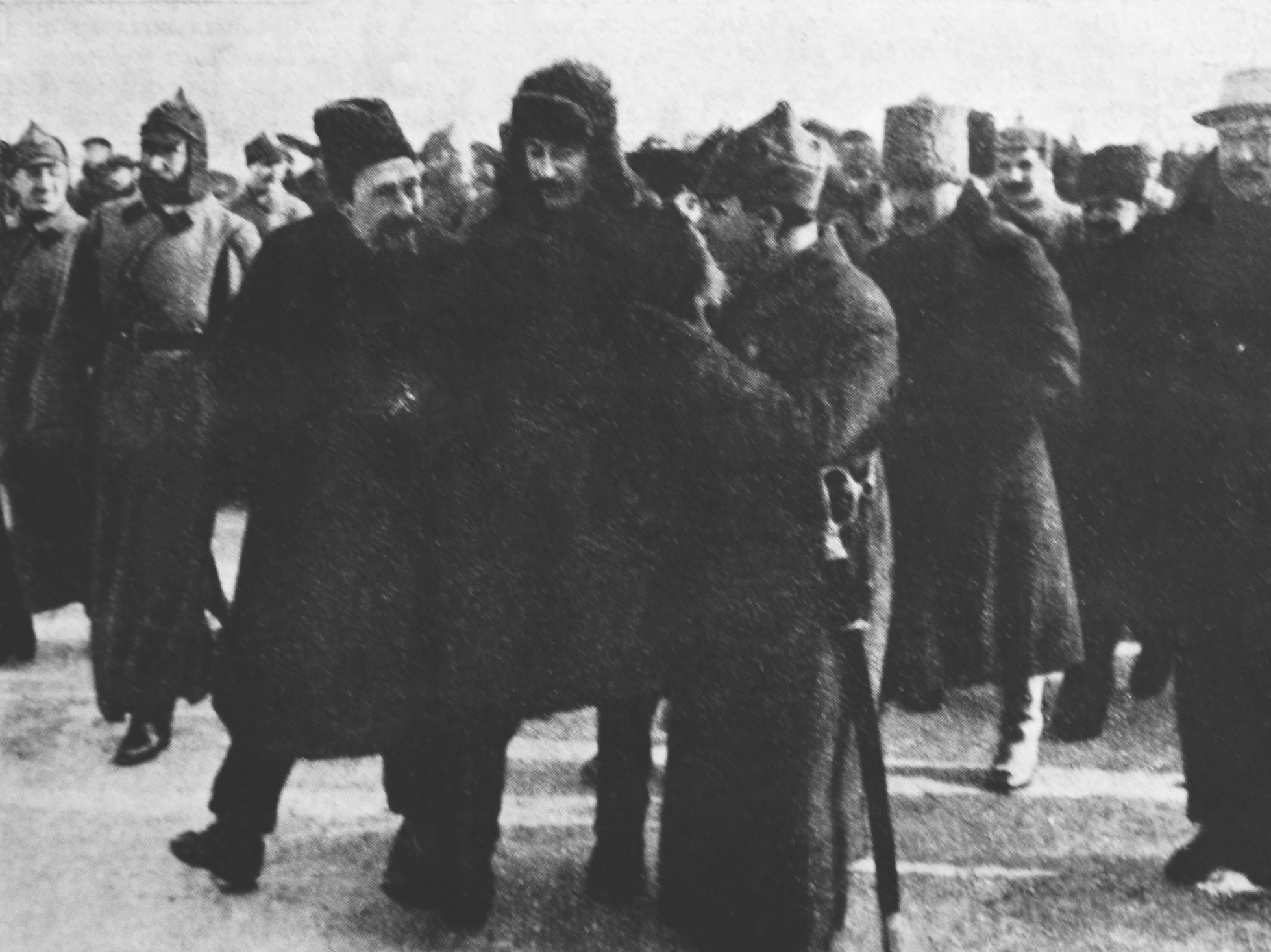
Alexei Rykov, Joseph Stalin and Klim Voroshilov, February 1928

Rykov's Premiership encompassed drastic change in the power structure of the Soviet Union. From 1924 to 1930 the role of the Communist Party—informally led by Stalin who, as General Secretary, controlled Party membership—increasingly usurped powers from the legitimate governmental structures. Although an exact date cannot be given for Stalin's rise to power, the United Opposition—which consisted of Kamenev, Zinoviev, and Trotsky—was defeated and its followers were expelled from the Party by December 1927. After the defeat of the United Opposition, Stalin adopted more radical policies and came into conflict with the moderate wing of the party. The two factions maneuvered behind the scenes throughout 1928. In February–April 1929 the conflict came to a head and the moderates, branded the Right Opposition, or "Rightists", were defeated and forced to "admit their mistakes" in November 1929. Rykov lost his position as Premier of the Russian SFSR to Sergei Syrtsov on 18 May 1929, but retained his other two posts. On 19 December 1930, after admitting another round of "mistakes", he was replaced by Vyacheslav Molotov as both Soviet Premier and Chairman of the Council of Labor and Defense. Two days later, Rykov was expelled from the Politburo, taking with him any chance of political advancement.

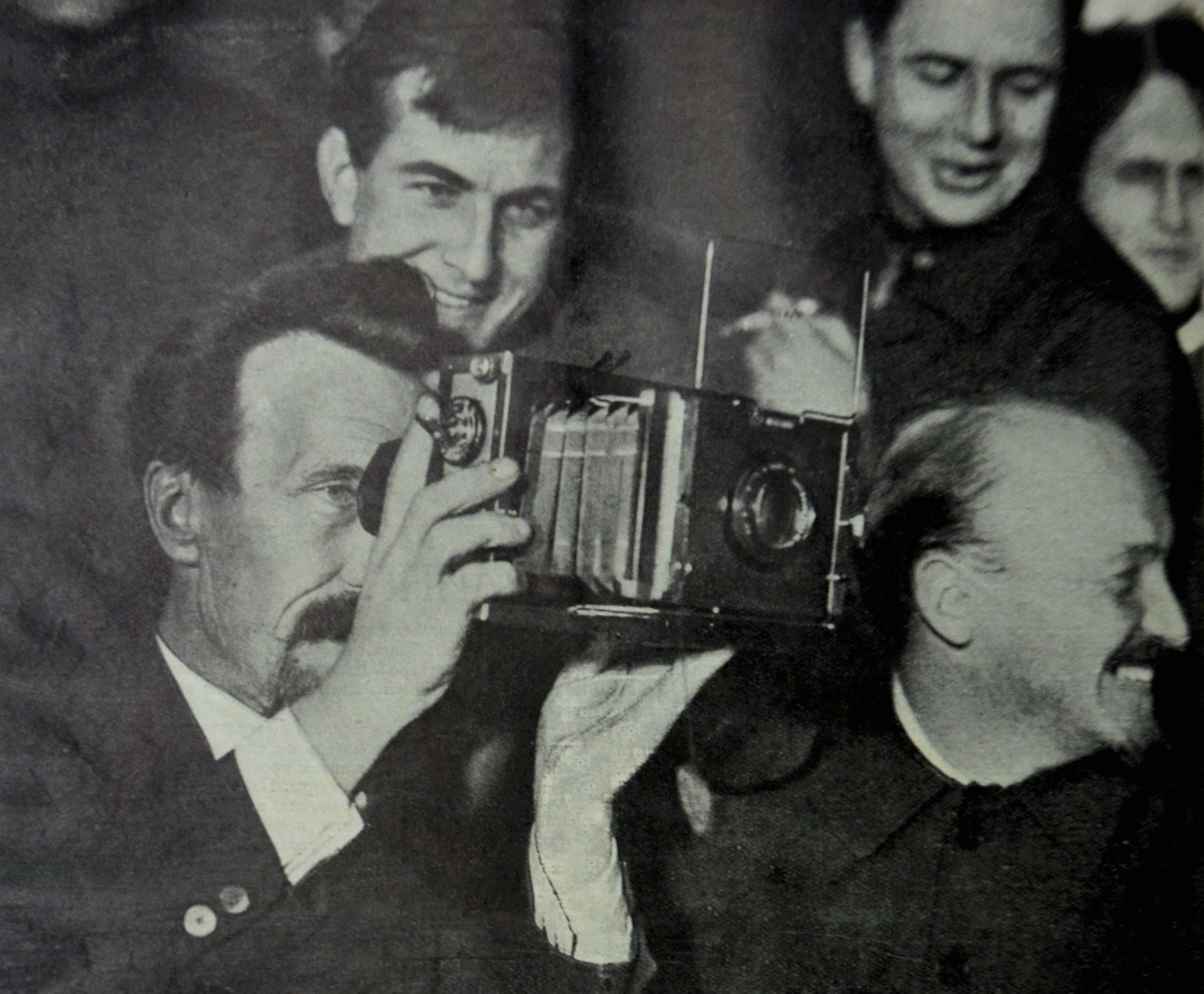
Photo Reporter Samsonov shows his camera to Alexei Rykov and Nikolai Bukharin, 1928

On 30 March 1931, Rykov was appointed People's Commissar of Posts and Telegraphs, a position that he continued to occupy after the Commissariat was reorganized as People's Commissariat for Communications of the USSR in January 1932. On 10 February 1934, he was demoted to a candidate (non-voting) member of the Party's Central Committee. On 26 September 1936, in the wake of accusations made at the first Moscow Show Trial against Kamenev and Zinoviev, and Tomsky's suicide, Rykov lost his position as People's Commissar of Communications, but retained his membership in the Central Committee.

=== Trial and death ===
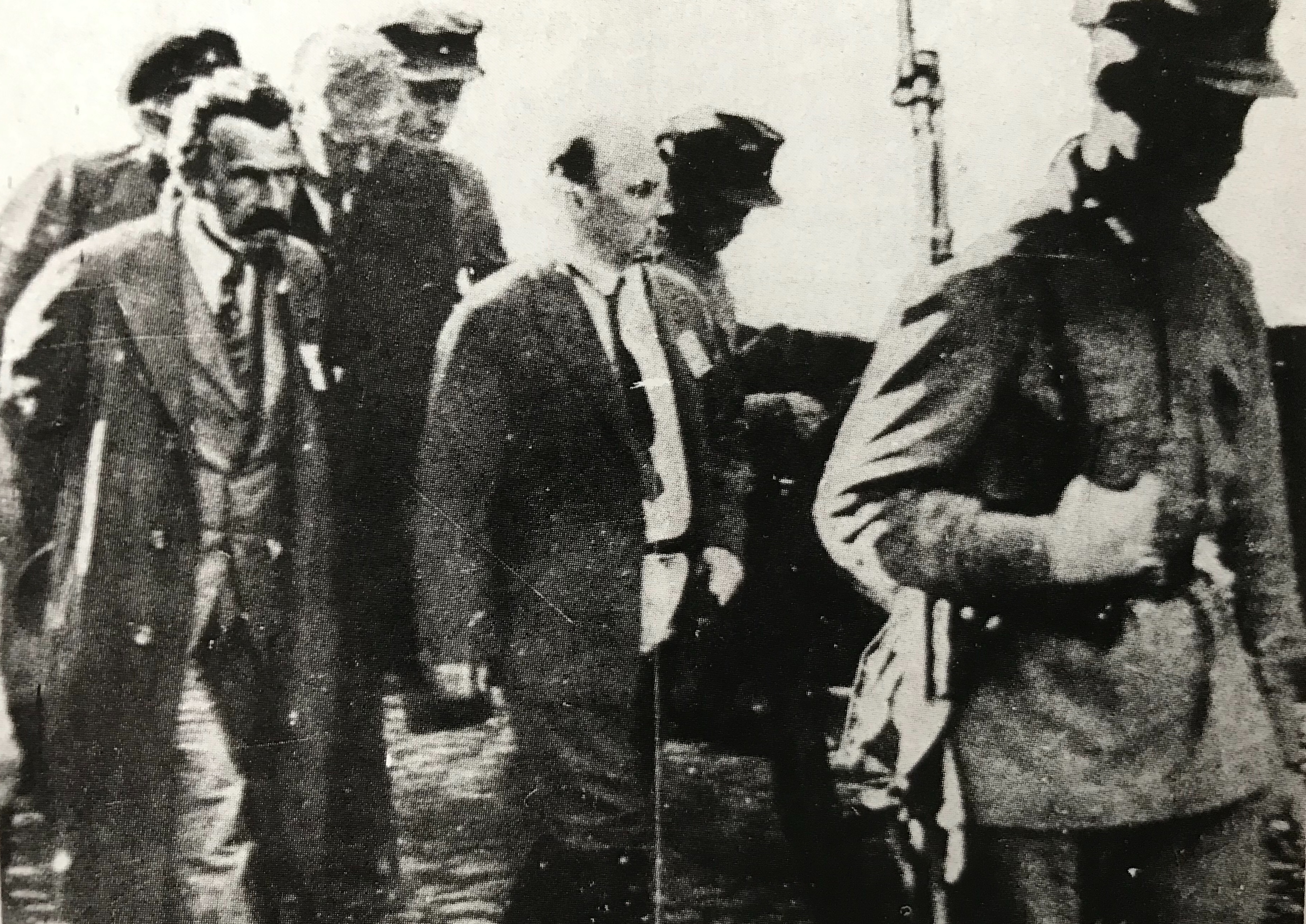
Bukharin and Rykov, shortly before the trial in 1938.

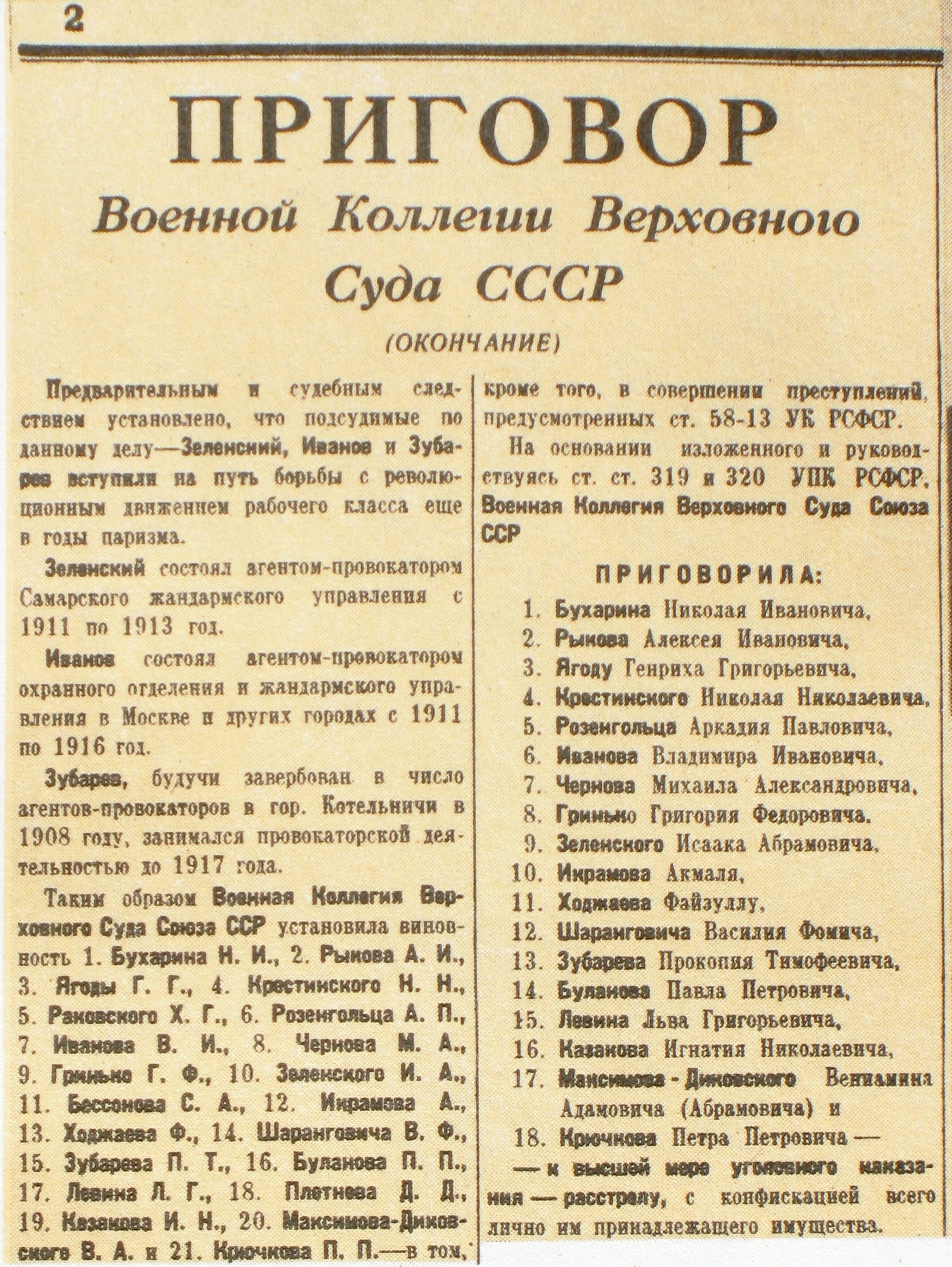
The verdict at the Trial of the Twenty-One.

Expecting the worst, Rykov nearly decided to follow the example of his close friend Mikhail Tomsky and preempt arrest by committing suicide, but was convinced otherwise by his family. As Stalin's Great Purge intensified in early 1937, Rykov and Bukharin were expelled from the Communist Party and arrested at the February–March 1937 meeting of the Central Committee on 27 February. On 13 March 1938, at the Trial of the Twenty-One, Rykov, Bukharin, Nikolay Krestinsky, Christian Rakovsky, Genrikh Yagoda, and sixteen other Soviet officials were found guilty of treason (having plotted with Trotsky against Stalin) and sentenced to death by the Military Collegium. Rykov wrote a letter to the collegium requesting clemency but failed to get them to overturn the verdict. Rykov was executed by firing squad on March 14, 1938, after being found guilty of treason and other charges.

=== Family ===
Rykov's wife, Nina Semyonova, née Marshak, was arrested in 1937. Yevgenia Ginzburg, who was also arrested in 1937, recorded being approached inside Butyrka prison by "a woman of about 55, with an expression of acute suffering on her face" who demanded: "Have they tried them yet? They've shot them, haven't they?" Ginzburg was told this was Rykov's wife, vainly seeking news of her husband. Nina Rykov was shot on 22 August 1938.

Their daughter Natalya, born 1916, worked for the NKVD as a teacher until her father's arrest, when she was sent into administrative exile in Tomsk, where she was arrested on 1 March 1938 and sentenced to eight years in the gulag for 'anti-soviet agitation'. On completing her sentence in 1946, she was sentenced to five years exile in East Kazakhstan, but before that had expired, she was arrested again and exiled to the Yenisey region of Krasnoyarsk. In exile, she underwent two operations for cancer, could not work, and had to depend on her husband, Walter Perli (1907–1961), a former officer in the Estonian army, arrested during the Soviet occupation of Estonia in 1940, whom she married in exile in June 1949. Perli, who worked as an accountant, also financially supported Nina Rykova's elderly sister, Yelena Tolmacheva, until he was admitted to hospital with tuberculosis. She was released in September 1954, after 16 years prison and exile.

=== Rehabilitation and legacy ===
The Soviet government annulled the verdict in 1988 and posthumously rehabilitated him during the perestroika. Rykov was then reinstated in the Communist Party of the Soviet Union.

Christian Science Monitor reporter William Henry Chamberlin met Rykov several times during the late 1920s and early 1930s, including on a trip of inspection to the famine zone of the Lower Volga region in the aftermath of the Great Famine of 1932–33. Chamberlin remembered Rykov as "perhaps the most humanly attractive figure in the Soviet leadership" and a lost opportunity for Russia:

"His manner was simple, kindly, unaffected, what one might expect from a Russian provincial teacher or doctor. And I was rather struck by the expression of brooding sadness on his face; it was a reasonable guess that he felt more keenly than most men in the seats of power the contrast between the old revolutionary ideals and the hard realities of the present. It was one of the missed chances of Soviet history that Rykov and his considerable following in the Communist Party, those who believed in a milder approach to the peasants, could not have found support in the top leadership of the Red Army for a coup that would have eliminated Stalin during the grim years, 1929–33, when there was enough popular discontent with the sharply deteriorating situation with food and manufactured goods to have made such a move psychologically feasible."

== See also ==
- Outline of the Russian Revolution and Civil War
- Bibliography of the Russian Revolution and Civil War
- Bibliography of Stalinism and the Soviet Union
- Index of Old Bolsheviks
- Index of articles related to the Russian Revolution and Civil War

== Citations ==
Political offices
Preceded by Vladimir Lenin	Chairman of the Council of People's Commissars of the USSR; 1924–30	Succeeded by Vyacheslav Molotov
Preceded by Vladimir Lenin	Chairman of the Council of People's Commissars of the RSFSR; 1924–29	Succeeded by Sergei Syrtsov
Awards and achievements
Preceded by James Stillman Rockefeller	Cover of Time magazine 14 July 1924	Succeeded by Gaston Doumergue
