= Orgburo of the 12th Congress of the Russian Communist Party (Bolsheviks) =

Organisational Bureau of Soviet Union (1923–24)

The 12th Orgburo of the Russian Communist Party (Bolsheviks) was elected by the 1st plenary session of the 12th Central Committee, in the immediate aftermath of the 12th Congress.

== Full members ==
Name (birth–death)	Took office	Left office	Duration	Note
Andrey Andreyev (1895–1971)	26 April 1923	2 June 1924	1 year, 37 days	—
Felix Dzerzhinsky (1877–1926)	26 April 1923	2 June 1924	1 year, 37 days	—
Valerian Kuybyshev (1888–1935)	26 April 1923	2 June 1924	1 year, 37 days	—
Vyacheslav Molotov (1890–1986)	26 April 1923	2 June 1924	1 year, 37 days	—
Jānis Rudzutaks (1873–1959)	26 April 1923	2 June 1924	1 year, 37 days	—
Alexey Rykov (1881–1938)	26 April 1923	2 June 1924	1 year, 37 days	—
Joseph Stalin (1878–1953)	26 April 1923	2 June 1924	1 year, 37 days	—
Mikhail Tomsky (1880–1936)	26 April 1923	2 June 1924	1 year, 37 days	—
Grigory Zinoviev (1883–1936)	25 September 1923	2 June 1924	251 days	Elected at the 4th plenary session.
Leon Trotsky (1879–1940)	25 September 1923	2 June 1924	251 days	Elected at the 4th plenary session.

== Candidate members ==
Name (birth–death)	Took office	Left office	Duration	Note
Mikhail Kalinin (1875–1946)	26 April 1923	2 June 1924	1 year, 37 days	—
Vasily Mikhailov (1894–1937)	26 April 1923	2 June 1924	1 year, 37 days	—
Isaak Zelensky (1890–1938)	26 April 1923	2 June 1924	1 year, 37 days	—
Nikolai Bukharin (1888–1938)	25 September 1923	2 June 1924	251 days	Elected at the 4th plenary session.
Ivan Korotkov (1885–1949)	25 September 1923	2 June 1924	251 days	Elected at the 4th plenary session.
