= Lev Kamenev =

Russian revolutionary and Soviet politician (1883–1936)

- Лев Каменев
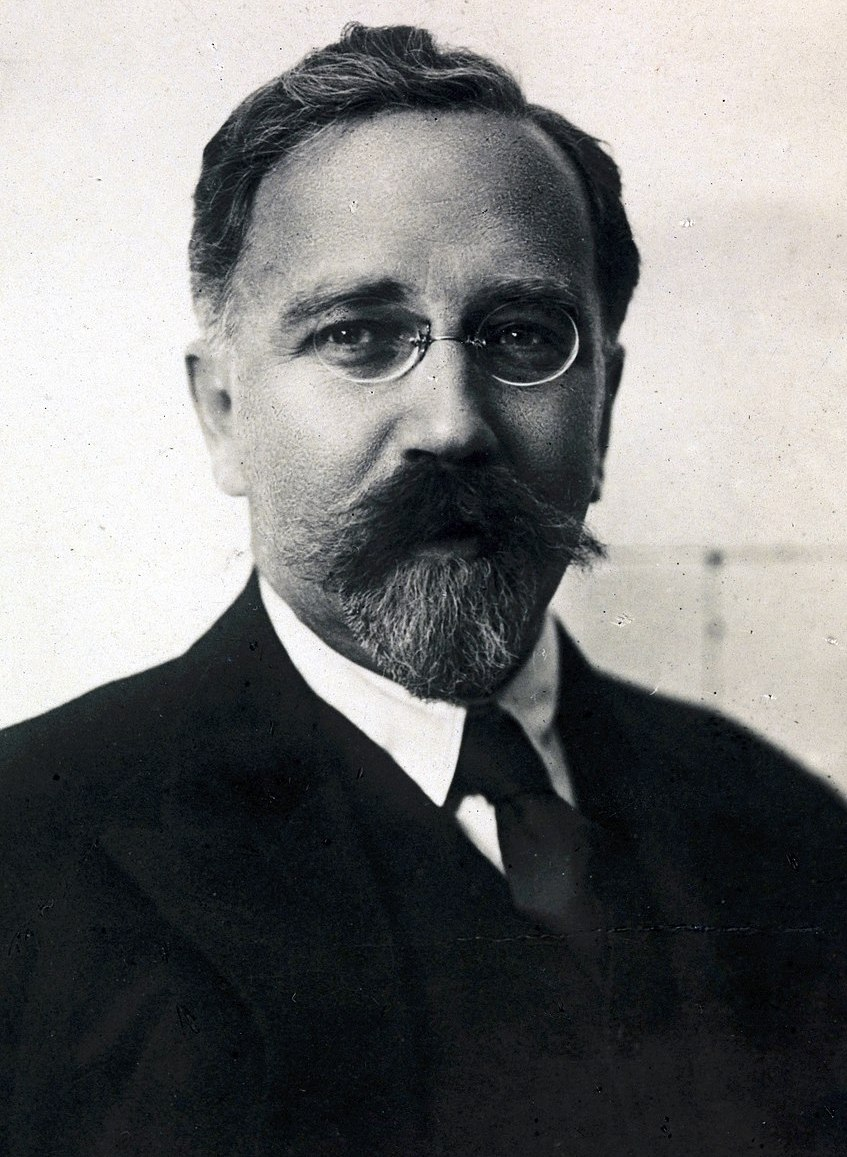
- Kamenev, c. 1920s

Chairman of the All-Russian Central Executive Committee
- In office 9 November 1917 – 21 November 1917
- Premier: Vladimir Lenin
- Preceded by: Alexander Kerensky (Note: As head of state as Chairman of the Russian Provisional Government)
- Succeeded by: Yakov Sverdlov

Deputy Premier of the Soviet Union
- In office 6 July 1923 – 16 January 1926
- Premiers: Vladimir Lenin; Alexey Rykov

Chairman of the Moscow Council of Workers' Deputies
- In office October 1918 – 17 May 1926
- Preceded by: Pyotr Smidovich
- Succeeded by: Konstantin Ukhanov

Director of the Lenin Institute
- In office 31 March 1923 – 1926
- Preceded by: Post established
- Succeeded by: Ivan Skvortsov-Stepanov

Personal details
- Born: Lev Borisovich Rozenfeld; 18 July 1883 Moscow, Russian Empire
- Died: 25 August 1936 (aged 53) Moscow, Soviet Union
- Cause of death: Execution by firing squad
- Party: RSDLP (1901–1903); RSDLP (Bolsheviks) (1903–1918); Russian Communist Party (Bolsheviks) (1918–1927, 1928–1932, 1933–1934)
- Spouse(s): Olga Kameneva (m. 1902; div. 1928) Tatiana Glebova (m. 1928)
- Domestic partner: Clare Sheridan (1920)
- Children: 3
- Education: Moscow State University
- Central institution membership: 1912–1927: Full member of the 6th, 7th, 8th, 9th, 10th, 11th, 12th, 13th and 14th Central Committee of the Communist Party of the Soviet Union; 1917: Full member of the Politburo of the Russian Social Democratic Labour Party (Bolsheviks); 1919–1926: Full member of the 8th, 9th, 10th, 11th 12th, and 13th Politburo of the Communist Party of the Soviet Union; 1926: Candidate member of the 14th Politburo

Lev Borisovich Kamenev (Note: Russian: Лев Борисович Каменев, IPA: [ˈlʲev bɐˈrʲisəvʲɪtɕ ˈkamʲɪnʲɪf]) (né Rozenfeld; (Note: Russian: Розенфельд) 18 July [O.S. 6 July] 1883 – 25 August 1936) was a Russian revolutionary and Soviet politician. A prominent Old Bolshevik, Kamenev was a leading figure in the early Soviet government and served as a deputy premier of the Soviet Union from 1923 to 1926.

Born in Moscow to a family active in revolutionary politics, Lev Kamenev joined the Russian Social Democratic Labour Party in 1901 and sided with Vladimir Lenin's Bolshevik faction after the party's 1903 split. He was arrested several times and participated in the failed Revolution of 1905, after which he moved abroad and became one of Lenin's close associates. In 1914, Kamenev was arrested upon returning to Saint Petersburg and exiled to Siberia. He returned after the February Revolution of 1917, which overthrew the monarchy, and joined Grigory Zinoviev in opposing Lenin's "April Theses" and an armed seizure of power within the former Russian Empire. Nevertheless, when Lenin came to power in Russia following the success of the October Revolution, Kamenev briefly served as chairman of the All-Russian Congress of Soviets along with a number of senior posts, including chairman of the Moscow Soviet and Deputy Chairman of the Council of People's Commissars. In 1919, he was elected as a full member of the first Central Committee Politburo, the supreme decision-making body of the emerging Communist Party of the Soviet Union.

When Vladimir Lenin suffered a stroke in May 1922, Lev Kamenev formed a triumvirate alongside Zinoviev and the ruling party's General Secretary, Joseph Stalin, that led Soviet Russia until Lenin returned to work later in the year. After Lenin sustained a second stroke in December 1922, Kamenev became the country's acting Premier and chairman of the Politburo for the rest of the Soviet leader's lifetime. Just as a third stroke in March 1923 definitively ruled out any prospect of Lenin returning to government, the aforementioned triumvirate proceeded to consolidate power within the regime by marginalizing Leon Trotsky and his allies.

After being decisively eclipsed by Stalin within the Soviet leadership by 1925, Kamenev was stripped of his offices in 1926 before being expelled from the party altogether in 1927. While readmitted to the party's membership, he never again occupied a position of power in the Soviet Union. In 1934, Kamenev was arrested in response to allegations of complicity in Sergei Kirov's assassination and sentenced to ten years in prison. He was ultimately made a chief defendant in the Trial of the Sixteen (the show trial at the beginning of Stalin's Great Purge), found guilty of treason, and executed in August 1936.

== Early life and career ==
Kamenev was born Lev Borisovich Rozenfeld in Moscow to a Jewish father and a Russian Orthodox mother. Both his parents were active in radical politics. His father, an engine driver on the Moscow-Kursk railway, had been a fellow student of Ignacy Hryniewiecki, the revolutionary who killed the Tsar Alexander II. When Kamenev was a child, his family moved to Vilno, and then in 1896, to Tiflis (known as Tbilisi after 1936), where he first made contact with an illegal Marxist circle. His father used the capital he earned in the construction of the Baku–Batumi railway to pay for Lev's education. Kamenev attended the boys' Gymnasium in Tiflis. In 1900, he enrolled as law student in Imperial Moscow University. He joined the Russian Social Democratic Labour Party (RSDLP) in 1901, and was arrested in March 1902 for taking part in a student protest, and, after a few months in prison, was sent back to Tiflis under police escort. Later in 1902, he moved to Paris, where he met Vladimir Lenin, whose adherent and close associate he became, other Marxist exiles from the Iskra group that published the newspaper, and his wife, Olga Bronstein, younger sister of Leon Trotsky. The couple had two sons together.

From that point on, Kamenev worked as a professional revolutionary and was active in the capitals of St. Petersburg, Moscow and Tiflis. In January 1904, he was forced to leave Tiflis, where he had helped organise a strike on the Transcaucasian railway, and moved to Moscow, where he learnt about the split between the Bolshevik and Menshevik factions, and joined the Bolsheviks. Arrested in February 1904, he was held in prison for five months, then deported back to Tiflis, where he joined the local Bolshevik committee, working alongside Georgian Bolsheviks, including Joseph Stalin. After attending the 3rd Congress of the RSDLP in London in March 1905, he returned to Russia to participate in the Russian Revolution of 1905 in St. Petersburg in October–December.

He went back to London to attend the 5th RSDLP Party Congress, where he was elected to the party's Central Committee and the Bolshevik Center, in May 1907, but was arrested upon his return to Russia. After Kamenev was released from prison in 1908, he and his family went abroad later in the year to help Lenin edit the Bolshevik magazine Proletariy. After Lenin's split with another senior Bolshevik leader, Alexander Bogdanov, in mid-1908, Kamenev and Grigory Zinoviev became Lenin's main assistants abroad. They helped him expel Bogdanov and his Otzovist (Recallist) followers from the Bolshevik faction of the RSDLP in mid-1909.

In January 1910, Leninists, followers of Bogdanov, and various Menshevik factions held a meeting of the party's Central Committee in Paris and tried to reunite the party. Kamenev and Zinoviev were dubious about the idea but were willing to give it a try under pressure from "conciliator" Bolsheviks like Victor Nogin. Lenin was adamantly opposed to re-unification, but was outvoted within the Bolshevik leadership. The meeting reached a tentative agreement. As one of its provisions, Trotsky's Vienna-based Pravda was designated as a party-financed 'central organ'. In this process, Kamenev, Trotsky's brother-in-law, was added to Pravda's editorial board as a representative of the Bolsheviks. The unification attempts failed in August 1910, when Kamenev resigned from the board amid mutual recriminations.

After the failure of the reunification attempt, Kamenev continued working for Proletariy and taught at the Bolshevik party school at Longjumeau near Paris. It had been founded as a Leninist alternative to Bogdanov's Party School based in Capri. In January 1912, Kamenev helped Lenin and Zinoviev to convince the Prague Conference of Bolshevik delegates to split from the Mensheviks and Otzovists.

In January 1914, he was sent to St. Petersburg to direct the work of the Bolshevik version of Pravda and the Bolshevik faction of the Duma. He moved to Finland when Pravda was closed, in July 1914, and was there when World War I broke out. He organised a conference in Finland Bolshevik delegates to the Duma and others, but all the participants were arrested in November tried in May 1915. In court, he distanced himself from Lenin's anti-war stance. In early 1915, Kamenev was sentenced to exile in Siberia; he survived two years there until being freed by the successful February Revolution of 1917.

Before leaving Siberia, Kamenev proposed sending a telegram thanking the Tsar's brother Mikhail for refusing the throne. He was so embarrassed later by his action that he denied ever having sent it.

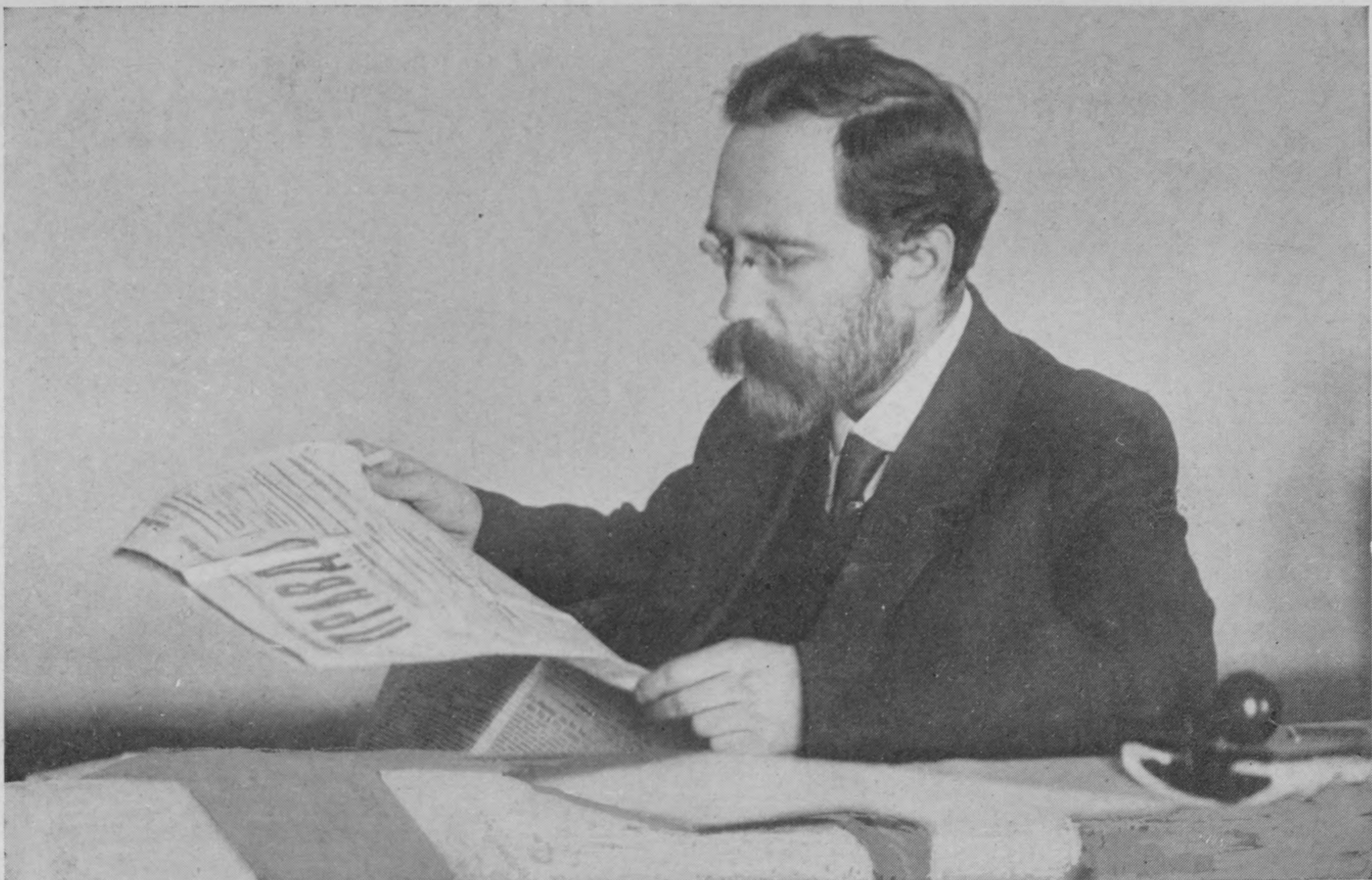
Lev Kamenev reads Pravda (1921).

On 25 March 1917, Kamenev returned from Siberian exile to St. Petersburg (renamed as Petrograd in 1914). Kamenev and Central Committee members Joseph Stalin and Matvei Muranov took control of the revived Bolshevik Pravda and moved it to the Right. Kamenev formulated a policy of conditional support of the newly formed Russian Provisional Government and a reconciliation with the Mensheviks. After Lenin's return to Russia on 3 April 1917, Kamenev briefly resisted Lenin's anti-government April Theses but soon fell in line and supported Lenin until September. Kamenev and Zinoviev had a falling out with Lenin over their opposition to the Soviet seizure of power in October 1917. On 10 October 1917 (Old Style), Kamenev and Zinoviev were the only two Central Committee members to vote against an armed revolt. Their publication of an open letter opposed to using force enraged Lenin, who demanded their expulsion from the party. However, when the Bolshevik-led Military Revolutionary Committee, headed by Adolph Joffe, and the Petrograd Soviet, led by Trotsky, staged an uprising, Kamenev and Zinoviev went along. At the Second All-Russian Congress of Soviets, Kamenev was elected Congress Chairman and chairman of the permanent All-Russian Central Executive Committee. The latter position was equivalent to the head of state under the Soviet system.

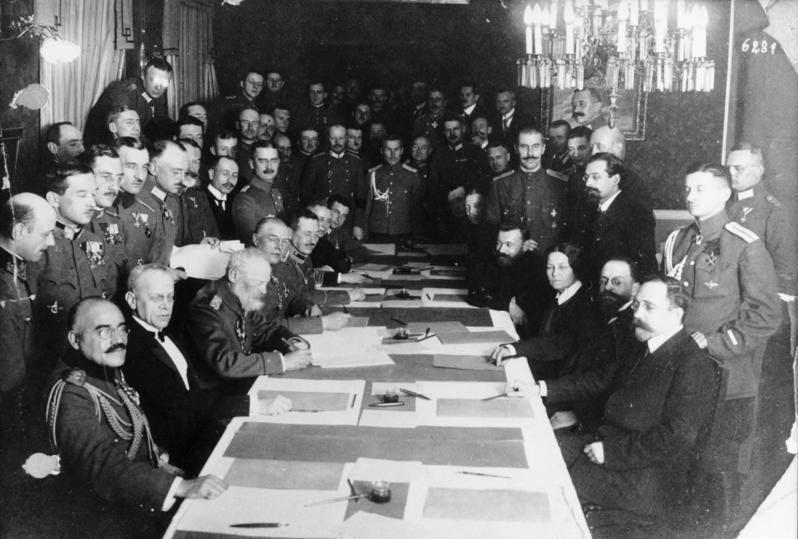
Kamenev at the Brest-Litovsk in December 1917 (right first).

On 10 November 1917, three days after the Soviet seizure of power during the October Revolution, the executive committee of the national railroad labor union, Vikzhel, threatened a nationwide strike unless the Bolsheviks shared power with other socialist parties and dropped the uprising's leaders, Lenin and Trotsky, from the government. Zinoviev, Kamenev and their allies in the Bolshevik Central Committee argued that the Bolsheviks had no choice but to start negotiations, since a railroad strike would cripple their government's ability to fight the forces that were still loyal to the overthrown Provisional Government. Although Zinoviev and Kamenev briefly had the support of a Central Committee majority and negotiations were started, a quick collapse of the anti-Bolshevik forces outside Petrograd aided Lenin and Trotsky to convince the Central Committee to abandon the negotiating process. In response, Zinoviev, Kamenev, Alexei Rykov, Vladimir Milyutin and Victor Nogin resigned from the Central Committee on 4 November 1917 (Old Style) and Kamenev resigned from his Central Executive Committee post. The following day, Lenin wrote a proclamation calling Zinoviev and Kamenev "deserters." He never forgot their behavior, eventually making an ambiguous reference to their "October episode" in his Testament.

In late 1917, Kamenev was sent to negotiate with Germany over the potential armistice at Brest-Litovsk, which finally came in the form of Treaty of Brest-Litovsk. In January 1918, Kamenev was sent to spread the revolution to Britain and France and negotiate with the countries about the potential alliance in case Germany continued its offensive against the Bolshevik regime, but after he had been in London for a week, he was arrested and deported. On his return, via Finland, he was captured by Finnish partisans led by Hjalmar von Bonsdorff opposed to the Bolshevik revolution, and held until August 1918, when he was exchanged for Finnish prisoners held by the Bolsheviks.

== Opposition to Trotsky ==
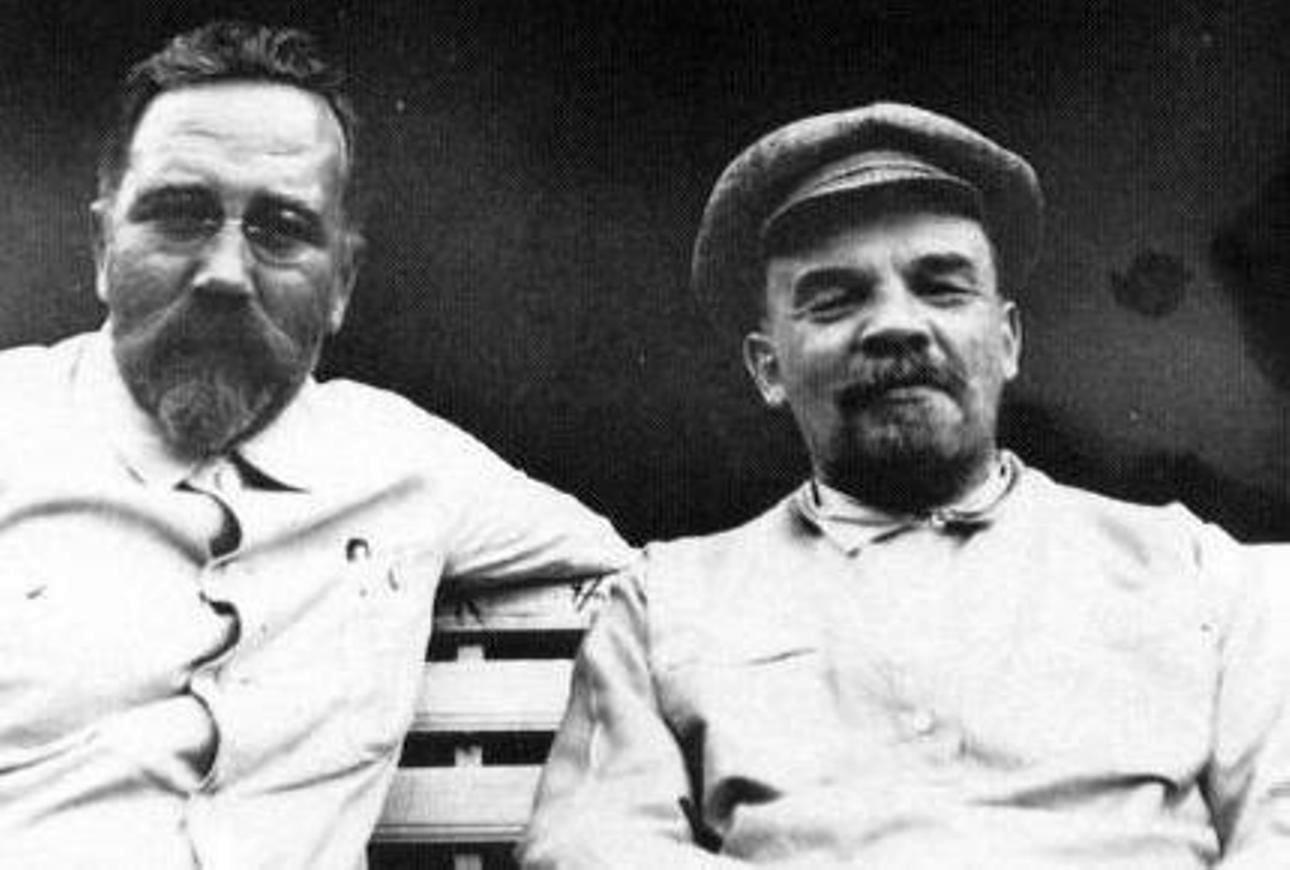
Kamenev and Lenin at Gorki, 1922

In 1918, Kamenev became chairman of the Moscow Soviet, and soon after that, Lenin's Deputy Chairman of the Council of People's Commissars (government) and the Council of Labour and Defence. In March 1919, Kamenev was elected a full member of the first Politburo. His relationship with his brother-in-law Trotsky, which was good in the aftermath of the 1917 revolution and during the Russian Civil War, lessened after 1920. For the next 15 years, Kamenev was a friend and close ally of Grigory Zinoviev.

During Lenin's illness, Kamenev was appointed as the acting President of the Council of People's Commissars and Politburo chairman. Together with Zinoviev and Joseph Stalin, he formed a ruling Triumvirate (also known by its Russian name Troika) in the Communist Party, and played a key role in the marginalization of Trotsky. The triumvirate carefully managed the intra-party debate and delegate selection process in the fall of 1923 during the run-up to the 13th Party Conference, securing a vast majority of the seats. The Conference, held in January 1924, immediately prior to Lenin's death, denounced Trotsky and "Trotskyism."

In the spring of 1924, while the triumvirate was criticizing the policies of Trotsky and the Left Opposition as "anti-Leninist", the tensions between the volatile Zinoviev and his close ally Kamenev on one hand, and the cautious Stalin on the other, became more pronounced and threatened to end their fragile alliance. However, Zinoviev and Kamenev helped Stalin retain his position as General Secretary of the Central Committee at the XIIIth Party Congress in May–June 1924 during the first Lenin's Testament controversy, ensuring that the triumvirate gained more political advantage at Trotsky's expense.

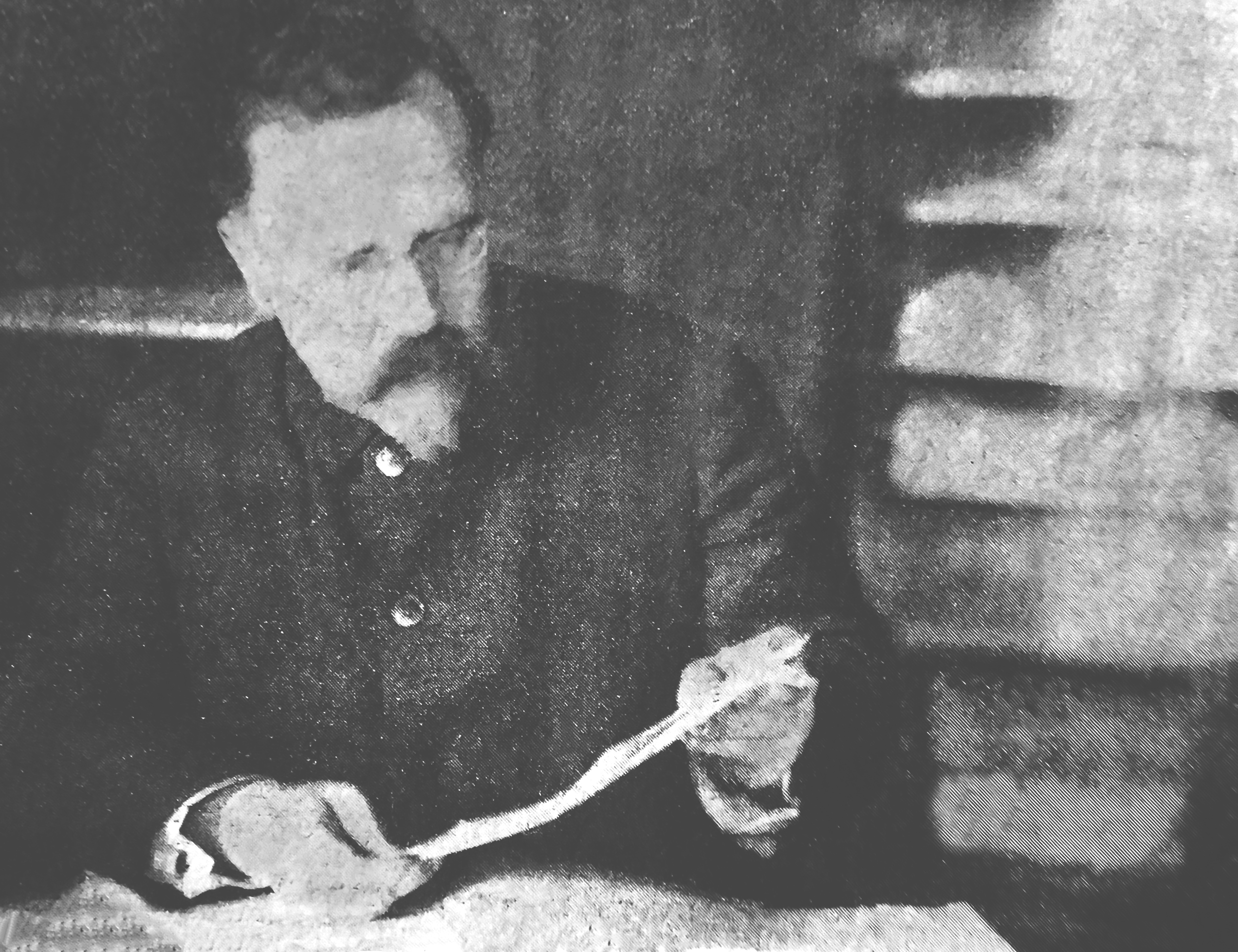
Lev Kamenev, Director of the Lenin Institute of the Central Committee 1923

In October 1924, Stalin proposed his new theory of Socialism in One Country in opposition to Trotsky's theory of Permanent revolution, while Trotsky published "Lessons of October," an extensive summary of the events of 1917. In the article, Trotsky described Zinoviev and Kamenev's opposition to the Bolshevik seizure of power in 1917, which the two would have preferred to be left unmentioned. This started a new round of intra-party struggle, with Zinoviev and Kamenev again allied with Stalin against Trotsky. They and their supporters accused Trotsky of various mistakes and worse during the Russian Civil War. Trotsky was ill and unable to respond much to the criticism, and the triumvirate damaged Trotsky's military reputation so much that he was forced out of his ministerial post as People's Commissar of Army and Fleet Affairs and Chairman of the Revolutionary Military Council in January 1925. Zinoviev demanded Trotsky's expulsion from the Communist Party, but Stalin refused to go along with this and skillfully played the role of a moderate.

At the 14th Conference of the Communist Party in April 1925, Zinoviev and Kamenev found themselves in a minority when their motion to specify that socialism could only be achieved internationally was rejected, resulting in the triumvirate of recent years breaking up. At this time, Stalin was moving more and more into a political alliance with Nikolai Bukharin and the Right Opposition, with Bukharin having elaborated on Stalin's Socialism in One Country policy, giving it a theoretical justification. One of Kamenev's last public acts while he was still a major figure in the soviet leadership was to read the story The Heart of a Dog, by Mikhail Bulgakov. He denounced it, saying "It's an acerbic broadside about the present age, and there can be absolutely no question of publishing it." The story was banned in the Soviet Union until 1987.

According to Polish historian, Marian Kamil Dziewanowski, Kamenev was denied the position of Chairman of the Council of People's Commissars of the Soviet Union on Stalin's suggestion due to his Jewish origins. Stalin favoured Alexei Rykov and placed him in the position due to his Russian, peasant background. Conversely, Russian historian Roy Medvedev stated that Trotsky "undoubtedly would have been first among Lenin's deputies" given his authority in 1922 and noted that Kamenev lacked any personal desire to become Chairman upon Lenin's death.

== Break with Stalin (1925) ==
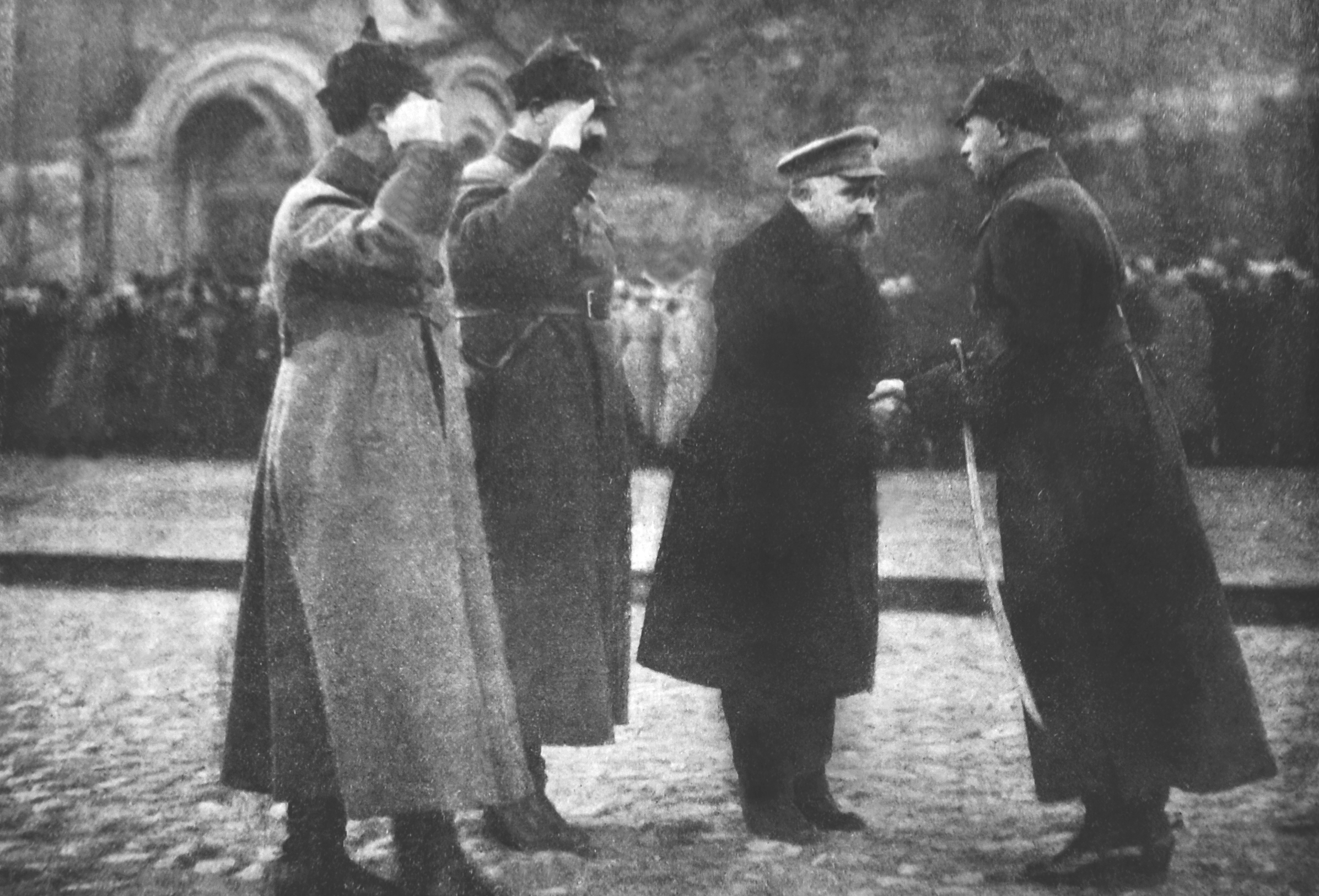
Lev Kamenev, acting Chairman of the Council of People's Commissars (Premier) Soviet Union, greeted on the military parade to celebrate 6th anniversary of the October revolution, 7 November 1923

With Trotsky mainly on the sidelines through a persistent illness, the Zinoviev-Kamenev-Stalin triumvirate collapsed in April 1925, although the political situation was hanging in the balance for the rest of the year. All sides spent most of 1925 lining up support behind the scenes for the December Communist Party Congress. Stalin struck an alliance with Nikolai Bukharin, a Communist Party theoretician and Pravda editor, and the Soviet prime minister Alexei Rykov. Zinoviev and Kamenev strengthened their alliance with Lenin's widow, Nadezhda Krupskaya. Also, they aligned with Grigori Sokolnikov, the People's Commissar for Finance and a candidate Politburo member. Their alliance became known as the New Opposition.

The struggle became more open at the September 1925 meeting of the Central Committee, and came to a head at the XIVth Party Congress in December 1925, when Kamenev publicly demanded the removal of Stalin from the position of the General Secretary. With only the Leningrad delegation (controlled by Zinoviev) behind them, Zinoviev and Kamenev found themselves in a tiny minority and were soundly defeated. Trotsky remained silent during the Congress. Zinoviev was re-elected to the Politburo, but Kamenev was demoted from a full member to a non-voting member, and Sokolnikov was dropped altogether. Stalin succeeded in having more of his allies elected to the Politburo.

== Opposition to Stalin (1926–1927) ==
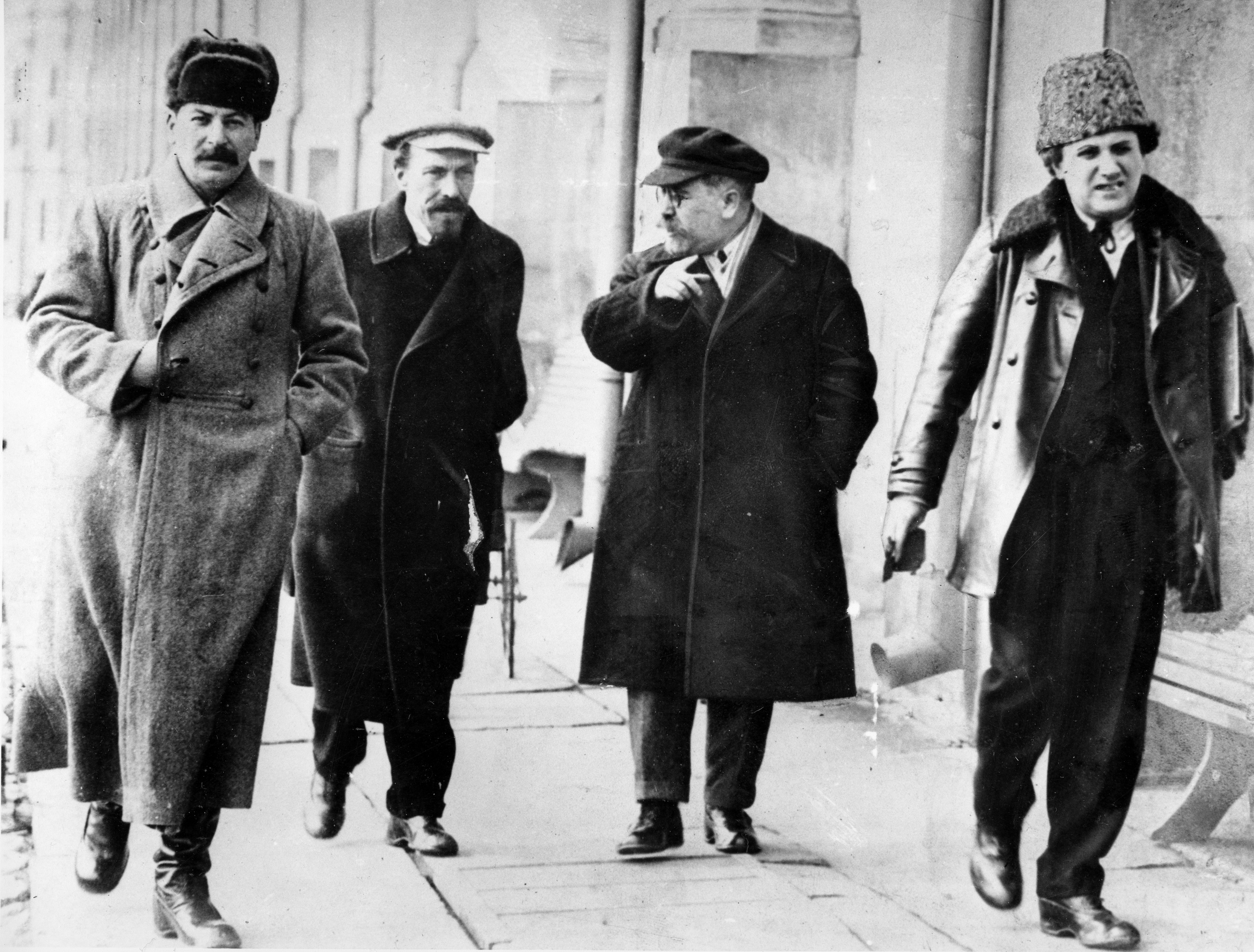
The photo shows the leadership of the USSR: Joseph Stalin, General Secretary of the Communist Party; Alexei Rykov, Chairman of the Council of People's Commissars (Prime Minister); Lev Kamenev, Deputy Chairman of the Council of People's Commissars (Deputy Prime Minister); Grigory Zinoviev, Chairman of the Comintern's executive committee. Apr 1925.

In early 1926, Zinoviev, Kamenev and their supporters gravitated closer to Trotsky's supporters, with the two groups allying, which became known as the United Opposition. During a new period of intra-party fighting between the July 1926 meeting of the Central Committee and the XVth Party Conference in October 1926, the United Opposition was defeated, and Kamenev lost his Politburo seat at the Conference.

"He is an unprincipled intriguer, who subordinates everything to the preservation of his own power. He changes his theory according to whom he needs to get rid of."

— Bukharin in conversations with Kamenev on Stalin's theoretical position, 1928.

Kamenev continued to oppose Stalin throughout 1926 and 1927, resulting in his expulsion from the Central Committee in October 1927. After the expulsion of Zinoviev and Trotsky from the Communist Party on 12 November 1927, Kamenev was the United Opposition's chief spokesman within the Party, representing its position at the XVth Party Congress in December 1927. Kamenev used the occasion to appeal for reconciliation among the groups. His speech was interrupted 24 times by his opponents – Bukharin, Ryutin, and Kaganovich, making it clear that Kamenev's attempts were futile. The Congress declared United Opposition views incompatible with Communist Party membership; it expelled Kamenev and dozens of leading Oppositionists from the Party. This paved the way for mass expulsions in 1928 of rank-and-file Oppositionists, as well as sending prominent Left Oppositionists into internal exile.

Kamenev's first marriage, which had begun to disintegrate in 1920, as a result of his reputed affair with the British sculptor Clare Sheridan, ended in divorce in 1928 when he left Olga Kameneva and married Tatiana Glebova. They had a son together, Vladimir Glebov (1929–1994).

== Submission to Stalin and execution ==
While Trotsky remained firm in his opposition to Stalin after his expulsion from the Party and subsequent exile, Zinoviev and Kamenev capitulated almost immediately and called on their supporters to follow suit. They wrote open letters acknowledging their mistakes and were readmitted to the Communist Party after a six-month cooling-off period. They never regained their Central Committee seats but were given mid-level positions within the Soviet bureaucracy. Kamenev and, indirectly, Zinoviev, were courted by Bukharin, then at the beginning of his short and ill-fated struggle with Stalin, in the summer of 1928. This activity was soon reported to Joseph Stalin and used against Bukharin as proof of his factionalism.

Zinoviev and Kamenev remained politically inactive until October 1932, when they were expelled from the Communist Party, after receiving an oppositionist group's appeal but not informing the party of their activities during the Ryutin Affair. After again admitting their alleged errors, they were readmitted in December 1933. They were forced to make self-flagellating speeches at the 17th Party Congress in January 1934, where Stalin paraded his erstwhile political opponents, showing them to be defeated and outwardly contrite.

The murder of Sergei Kirov on 1 December 1934 was a catalyst for what are called Stalin's Great Purges, as he initiated show trials and executions of opponents. Grigory Zinoviev, Kamenev and their closest associates were again expelled from the Communist Party and arrested.

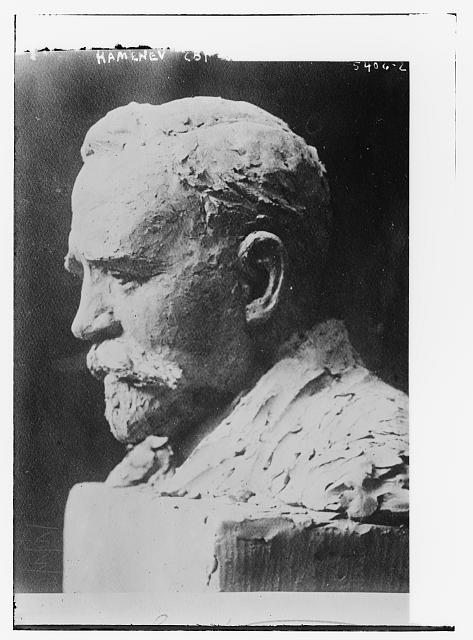
Bust of Kamenev by Clare Sheridan

During this time Kamenev wrote a letter to Stalin, saying:

At a time when my soul is filled with nothing but love for the party and its leadership, when, having lived through hesitations and doubts, I can boldly say that I learned to highly trust the Central Committee's every step and every decision you, Comrade Stalin, make. I have been arrested for my ties to people who are strange and disgusting to me.

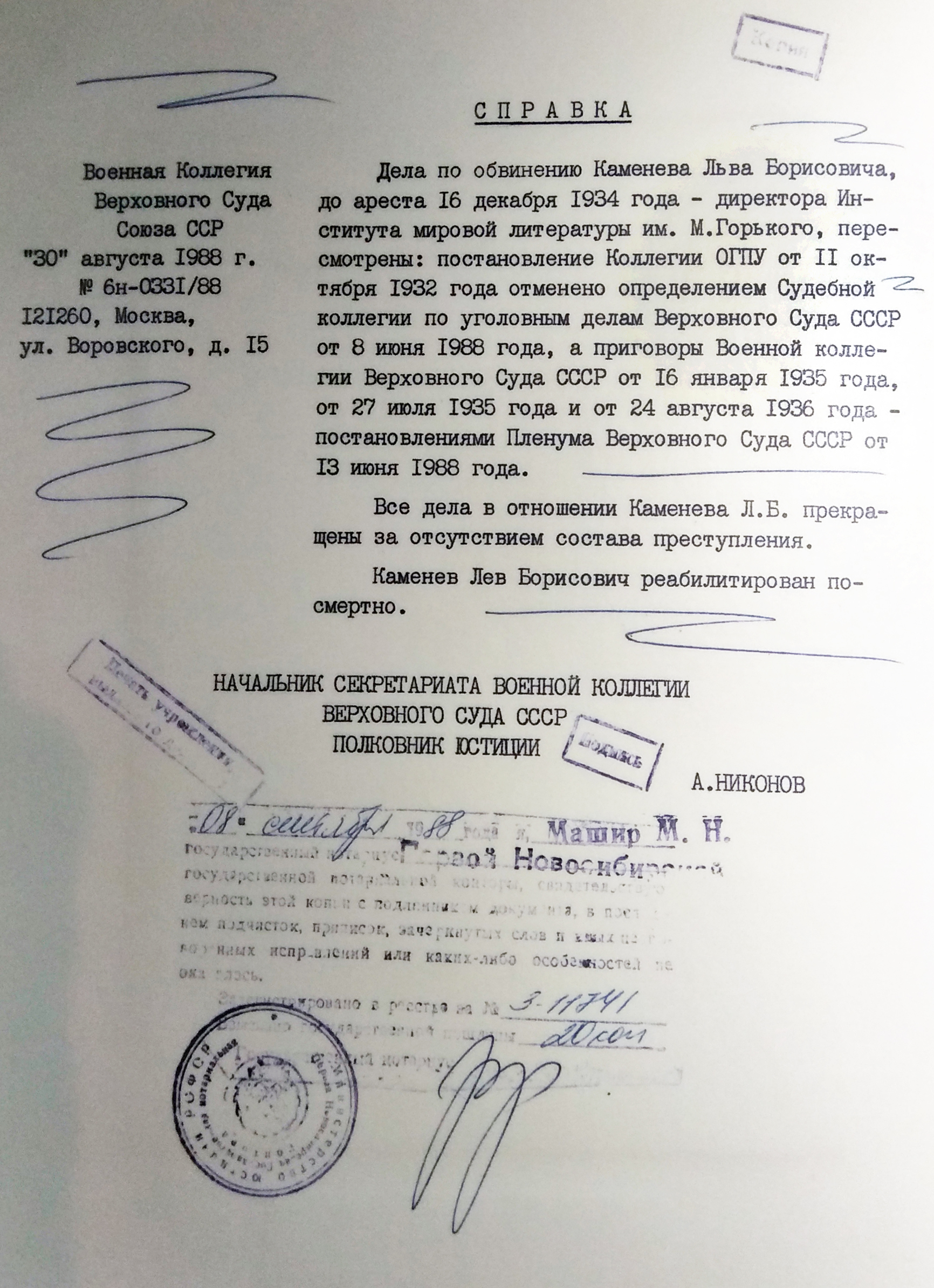
The act of rehabilitation of Kamenev

The men were tried in January 1935 and were forced to admit "moral complicity" in Kirov's assassination. Zinoviev was sentenced to ten years in prison and Kamenev to five. After the sentence the writer Maxim Gorky pleaded with Stalin for Kamenev's release, but was ignored. Kamenev was charged separately in early 1935 in connection with the Kremlin Affair, in which his nephew Nikolai Rosenfeld, a Moscow thermal power engineer, was involved as a major participant. Although he refused to confess, he was sentenced to ten years in prison. In August 1936, after months of rehearsal in Soviet secret police prisons, Zinoviev, Kamenev and 14 others, mostly Old Bolsheviks, were put on trial again. This time, the charges included forming a terrorist organization that killed Kirov and tried to kill Stalin and other leaders of the Soviet government. This Trial of the Sixteen was one of the Moscow Show Trials and set the stage for subsequent show trials. Old Bolsheviks were forced to confess increasingly elaborate and monstrous crimes, including espionage, poisoning and sabotage. Like the other defendants, Kamenev was found guilty and executed by firing squad on 25 August 1936. The fate of his body is unknown. In 1988, during perestroika, Kamenev, Zinoviev and his co-defendants were formally rehabilitated by the Military Collegium of the Supreme Court of the Soviet Union.

== Fate of the family ==
After Kamenev's execution, his relatives suffered similar fates. Kamenev's second son, Yu. L. Kamenev was executed on 30 January 1938, at the age of 17. His eldest son, Air Force officer A.L. Kamenev, was executed on 15 July 1939 at 33. His first wife, Olga, was executed on 11 September 1941, in the Medvedev forest outside Oryol, together with Christian Rakovsky, Maria Spiridonova, and 160 other prominent political prisoners. Only his youngest son, Vladimir Glebov, survived Stalin's prisons and labor camps, living until 1994.

== See also ==
- Outline of the Russian Revolution and Civil War
- Bibliography of the Russian Revolution and Civil War
- Bibliography of Stalinism and the Soviet Union
- Index of Old Bolsheviks
- Index of articles related to the Russian Revolution and Civil War

== Notes ==
Political offices
Preceded by Nikolai Chkheidze	Chairman of the Central Executive Committee of the All-Russian Congress of Soviets; 1917	Succeeded by Yakov Sverdlov
