= Politburo of the 10th Congress of the Russian Communist Party (Bolsheviks) =

Supreme political authority in Soviet Union 1921–1922

Politburo of the 10th Congress

16 March 1921 – 3 April 1922

The Politburo of the 10th Congress of the Russian Communist Party (Bolsheviks) was in session from 16 March 1921 to 3 April 1922.

== Composition ==
=== Members ===
Members of the Politburo of the 10th Congress of the Russian Communist Party (Bolsheviks)
Name	Cyrillic	9th POL	11th POL	Birth	Death	PM	Ethnicity	Gender	Portrait
Lev Kamenev	Лев Ка́менев	Old	Reelected	1883	1936	1901	Jewish-Russian (Note: His father was Jewish and his mother Russian)	Male	
Vladimir Lenin	Владимир Ленин	Old	Reelected	1870	1924	1898	Russian	Male	
Joseph Stalin	Ио́сиф Ста́лин	Old	Reelected	1878	1953	1898	Georgian	Male	
Leon Trotsky	Лев Тро́цкий	Old	Reelected	1879	1940	1917	Jewish	Male	
Grigory Zinoviev	Григо́рий Зино́вьев	Candidate	Reelected	1883	1936	1901	Jewish	Male	

=== Candidates ===
Candidate Members of the Politburo of the 10th Congress of the Russian Communist Party (Bolsheviks)
Name	Cyrillic	9th POL	11th POL	Birth	Death	PM	Ethnicity	Gender	Portrait
Nikolai Bukharin	Никола́й Буха́рин	Candidate	Candidate	1888	1938	1906	Russian	Male	
Mikhail Kalinin	Михаил Калинин	Candidate	Candidate	1875	1946	1898	Russian	Male	
Vyacheslav Molotov	Вячеслав Молотов	New	Candidate	1890	1986	1906	Russian	Male	
