= Stanislav Strumilin =

Soviet economist and statistician (1877–1974)

Stanislav Gustavovich Strumilin (Strumillo-Petrashkevich) (Russian: Станисла́в Гу́ставович Струми́лин (Струми́лло-Петрашке́вич); 29 January 1877, Dashkovtsy, Podolia Governorate – 25 January 1974, Moscow) was a Soviet economist and statistician. He played a leading role in the analysis of the planned economy of the Soviet type, including modeling, development of the five year plans and calculation of national income. His particular contributions include the "Strumilin index", a measure of labor productivity, and the "norm coefficient", relating to analysis of investment activity.

== Biography ==
Strumilin was born into an impoverished noble family of Strumillo-Petrashkevich, descended from Marshal of the Grand Duchy of Lithuania Stanislav Petrashkovich Stromila. He joined the revolutionary movement in 1897 by becoming a member of the League of Struggle for the Emancipation of the Working Class. Strumilin then became a member of the Russian Social Democratic Labour Party in 1899 and joined its Menshevik faction.

He graduated from Petrograd Polytechnical Institute in 1914. After the October Revolution he worked on setting up the Soviet planned economy while he was appointed to a professorship in economics at the Moscow State University. Stanislav Strumilin worked as the head of the Statistics Department of the Petrograd Regional Commissariat of Labor and from 1919 head of the statistics All-Union Central Council of Trade Unions. In 1919 he investigated the impact of the illicit black market in Petrograd, concluding that the disparity in the average food consumption of the workers – which exceeded which their incomes – could be explained as being provided by black market barter. He became a member of the Russian Communist Party (b) in 1923.

From 1921 to 1937 he worked at the State Planning Committee (Gosplan). In the 30s, he was deputy Chairman of Gosplan and a member of its Presidium. From 1932 to 1934 he was deputy head of the Central Directorate of National Economic Accounting. From 1931 he was member of the Academy of Sciences of the Soviet Union.

Strumilin was also a professor at the Moscow State University, Plekhanov Institute of National Economy, Moscow State Economic Institute, Moscow Financial Institute and Academy of Social Sciences under the Central Committee of the CPSU.

In the sixties he gained an international reputation in the field of the economics of education following the publication of "The economics of education in the USSR" by UNESCO.

== Selected works ==
- "Bogatsvo i Trud" (Wealth and Labor) (1905)
- "Problemikiy Ekonomikiy Truda" (Problems of the Economics of Labor) (1925)
- "Otcherkiy Sovetskoy Ekonomikiy" (Essays on the Soviet Economy) (1928)
- "Promiyshlenniy Perevorot v Rossiy" (The Industrial Revolution in Russia) (1944)
- "The Time Factor in Capital Investment Projects" (published in 1946 in USSR, in 1951 published in English by International Economic Association)
- "Istoriya Chernoi Metalurgii v SSSR” (The history of metallurgical industry in USSR) (1954)
- "The economics of education in the USSR" (1962)
