= Bureau of the Central Committee of the Russian Communist Party (bolsheviks) =

The Bureaus of the Central Committee of the Russian Communist Party (bolsheviks) (Russian: Бюро ЦК РКП(б)), later Bureaus of the Central Committee of the All-Union Communist Party (bolsheviks) (Russian: Бюро ЦК ВКП(б)) were regional representatives of the RCP(b) Central Committee to coordinate the activities of the party and state organs. They were created in gubernias (major subdivisions in early Soviet Russia), later oblasts and krais. Created as early as in 1918, their goal initial was to overcome the weakness and inexperience of the local party organs and difficulties of communication, especially with remote regions.

The following bureaus existed.

- March 1918 — March 1919: Petrograd (Петроградское); created to ensure the continuity during the moving of the Soviet capital from Petrograd to Moscow
- 1918-1924: Siberian Bureau, Sibburo (Сибирское, Сиббюро),
- 1920-1922: Кавказское (1921 spin-off: Юго-Восточное)
- 1918-1919: Урало-Сибирское
- 1921-1924: Юго-Восточное, to handle Don River area and North Caucasus
- Уральское
- 1920-1922: Туркестанское (renamed to Среднеазиатское)
- 1922-1936: Среднеазиатское
- 1920-1922: Far Eastern Buro, Dalburo (Дальневосточное, Дальбюро), spun off the Sibburo to handle the affairs of the Far Eastern Republic
- 1921-1927: North-Eastern (Северо-Западное) (Northern ( Северное) during 1921)
- 1922: Киргизское (Казахское)
