= Congress of the Communist Party of the Soviet Union =

Supreme decision-making body of the Communist Party of the Soviet Union

Congress of the Communist Party of the Soviet Union Съезд Коммунистической партии Советского Союза
- Emblem of the CPSU

Type
- Type: Party meeting
- Term limits: Various, eventually five years

History
- Established: 1898
- Disbanded: 1990

Leadership
- Authority: Statute of the CPSU
- Jurisdiction: Communist Party of the Soviet Union

Elections
- First election: First session 1917
- Last election: Last session 1990

Meeting place
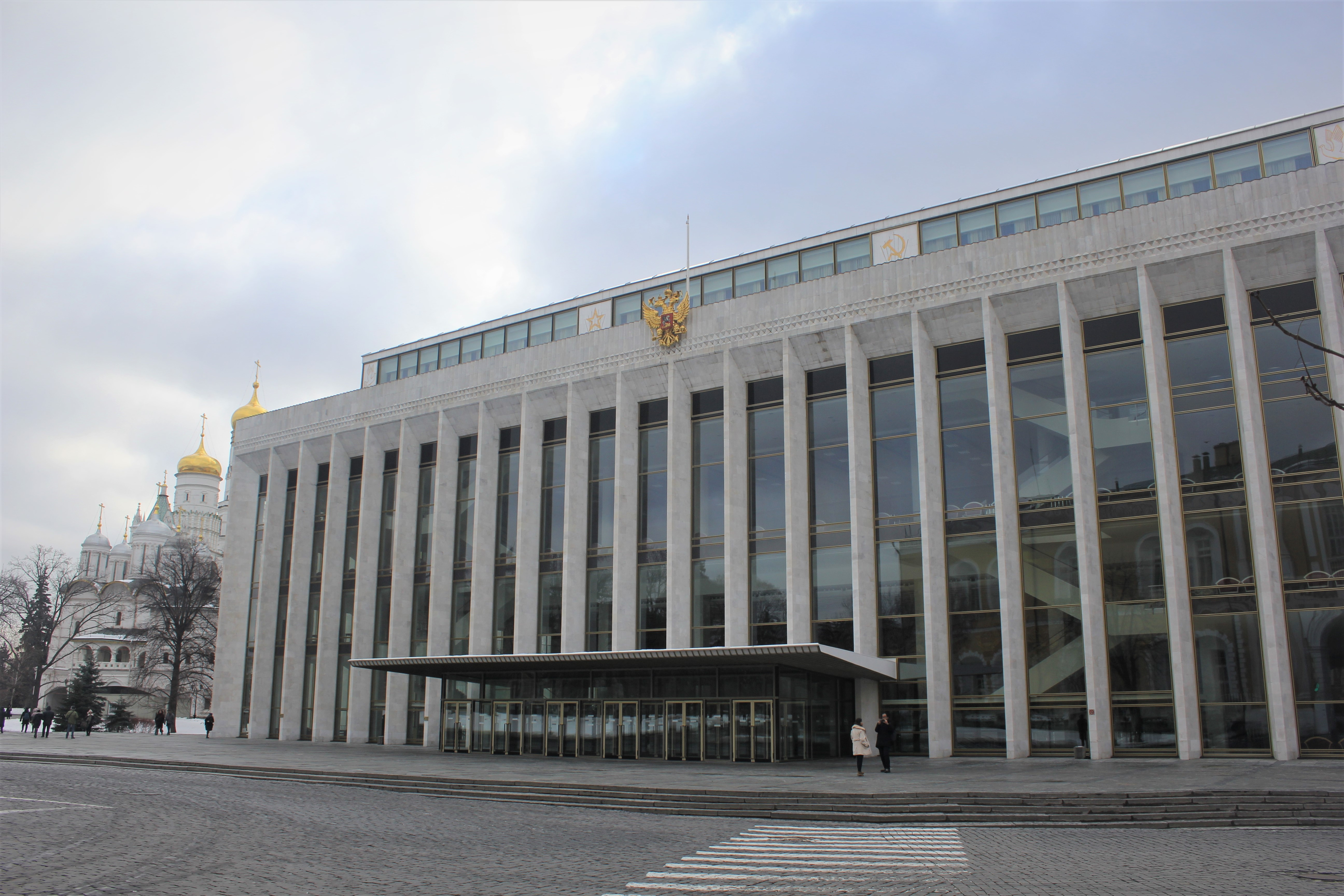
- Kremlin Palace of Congresses; Moscow, Soviet Union

The Congress of the Communist Party of the Soviet Union (Russian: Съезд Коммунистической партии Советского Союза, romanized: S"ezd Kommunisticheskoy partii Sovetskovo Soyuza) was the supreme decision-making body of the Communist Party of the Soviet Union. Its meetings served as convention of all party delegates and their predecessors.

Between the congresses the party was ruled by the Central Committee. Over the course of the party's history, the name was changed in accordance with the current name of the party at the time. The frequency of party congresses varied with the meetings being annual events in the 1920s while no congress was held at all between 1939 and 1952. After the death of Joseph Stalin, the congresses were held every five years.

== Keys ==
Abbreviations
| CC | Central Committee |
| CAC | Central Auditing Commission |
| FM | Full member (a member with voting rights). |
| CM | Candidate member (a member without voting rights). |
| VD | Voting delegate (a delegate who can vote). |
| CD | Consultative delegate (a delegate without voting rights). |
| Report | CC Report and CAC Report, a document which briefs delegates about the period since the last congress and future work. |
| Charter | Charter of the Communist Party of the Soviet Union, the fundamental governing document of the CPSU. |
| PMR | Party members represented at the congress by delegates (the party membership at the time). |

== Convocations ==
| Congress | Duration (start—end) | Delegates | Elected | | CC Report (presented by) | CAC Report (presented by) | Charter (amendments) | Program (amendments) | PMR | Place | Location |
| Congress | Duration (start—end) | Delegates | CC | CAC | CC Report (presented by) | CAC Report (presented by) | Charter (amendments) | Program (amendments) | PMR | Place | Location |
|---|---|---|---|---|---|---|---|---|---|---|---|
| 1st Congress; 3 days | 1 March – 3 March 1898 | 9 | 3 | — | — | — | — | — | — | Minsk | (Russia) Russian Empire |
| 2nd Congress; 25 days 1903 election | 17 July – 10 August 1903 | 51 VD – 12 CD | 3 FM – 2 PM | — | — | — | Amendment | 1st Program | — | Brussels | Belgium |
| 2nd Congress; 25 days 1903 election | 17 July – 10 August 1903 | 51 VD – 12 CD | 3 FM – 2 PM | — | — | — | Amendment | 1st Program | — | London | United Kingdom |
| 3rd Congress; 16 days 1905 election | 12 April – 27 April 1905 | 24 VD – 14 CD | 4 FM; 4 AP; 1 PM | — | — | — | Amendment | — | — | London | United Kingdom |
| 4th Congress; 16 days 1906 election | 10 April – 25 April 1906 | 112 VD – 22 CD | 10 FM – 1 PM | — | — | — | Amendment | — | — | Stockholm | Sweden |
| 5th Congress; 20 days 1907 election | 30 April – 19 May 1907 | 343 VD – 41 CD | 11 FM; 21 CM; 6 PM | — | R. Abramovitch; A. Bogdanov; J. Martov | — | — | — | 178,000 | London | United Kingdom |
| 6th Congress; 9 days 1917 election | 26 July – 3 August 1917 | 157 VD – 110 CD | 21 FM – 10 CM | — | None | — | Amendment | 2nd Program | 177,000 | Petrograd | (Russia) Russian Republic |
| 7th Congress; 3 days 1917–1918 election | 6 March – 8 March 1918 | 47 VD – 59 CD | 19 FM – 8 CM | — | V. Lenin & Y. Sverdlov | — | — | — | 233,000 | Petrograd | Soviet Russia |
| 8th Congress; 6 days 1918–1919 election | 18 March – 23 March 1919 | 301 VD – 102 CD | 19 FM – 8 CM | 3 | V. Lenin | — | Amendment | — | 313,766 | Moscow | Soviet Russia |
| 9th Congress; 8 days 1919–1920 election | 29 March – 5 April 1920 | 301 VD – 102 CD | 19 FM – 12 CM | None | V. Lenin | — | — | — | 611,978 | Moscow | Soviet Russia |
| 10th Congress; 9 days 1921–1922 election | 8 March – 16 March 1921 | 715 VD – 553 CD | 25 FM – 15 CM | None | V. Lenin | — | — | — | 732,521 | Moscow | Soviet Russia |
| 11th Congress; 7 days 1921–1922 election | 27 March – 2 April 1922 | 694 VD – 296 CD | 27 FM – 17 CM | None | V. Lenin | V. Nogin | — | — | 532,000 | Moscow | Soviet Russia |
| 12th Congress; 9 days 1922–1923 election | 17 April – 25 April 1923 | 408 VD – 417 CD | 40 FM – 17 CM | 3 | L. Kamenev | V. Nogin | Amendment | — | 386,000 | Moscow | Soviet Union |
| 13th Congress; 9 days 1923–1924 election | 23 May – 31 May 1924 | 748 VD – 416 CD | 53 FM – 34 CM | 3 | G. Zinoviev | D. Kursky | — | — | 735,881 FM – 127,741 CM | Moscow | Soviet Union |
| 14th Congress; 14 days 1925 election | 18 December – 31 December 1925 | 665 VD – 641 CD | 63 FM – 43 CM | 7 | J. Stalin | D. Kursky | Amendment | — | 643,000 FM – 445,000 CM | Moscow | Soviet Union |
| 15th Congress; 18 days 1927 election | 2 December – 19 December 1927 | 898 VD – 771 CD | 71 FM – 50 CM | 9 | J. Stalin | D. Kursky | Amendment | — | 887,233 FM – 348,957 CM | Moscow | Soviet Union |
| 16th Congress; 18 days 1929–1930 election | 26 June – 13 July 1930 | 1268 VD – 891 CD | 71 FM – 67 CM | 13 | J. Stalin | M. Vladimirsky | — | — | 1,260,874 FM – 711,609 CM | Moscow | Soviet Union |
| 17th Congress; 16 days 1933–1934 election | 26 January – 10 February 1934 | 1225 VD – 736 CD | 71 FM – 68 CM | 22 | J. Stalin | M. Vladimirsky | Amendment | — | 1,872,488 FM – 935,298 CM | Moscow | Soviet Union |
| 18th Congress; 12 days 1938–1939 election | 10 March – 21 March 1939 | 1569 VD – 466 CD | 71 FM – 13 CM | 13 | J. Stalin | M. Vladimirsky | Amendment | — | 1,588,852 FM – 888,814 CM | Moscow | Soviet Union |
| 19th Congress; 10 days 1951–1952 election | 5 October – 14 October 1952 | 1192 VD – 167 CD | 125 FM – 111 CM | 37 | G. Malenkov | P. Moskatov | Amendment | — | 6,000,000 FM – 900,000 CM | Moscow | Soviet Union |
| 20th Congress; 12 days 1955–1956 election | 14 February – 25 February 1956 | 1349 VD – 81 CD | 133 FM – 122 CM | 63 | N. Khrushchev | P. Moskatov | Amendment | — | 6,795,896 FM – 419,609 CM | Moscow | Soviet Union |
| 21st Congress; 10 days None | 27 January – 5 February 1959 | 1261 VD – 106 CD | None | None | N. Khrushchev | — | — | — | 7,622,356 FM – 616,775 CM | Moscow | Soviet Union |
| 22nd Congress; 15 days 1960–1961 election | 17 October – 31 October 1961 | 4394 VD – 405 CD | 175 FM – 155 CM | 65 | N. Khrushchev | A. Gorkin | Amendment | 3rd Program | 8,872,516 FM – 843,489 CM | Moscow | Soviet Union |
| 23rd Congress; 11 days 1965–1966 election | 29 March – 8 April 1966 | 4619 VD – 323 CD | 195 FM – 165 CM | 79 | L. Brezhnev | N. Muravyova | Amendment | Amendment | 11,673,676 FM – 797,403 CM | Moscow | Soviet Union |
| 24th Congress; 11 days 1970–1971 election | 30 March – 9 April 1971 | 4740 VD – 223 CD | 245 FM – 155 CM | 81 | L. Brezhnev | G. Sizov | — | — | 13,810,089 FM – 645,232 CM | Moscow | Soviet Union |
| 25th Congress; 10 days 1975–1976 election | 24 February – 5 March 1976 | 4998 | 287 FM – 139 CM | 85 | L. Brezhnev | G. Sizov | — | — | 15,365,600 FM – 628,876 CM | Moscow | Soviet Union |
| 26th Congress; 9 days 1980–1981 election | 23 February – 3 March 1981 | 4994 | 319 FM – 151 CM | 75 | L. Brezhnev | G. Sizov | — | — | 16,732,408 FM – 698,005 CM | Moscow | Soviet Union |
| 27th Congress; 10 days 1985–1986 election | 25 February – 6 March 1986 | 4993 | 307 FM – 170 CM | 83 | M. Gorbachev | G. Sizov | Amendment | Amendment | 18,975,725 FM – 512,097 CM | Moscow | Soviet Union |
| 28th Congress; 12 days 1990–1991 election | 2 July – 13 July 1990 | 4683 | 412 | — | M. Gorbachev | — | Amendment | Failed to approve program | 18,856,113 FM – 372,104 CM | Moscow | Soviet Union |

== See also ==
- Organization of the Communist Party of the Soviet Union
