= Communist Party Congress =

Communist Party Congress could refer to:

Ruling or former ruling communist parties:

- National Congress of the Chinese Communist Party
- Congress of the Socialist Unity Party of Germany
- National Congress of the Communist Party of Vietnam
- Congress of the Romanian Communist Party
- Congress of the Communist Party of the Soviet Union
  - Congresses of the Communist Party of Lithuania

Non-ruling communist party congresses:

- Congresses of the Communist Party of Brazil
