= 17th Congress of the All-Union Communist Party (Bolsheviks) =

1934 meeting of Soviet delegates

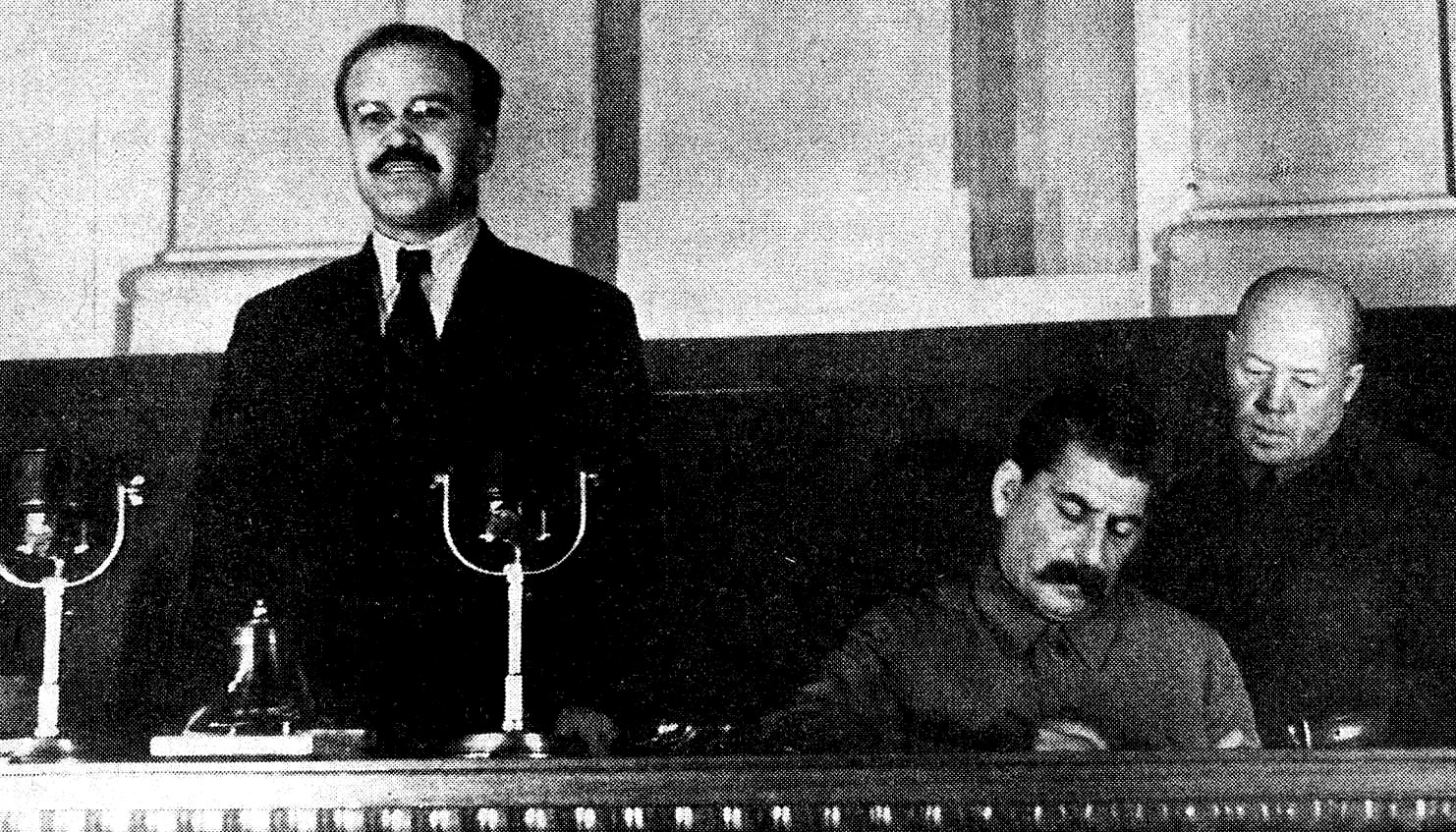
Molotov, Stalin and Poskrebyshev at the 17th Congress of the All-Union Communist Party

The 17th Congress of the All-Union Communist Party (Bolsheviks) (Russian: XVII съезд ВКП(б)), popularly known as the Executed Congress (as the majority of those elected at the Congress were arrested and executed during the Great Purge) was held from 26 January to 10 February 1934. The congress was attended by 1,225 delegates with a casting vote and 736 delegates with a consultative vote, representing 1,872,488 party members and 935,298 candidate members.

== Background ==
By 1933, Stalin's dominance was empirically secured through patronage networks and the OGPU's surveillance, which monitored and neutralized residual opposition. Yet claims of party unity masked underlying fractures, as evidenced by the Ryutin affair, a 194-page manifesto by Martemyan Ryutin denouncing Stalin as an "unscrupulous intriguer" and "gravedigger of the Revolution" for deviating from Leninism via forced collectivization and personality cult, while demanding his removal and policy reversals. The OGPU arrested Ryutin and 24 associates, exiling them and expelling figures like Kamenev and Zinoviev for failing to report it.

== Events ==
The 17th Congress of the All-Union Communist Party (Bolsheviks) convened on January 26, 1934, in the Great Hall of the Kremlin in Moscow, marking the first party congress since 1929. The opening session immediately transitioned into the presentation of the Central Committee's report by Stalin, which reviewed the party's work over the preceding four years and set the tone for the proceedings. His report emphasized industrial and agricultural advancements amid ongoing collectivization efforts. The agenda was adopted unanimously, encompassing key elements such as the Central Committee report, contributions from the Central Control Commission, and addresses by foreign communist delegations. Procedural votes on organizational matters, including the agenda and session rules, passed without dissent, highlighting the tightly orchestrated environment where opposition was precluded. Over the initial days, delegates began delivering hundreds of speeches strictly aligned with the leadership's positions, with no deviations permitted in the formal structure.

During the elections to the 17th Central Committee Stalin received a significant number (over a hundred, although the precise number is unknown; one account stated that he received 292 negative votes) of negative votes, whereas only three delegates crossed out the name of the increasingly popular, Stalin-aligned Leningrad party boss, Sergei Kirov. The results were subsequently covered up on Stalin's orders and it was officially reported that Stalin also received only three negative votes.

During the Congress a group of veteran party members approached Kirov with the suggestion that he replace Stalin as the party leader. Kirov declined the offer and reported the conversation to Stalin, as he was very much loyal to Stalin.

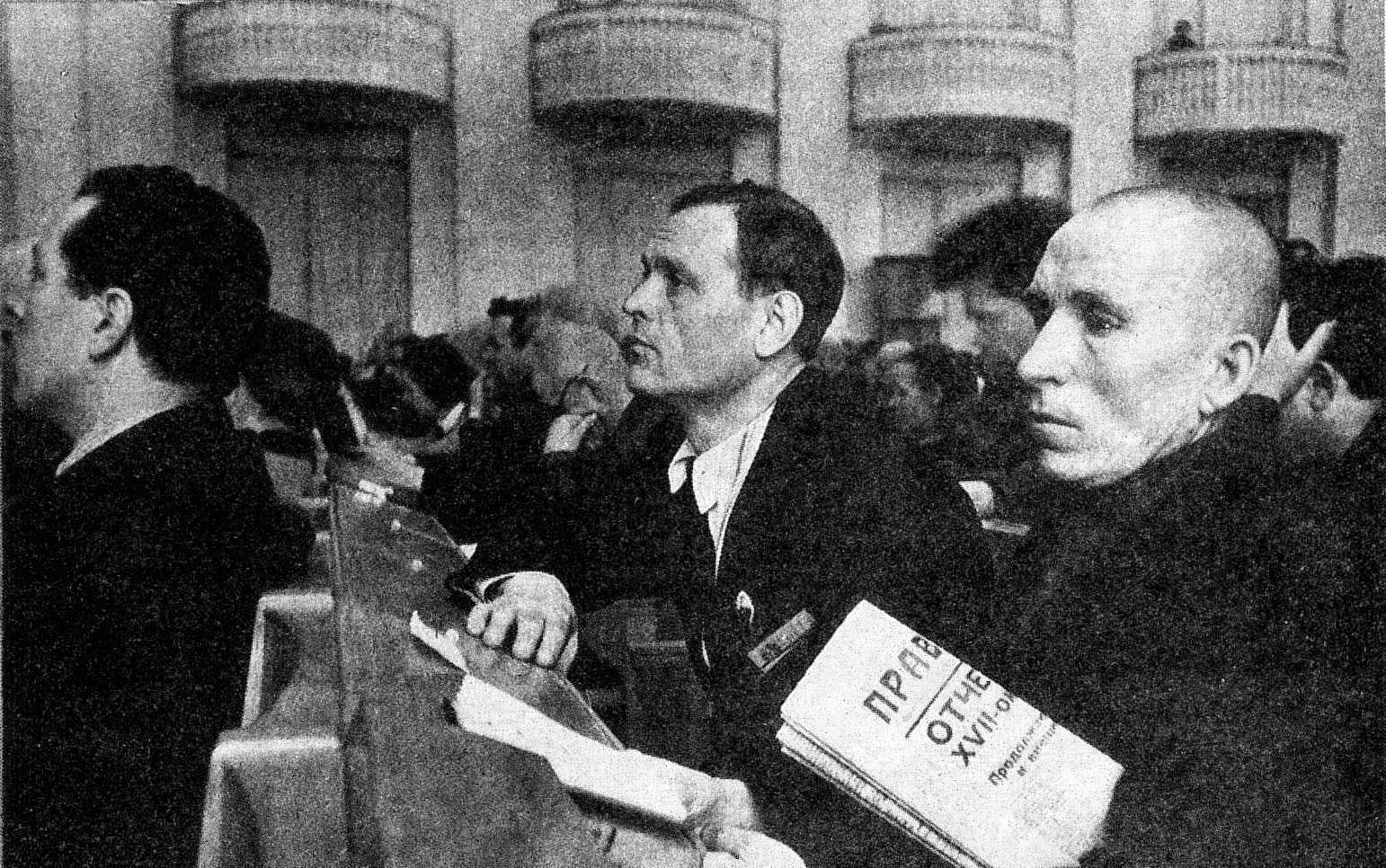
A delegate at Bolshevik 17th Congress of the All-Union Communist Party at the Grand Kremlin Palace holding a Pravda newspaper in 1934

In public, Stalin was acclaimed, not merely as the leader of the party, but as a towering, universal genius in every human sphere. All his former opponents spoke approvingly of him (other than Leon Trotsky, who had been exiled in 1929), and pledged their total support to the party line. At that time, it was dubbed as the Congress of Victors to celebrate the success of the First Five-Year Plan and the completion of collectivization.

In his speech to the 20th Party Congress, Nikita Khrushchev reported that "of the 139 members and candidates of the Central Committee who were elected at the 17th Congress, 98 persons, i.e., 70 per cent, were arrested and shot (mostly in 1937–1938)." In addition, Khrushchev said that "of 1,966 delegates [to the 17th Congress] with either voting or advisory rights, 1,108 persons were arrested on charges of anti-revolutionary crimes, i.e., decidedly more than a majority."

At the congress Rabkrin was dissolved and its functions passed to the Sovnarkom's People's Control Commission.

By the Decree of the Council of Labor and Defense of December 11, 1933, the Directorate of Road Construction of Eastern Siberia and the Far East (Daldorstroy) was created in the city of Khabarovsk, with the task of constructing strategic highways according to the list of the government of the USSR, in the regions of Eastern Siberia and the Soviet Far East. The construction plans were announced at the 17th Congress, held in Moscow from January–February 1934, when the Second Five-Year Plan for the development of the Soviet Union was adopted. In accordance with it, it was planned to build a Vladivostok–Khabarovsk highway, with a hard (gravel) surface, 600 kilometers long.

== Agenda of the Congress ==
1. Reports by Stalin (Central Committee of the All-Union Communist Party (Bolsheviks)), Mikhail Vladimirsky (Central Revision Committee). Rudzutak and Manuilsky

2. Second five-year plan, speakers: Vyacheslav Molotov and Valerian Kuybyshev

3. Organizational issues (party and Soviet construction), speaker: Lazar Kaganovich

4. Elections to the central organs of the Party, the Central Committee, the Central Revision Committee, and the Party Control Commission.

== Aftermath ==
Following the 17th Congress, Sergei Kirov's prominent role and the widespread acclaim for his report on party work positioned him as a potential rival to Joseph Stalin, evidenced by Kirov receiving nearly unanimous support in informal voting for Central Committee positions, second only to Stalin himself. This surge in popularity, coupled with Kirov's reluctance to accept a transfer to Moscow, heightened tensions within the leadership, providing Stalin a motive to view him as a threat to centralized control.

On 1 December 1934, after the results of the 17th Party Congress, Sergei Kirov was shot and killed by Leonid Nikolaev. The assassination of Kirov following the Congress would be a bellwether for the Great Purge of 1937–1938.

== See also ==
- Congress of the Communist Party of the Soviet Union
