= Central Auditing Commission of the Communist Party of the Soviet Union =

Former supervisory organ

Central Auditing Commission (CAC; Russian: Центральная ревизионная комиссия КПСС, romanized: Centralnaya revizionnaya komissiya KPSS) was a supervisory organ within the Communist Party of the Soviet Union. It is often referred to as the Central Revision Commission, a calque of the Russian name. Similar organs existed in a number of other communist parties, which were analogous with that of the CPSU.

The Central Auditing Commission was elected by and reported to the CPSU Party Congress and its membership was just below that of the CPSU Central Committee within the intraparty bureaucratic hierarchy.

The Central Auditing Commission supervised the expeditious and proper handling of affairs by the central bodies of the Party, and audited the accounts of the treasury and the enterprises of the CPSU Central Committee.

It is not to be confused with yet another CPSU control organ: the Party Control Committee of the CPSU Central Committee, which was responsible for enforcing Party discipline.

== Chairmen ==
Period	Chairman
16 March 1921 — 22 May 1924	Viktor Nogin
31 May 1924 — 2 December 1927	Dmitry Kursky
19 December 1927 — 2 April 1951	Mikhail Vladimirsky
September 1952 — 3 February 1959	Pyotr Moskatov
3 February 1959 — 17 October 1961	Alexander Gorkin
31 October 1961 — 29 March 1966	Nonna Muravyova
8 April 1966 — 25 February 1986	Gennady Sizov
6 March 1986 — 30 September 1988	Ivan Kapitonov
1988 — 1990	Alla Nizovtseva (acting)
