= Mikhail Vladimirsky =

Russian politician (1874–1951)

- Михаил Владимирский
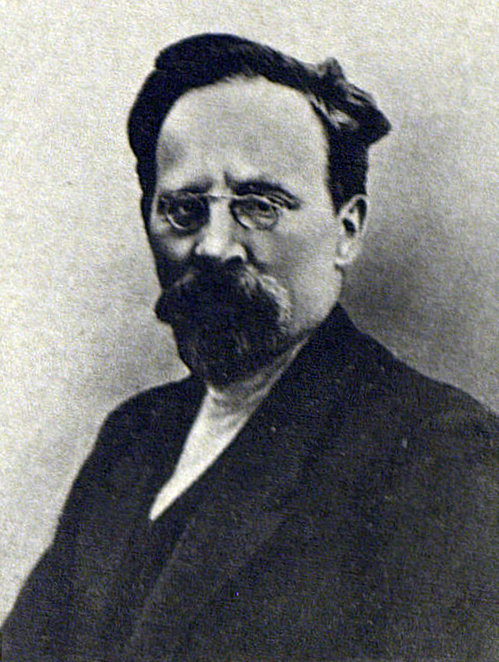
- Vladimirsky in 1926

Acting Chairman of the Central Executive Committee of the All-Russian Congress of Soviets
- In office 16 March 1919 – 30 March 1919
- Premier: Vladimir Lenin
- Preceded by: Yakov Sverdlov
- Succeeded by: Mikhail Kalinin

People's Commissar for Health of the USSR
- In office 26 January 1930 – 15 February 1934
- Premier: Alexei Rykov; Vyacheslav Molotov
- Preceded by: Nikolai Semashko
- Succeeded by: Grigory Kaminsky

Deputy Chairman of the State Economic Commission on Current Planning
- In office 1926–1927
- Leader: Gleb Krzhizhanovsky

Chairman of the Central Auditing Commission of the Communist Party
- In office 19 December 1927 – 2 April 1951
- Preceded by: Dmitry Kursky
- Succeeded by: Peter Moskatov

Personal details
- Born: 4 March 1874 Arzamas, Russian Empire
- Died: 2 April 1951 (aged 77) Moscow, Russian SFSR, Soviet Union
- Resting place: Kremlin Wall Necropolis, Moscow
- Party: RSDLP (1898–1903); RSDLP (Bolsheviks) (1903–1918); All-Union Communist Party (Bolsheviks) (1918–1951)
- Education: Humboldt University of Berlin

Mikhail Fyodorovich Vladimirsky (Russian: Михаи́л Фёдорович Влади́мирский; 4 March [O.S. 20 February] 1874 – 2 April 1951) was a Soviet politician and Bolshevik revolutionary who was for a short period of time, the Chairman of the All-Russian Central Executive Committee.

== Biography ==
Mikhail Vladimirsky was born in 1874, as the son of Orthodox archpriest and Duma-member Fyodor Vladimirsky.

He became involved with the revolutionary movement and Marxism in the early 1890s in Nizhny Novgorod Marxist circles. From 1895, as a student at the Imperial Moscow University, he began to work as a propagandist and organizer of workers' circles. At the end of 1895 united around a Marxist circle led by, Vladimirsky, they renamed Workers' Union to the Moscow Workers' Union.

In 1896, for his participation in the creation of the Moscow Workers' Union he was arrested and exiled to his home city. In 1898-1899 he was a member of the Moscow Committee of the Russian Social Democratic Labour Party. In the spring of 1899, during the student unrest, he was once again expelled from Moscow, and then left for Switzerland, where he continued his medical education. Vladimirsky joined Plekhanov's Emancipation of Labor group and collaborated in the foreign organization Iskra. After the 2nd Congress of the RSDLP (1903) he became a Bolshevik.

He was in office as acting Chairman of the Central Executive Committee of the All-Russian Congress of Soviets from 16 March 1919 to 30 March 1919 after the death of Yakov Sverdlov. He was also Deputy of Chairman of Gosplan (the State Committee for Planning) of the USSR from 1926 to 1927 and People's Commissar of Public Healthcare of the RSFSR from 1930 to 1934. In those turbulent years, he was a supporter of Stalin's line against deviations by Leon Trotsky and Nikolai Bukharin.

In 1927, Vladimirsky became chairman of the Central Auditing Commission of the Communist Party, a position he kept until his death. At time of his death, he was also a deputy of the Supreme Soviet.

Vladimirsky died on 2 April 1951 at Moscow aged 77, and was given a state funeral. His ashes were buried at the Kremlin Wall Necropolis.

== See also ==
- Outline of the Russian Revolution and Civil War
- Bibliography of the Russian Revolution and Civil War
- Bibliography of Stalinism and the Soviet Union
- Index of Old Bolsheviks
- Index of articles related to the Russian Revolution and Civil War

Political offices
Preceded by Yakov Sverdlov	Acting Chairman of the Central Executive Committee of the All-Russian Congress of Soviets; 1919	Succeeded by Mikhail Kalinin
