= Dmitry Kursky =

Soviet politician and jurist (1874–1932)

- Дмитрий Курский
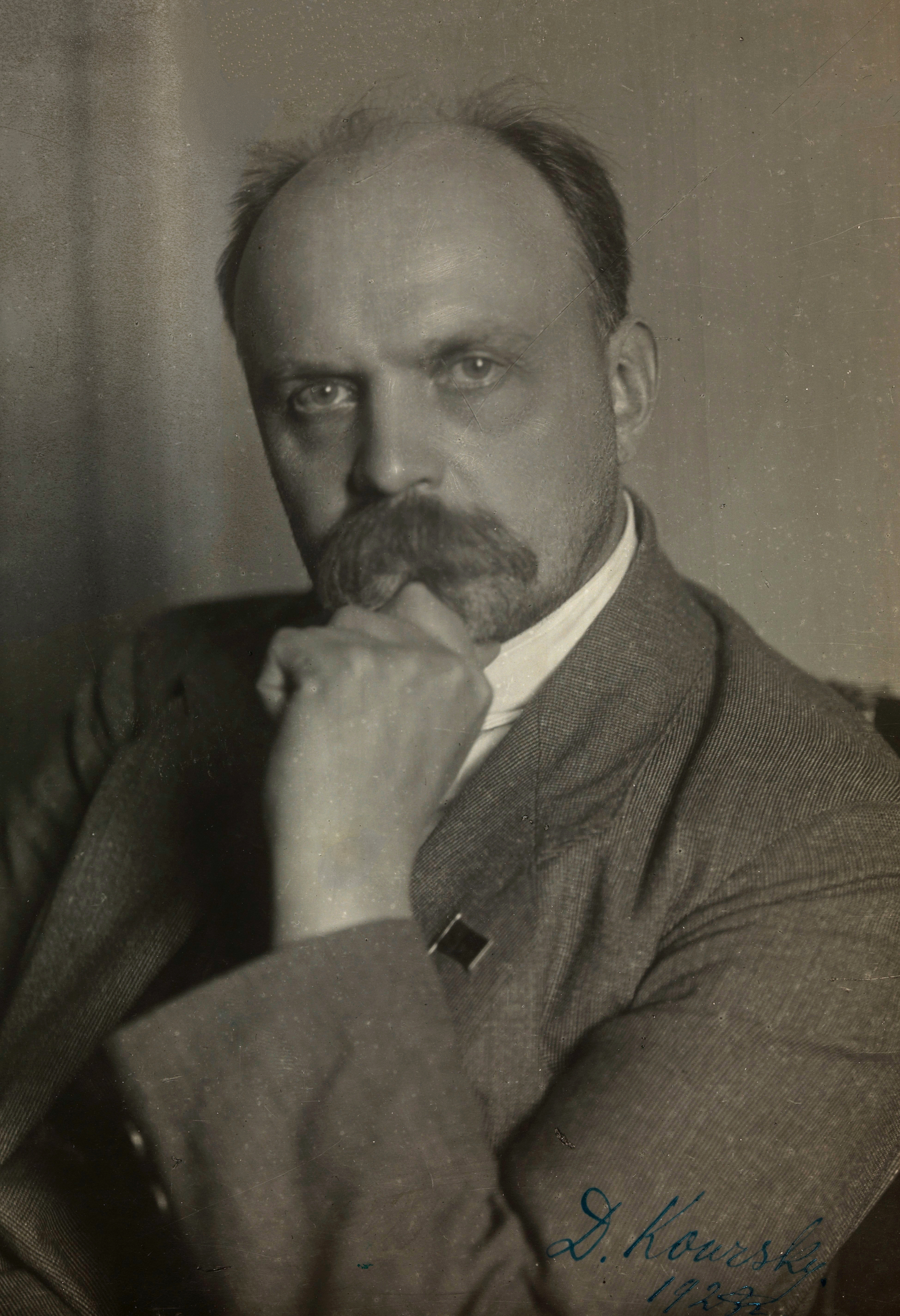
- Kursky c. 1923

Chairman of the Central Auditing Commission of the Communist Party
- In office 31 May 1924 – 2 December 1927
- Preceded by: Viktor Nogin
- Succeeded by: Mikhail Vladimirsky

Prosecutor General of the Russian SFSR
- In office 26 May 1922 – 16 January 1928
- Premier: Vladimir Lenin; Alexey Rykov
- Preceded by: Post established
- Succeeded by: Nikolai Janson

People's Commissar for Justice of the Russian SFSR
- In office 14 September 1918 – 6 July 1923
- Premier: Vladimir Lenin
- Preceded by: Pēteris Stučka
- Succeeded by: None—position dissolved

Personal details
- Born: 22 October 1874 Kiev, Russian Empire
- Died: 20 December 1932 (aged 58) Moscow, Soviet Union
- Party: RSDLP (Bolsheviks) (1904–1918); All-Union Communist Party (bolsheviks) (1918–1932)
- Occupation: Lawyer

Dmitry Ivanovich Kursky (Russian: Дми́трий Ива́нович Ку́рский; 22 October [O.S. 10 October] 1874 – 20 December 1932) was a Soviet Ukrainian jurist and statesman.

Kursky joined the Bolshevik faction of the Russian Social Democratic Labour Party in 1904. He served as the chairman of the Drissa town Soviet. He was the People's Commissar for Justice of the RSFSR and the USSR from 1918–1928. He died on 20 December 1932, aged 58.
