= 21st Congress of the Communist Party of the Soviet Union =

1959 meeting of Soviet delegates

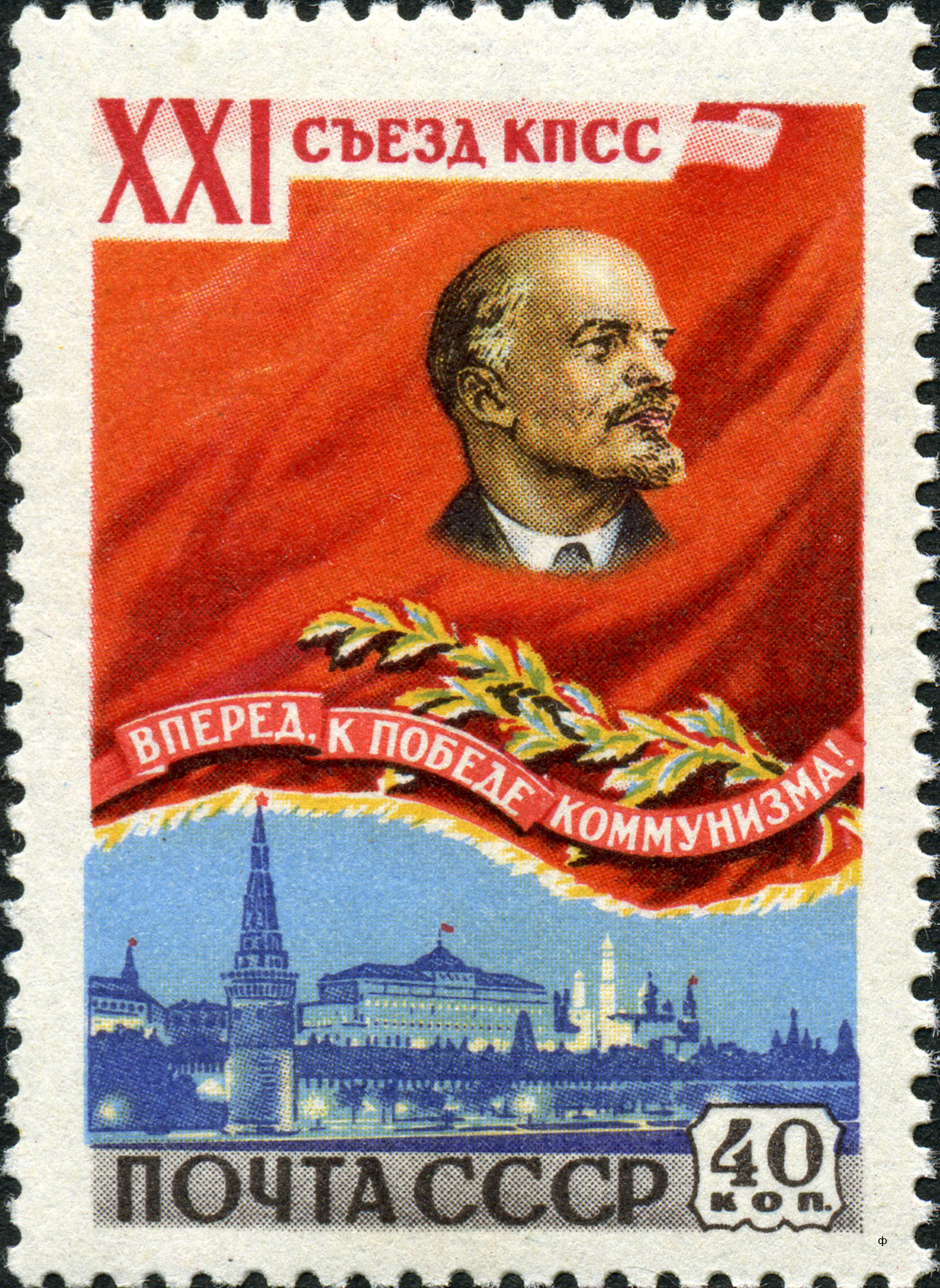
1959 USSR Postal Stamp, celebrating the 21st Congress

The 21st Congress of the Communist Party of the Soviet Union took place in Moscow, USSR 27 January - 5 February 1959. It was a mid-term or "Extraordinary" Congress, timed so that Khrushchev could try to consolidate his power over rivals in the Anti-Party Group after their attempted removal of him in 1957. The Seven-Year Plan of economic development was adopted.

== The seven-year plan ==
At the projected rate of growth, Soviet textile production would, by the end of the seven-year plan, approach the level of the United States, both in total output and per capita. The total amount of capital construction investment stipulated in the seven-year plan was equivalent to the total capital construction investment of the Soviet Union over 40 years.

The seven-year plan called for an almost fivefold increase in national income over 1940 levels, and an increase of the real incomes of workers and collective farm holders by about 40%. There were also plans to develop residential buildings and expand nurseries, kindergartens, boarding schools and nursing homes. The working week was expected to be reduced to 40 hours by 1962 and to 35 to 30 hours in 1964 to 1968. The seven-year plan also stipulated that school education at all levels would be greatly improved.

On the basis of summing up the experience of socialist construction in the Soviet Union and the achievements of the socialist system, the 21st Congress of the Communist Party of the Soviet Union raised theoretical questions about the transition from socialism to communism. In his report, Khrushchev elaborated the two stages of the communist society and the transition from socialism to communism, the material and technological basis for the construction of communist society, and the distribution of the material and spiritual wealth of the society under the conditions of socialism and communism.

== International situation ==
Khrushchev believed that the correct settlement of the German question was essential to the maintenance of peace and national security. In order to achieve German reunification, the Soviet Union supported the democratic circles of Germany government of the German Democratic Republic to form a federation. The Soviet Union was preparing to withdraw not only from Germany, but also from Poland and Hungary, where it had entered under the Warsaw Pact. The Soviet Union supported the plans of the People's Republic of Poland to establish an "atomic-free zone" in Europe and reduce conventional weapons in the area.

With regard to the Middle and Near East, the countries that had achieved national liberation would continue to need the support of the socialist countries and all progressive peoples, and the Soviet Union was strengthening friendly relations with other socialist countries. The Soviet Union was ready to sign on to the destruction of atomic, hydrogen and rocket weapons.

== The party ==
Khrushchev accused the "revisionists" in Yugoslavia of minimizing the role of the Party and, in effect, rejecting the Leninist doctrine that the Party was the guiding force in the struggle for socialism. All Communist and workers' parties would exist and struggle on the basis of complete independence and the principles of proletarian internationalism, voluntary cooperation and mutual assistance. The role of the Soviet Union was not to control other countries, but to serve as a model for other socialist countries by being the first country to blaze the path of socialism. The socialist countries were united by the common goal of liberation, hard work and universal peace.

== Relationship with China ==
Khrushchev alluded to the need to draw lessons from the Chinese communes, lest other socialist countries blindly follow China's ideas of the Great Leap Forward and inflict irreparable economic and political damage. On February 7, 1959, Zhou Enlai and Khrushchev signed an agreement on economic cooperation between China and the Soviet Union in Moscow. The agreement stipulated that between 1959 and 1967, 78 large enterprises and power stations in the fields of metallurgy, chemistry, coal, petroleum and machinery manufacturing would be built in China. The Soviet Union would provide equipment, design and various other technical assistance, with a total value of about 5 billion rubles. China would compensate the Soviet Union by supplying it with goods under existing trade agreements.

== See also ==
- Congress of the Communist Party of the Soviet Union
