= Congress of the Communist Party of Brazil =

The Communist Party of Brazil (Partido Comunista do Brasil, PC do B) has held twelve Congresses since it was founded in March 1922 as the Communist Party – Brazilian Section of the Communist International (Partido Comunista – Seção Brasileira da Internacional Comunista, PC-SBIC).

Name	Dates	Place
1st	March 25–27, 1922	Niterói
2nd	May 16–18, 1925	
3rd	December 1928 – January 1929	
4th	November 1954	
5th	August–September 1960	
6th (clandestine)	1983	
7th	May 1988	São Paulo
8th	February 3–8, 1992	Brasília
9th	October 13–15, 1997	São Paulo
10th	December 9–12, 2001	Rio de Janeiro
11th	October 20–23, 2005	Brasília
12th	November 5–8, 2009	São Paulo
13th	November 14–16, 2013	São Paulo
14th	November 17–19, 2017	Brasilia
15th	October 15–17, 2021	None (via videoconference)
