= Pyotr Moskatov =

Soviet politician

- Пётр Мускатов
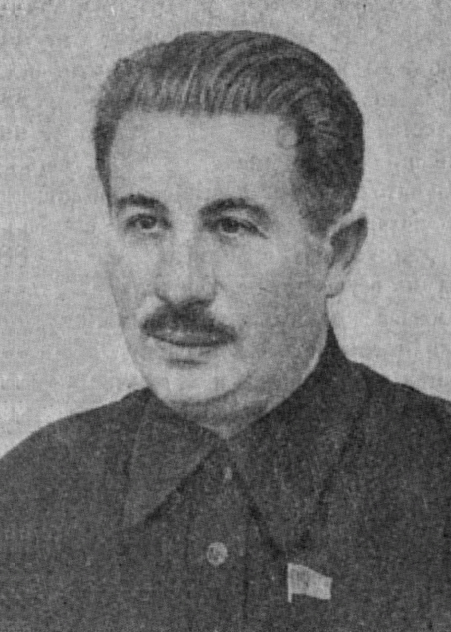
- Moskatov in 1938

Personal details
- Born: Pyotr Georgiyevich Moskatov; 3 June 1894 Taganrog, Russian Empire
- Died: 19 April 1969 (aged 74) Kerch, Crimean Oblast, Ukrainian SSR, Soviet Union
- Resting place: Novodevichy Cemetery
- Party: Communist Party of the Soviet Union (1917–1969)
- Awards: Order of Lenin; Order of the Red Banner; Order of the Patriotic War; Order of the Red Banner of Labour

Pyotr Georgiyevich Moskatov (Russian: Пётр Гео́ргиевич Моска́тов; 3 June 1894 – 19 April 1969) was a Soviet union leader and statesman, a deputy of the Supreme Soviet of the Soviet Union of the 1st and 2nd convocations.

== Life ==
Moskatov was born on 3 June 1894 in Taganrog in a working-class family. After graduating from a four–grade school, he entered as an apprentice to a metalworker. From 1907 to 1913, a worker at the factories of Taganrog. Took part in the strike and in 1913, he was administratively exiled outside the region of the Don Cossacks. He worked in Donbass, Makeevka, Yuzovka, Rostov–on–Don. In 1915, he was drafted into the army, a driver (Austrian Front). In February 1917, he was elected Chairman of the Regimental Committee.

== Career ==
After a concussion and gas poisoning, he was treated in Rostov–on–Don, then entered the Taganrog Metallurgical Plant and there in May 1917, he joined the Russian Social Democratic Labor Party (Bolsheviks). Since September 1917 – a member of the Taganrog City Party Committee. In 1918, in political work in the Red Army. When the Germans approached Taganrog, he retreated to the North Caucasus together with the Taganrog Regiment, which then joined the Taman Army, and worked as an armored vehicle driver. In 1919, he carried out important tasks of the party to organize underground work in the territory occupied by the White Guards (Rostov–on–Don – Taganrog). He was awarded the Order of the Red Banner.

From December 1919 – director of the Taganrog City Power Plant, from 1921 – the Russian–Baltic Plant. In December 1922, he was appointed Head of the Organizational Department of the Taganrog District Committee of the Russian Communist Party (Bolsheviks). Since September 1929 – Secretary of the Taganrog District Party Committee.

In September 1926, Moskatov was transferred to professional union work and was appointed Chairman of the North Caucasian Regional Committee of the Union of Metalworkers. Since 1929 – Secretary of the Central Committee of the Trade Union of Metal Workers, and since 1931 – Chairman of the Central Committee of the Trade Union of Transport Engineering. In 1934–1939, he was a member of the Party Control Commission Under the Central Committee of the All–Union Communist Party (Bolsheviks). In 1936, Pyotr Moskatov was appointed an authorized representative of the Party Control Commission for Kazakhstan, and then transferred to the same position in the Far Eastern Territory. Since May 1937 – Secretary of the All–Union Central Council of Trade Unions. Since December 1937 – Deputy of the Supreme Soviet of the Soviet Union.

Since October 1940 – Head of the Main Directorate of Labor Reserves under the Council of People's Commissars of the Soviet Union. During the Great Patriotic War, he carried out important tasks of the State Defense Committee for the training of young workers for industry and transport, for which he was awarded two Orders of Lenin, the Order of the Patriotic War of the 1st Degree, the Order of the Red Banner of Labor.

In 1946–1952 – 1st Deputy Minister of Labor Reserves of the Soviet Union. In 1939–1961, he was a member, and in 1952–1959, he was Chairman of the Central Auditing Commission of the Communist Party of the Soviet Union. At the same time, in 1954–1960, he was Chairman of the Commission for the Establishment of Personal Pensions under the Council of Ministers of the Soviet Union.

He retired in 1960 and died on 19 April 1969 in Kerch.

== Author ==
Pyotr Moskatov is the author of several books: "The Don's Working Class in the Struggle for Soviet Power" (1957), "Shoulder to Shoulder" (1955), "Conquered by October" (1957), "Together with the Party" (1958).

== Awards ==
- Order of Lenin (three times, including 1 July 1944);
- Order of the Red Banner;
- Order of the Patriotic War, 1st Degree;
- Order of the Red Banner of Labour;
- Medals.

== Remembrance ==
- A street in Taganrog is named after him.

== Sources ==
- For the Fighting Pace. 19 January 1948
