= 14th Congress of the All-Union Communist Party (Bolsheviks) =

1925 meeting of Soviet delegates

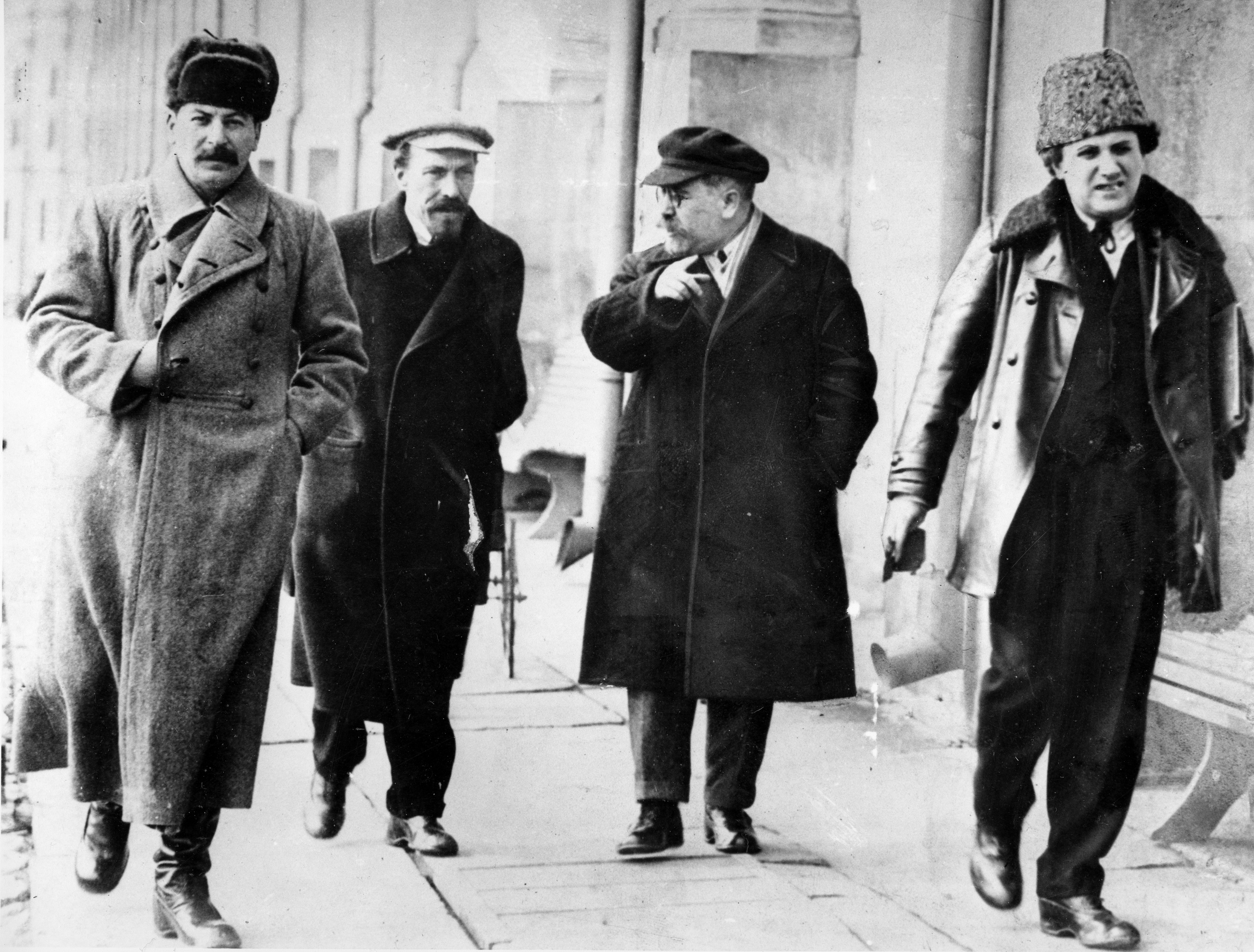
Soviet Communist Party leaders Joseph Stalin, Alexei Rykov, Lev Kamenev, and Grigory Zinoviev in 1925.

The 14th Congress of the All-Union Communist Party (Bolsheviks) was held during 18–31 December 1925 in Moscow. The congress elected the 14th Central Committee. The congress is best remembered for its declaration of intent to pursue rapid industrialisation of the Soviet Union rather than seeking lasting accommodation as an agricultural producer within the international system of capitalist world economy. It also marked the victory of the majority faction of Joseph Stalin and Nikolai Bukharin over the "New Opposition" headed by Grigory Zinoviev and Lev Kamenev.

== History ==
=== Opening ===
The 14th Congress of the All-Union Communist Party (Bolsheviks) was convened in the Andreevskii hall of the large Kremlin palace on 18 December 1925. A total of 665 delegates with decisive votes and 641 delegates with advisory voice were in attendance, representing the 643,000 members and 445,000 candidate members of the Soviet Communist Party. The congress had been preceded by factional skirmishing between the Central Committee majority group, headed by Joseph Stalin and Nikolai Bukharin and a Leningrad-based "New Opposition," headed by Comintern chief Grigory Zinoviev; the atmosphere was tense.

The congress opened with brief introductory remarks by Alexei Rykov, chair of the Soviet of People's Commissars of the Soviet Union (Sovnarkom). Following a brief floor squabble over the composition of the honorary Presidium of the convention, the congress's main address, the Political Report of the Central Committee, was delivered by Joseph Stalin, General Secretary of the Communist Party.

=== Political Report of the Central Committee ===
Stalin's political report dealt first with the international situation facing the Soviet Union, noting that "what seemed at first as if it were only to be a short breathing space after the war" had developed into an "equilibrium of forces" between the capitalist West and the Soviet regime — "a period of 'peaceful cohabitation' [мирное сожительство] between the bourgeois world and the proletarian world." Stalin then attempted to account for the "weakness of the capitalist world," attributing this to five types of internal division which disunited the capitalist camp.

"Contradictions" had emerged, Stalin declared, between the proletariat and the bourgeoisie within each country; between the imperialist capitalist nations and their colonial dependents; between the victorious and losing countries in the recently finished Imperialist War; between the victorious states themselves; and between the capitalist countries and the USSR.

These "contradictions" that made possible the ongoing state of "peaceful cohabitation" were aided, in Stalin's view, by the fact that world creditor nation the United States of America eagerly sought to avoid any further disruptive European conflict that might affect repayments of outstanding international debt. Additionally, Stalin noted, the capacity of international capitalism for conquest was further weakened by the loss of the "very extensive markets and enormous supplies of raw materials" represented by the withdrawal of the Soviet Union from the international marketplace.

In the second part of his political report, Stalin dealt with the internal situation of the Soviet Union. He highlighted two views of the Soviet economy going forward: the first, advocated by economist Lev Shanin, postulated that Russia would remain an agrarian country for the foreseeable future and thus would need peaceful reintegration into the network of international trade; the second, observing "so long as we are surrounded by capitalist states, we must devote all our energies to making our country remain an independent entity based upon the home market."

Stalin argued forcefully for the second of these plans, declaring:

"We must see to it that our country shall be a centre of attraction for all those countries which, by degrees, will fall away from capitalism, and will enter the path of socialist economy. That line of development can only be followed if we develop our industries to the utmost, in a manner appropriate to the resources at our disposal. We emphatically reject the policy of transforming our country into an appendage of the capitalist world system. We advocate the path of socialist construction. That is, and will remain, the party aim."

Stalin enumerated five economic forms of the Soviet economy: (1) simple peasant production for use; (2) peasant production for the market; (3) private capitalism, inevitable "as long as the New Economic Policy remains in force; (4) state capitalism, state production for the market; and (5) socialist industry, in which production "is not carried on in order to make profits for a class alien to the workers, but in order to expand the industry for the general advantage of the working class as a whole.

The table was thus set for the further pursuit of the goal of Socialism in One Country and the policy of breakneck industrialisation as exemplified by the Five Year Plans. The 14th Congress was remembered by one official party historian as a veritable clarion call:

"The slogan of industrialisation in view of the lack of large foreign credits, naturally demanded the straining of all the country's economic forces and involved the surmounting of serious difficulties. But the path of industrialisation was at the same time the sole path which would protect our country from becoming a colony for foreign capital, a plaything of international imperialism, which would make it an inevitable base and fortress of the international revolution and would ensure that the work of socialist construction was carried to completion."

In the third and final portion of his lengthy report, Stalin dealt with the internal situation in the Communist Party, which Stalin cast as the guiding force of the dictatorship of the proletariat and its Soviet state. "But for the guidance of the party, the proletarian dictatorship could not possibly continue in existing circumstances, when we are encompassed by hostile capitalist powers," Stalin noted, adding "any weakening of the party will inevitably and promptly result in a weakening of the proletarian dictatorship."

Stalin depicted the Communist Party as growing in size and influence and united around its current leadership. He hailed the defeat of Leon Trotsky and his co-thinkers during the previous year and how "resolutely the party met these moves, which were really of a hostile character" but postponed for later a frontal attack on the Leningrad "New Opposition" organized around Grigory Zinoviev and Lev Kamenev.

=== Faction fighting erupts ===
Stalin's keynote address was followed by the report of his closest associate, V.M. Molotov, who delivered the report on organizational questions. Molotov seems to have delivered a measured and generalized speech in which he poked at factional rival Grigory Zinoviev by noting the ongoing need for "immense work in the struggle with deviations from Leninism."

On the second day, Zinoviev delivered a report of his own, taking a dig at chief theoretician of the Stalin faction Nikolai Bukharin and his controversial slogan advanced to motivate the peasantry to resume production under the NEP — "Enrich yourselves." Zinoviev was heard politely, with no serious heckling by adherents of the Stalin-Bukharin faction, although the applause which met the conclusion of his speech seems to have been largely limited to the Leningrad delegation, the nexus of his factional strength.

Bukharin responded to Zinoviev with a rejoinder, in which he thanked Zinoviev for foregoing "the shrill tone which we hear daily from the pages of Leningradskaya Pravda", but hitting him for having set himself against the Central Committee majority and for offering no concrete alternative proposals. Bukharin made note that the slogan "Enrich yourselves" had been long since retracted, and hinted that no similar self-criticism by Zinoviev over his direct appeal to Trotsky at the previous convention was forthcoming.

Lenin's widow, Nadezhda Krupskaya, a supporter of the Zinoviev-Kamenev faction, next took to the floor to answer Bukharin. She was sharply critical of the way open debate had been stifled in the pages of Pravda prior to the congress and defended Zinoviev's right to express contrarian opinions.

Standards of civil discourse deteriorated during the third day of the congress. Speaking for the New Opposition, M. Lashevich was met with a barrage of jeers and catcalls, which interrupted his presentation. Lashevich charged that Zinoviev and Kamenev were being "cut off" from decision-making authority. This was emphatically denied by Anastas Mikoyan of the majority faction, who was followed by Nikolai Uglanov, head of the Moscow party organization, who took a bite out of his predecessor in that role, Lev Kamenev. The rout of the Leningrad faction was on.

Lev Kamenev delivered a long and effective speech on 21 December, first taking down hecklers with cutting comments from the lectern before launching into an attack on Stalin's earlier moderate tone towards the rich peasantry and characterization of the industrialisation-oriented Left Opposition as the greater threat to stability of the Soviet state.

Kamenev attacked Stalin and his growing leadership role directly during the course of his five-hour speech:

"We are against creating the theory of a 'leader'; we are against making a leader. We are against having the [Stalin-led] secretariat combine in practice both politics and organization and place itself above the political organ.... We cannot regard it as normal, and we think it harmful to the party, to prolong a situation in which the secretariat...in fact decides policy in advance.... I repeat...to the congress: I have reached the conviction that Comrade Stalin cannot perform the function of uniting the Bolshevik general staff."

British historian E. H. Carr emphasized the importance of Kamenev's powerful declaration:

"Kamenev's bombshell changed the face of the congress. He had blurted out what some, perhaps many, had thought, but nobody hitherto had dared to say. But he had also exposed the opposition to a fresh charge, made by nearly every subsequent official speaker in the debate: Kamenev had unmasked the real motive of the opposition platform — personal jealousy and animosity against Stalin — and revealed the hollowness of the alleged arguments of principle on which it was supported."

=== Reports ===
- Political report of the Central Committee (Stalin)
- Organisational report of the Central Committee (Molotov)
- Report of the Central Revision Committee (Kursky)
- Report of the Central Control Committee (Kuybyshev)
- Report of the Representation of the Russian Communist Party at the Executive Committee of the International (Zinoviev)
- Issues related to the economic edification (Kamenev)
- On the activity of the trade unions (Tomsky)
- On the activity of the Komsomol (Bukharin)
- On some changes of the Party Statutes (Andreyev)
- Elections to the Central Institutions of the Party
