= Explosion in Leontievsky Lane =

1919 anarchist terrorist attack

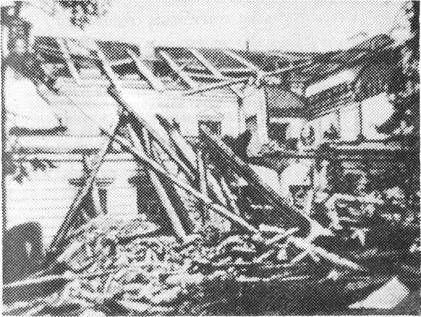
- Explosion results in Leontievsky Lane. The house was restored in 1922 by the architect Vladimir Mayat. Nowadays, the building houses the Embassy of Ukraine.
- Location: 55°45′38.81″N 37°36′22.93″E; Tverskoy District, Moscow, Russia
- Date: 25 September 1919
- Target: Place of mass gathering of people in the premises of the Moscow Committee of the Russian Communist Party (Bolsheviks), Leontievsky Lane, 18
- Attack type: Explosion of a bomb in a place of mass gathering of people
- Weapon: Explosive device
- Deaths: 12
- Injuries: 55
- Perpetrators: 4 (Kazimir Kovalevich, All–Russian Insurgent Committee of Revolutionary Partisans)
- Assailant: Bomber Pyotr Sobolev
- Motive: Anarchism

The Explosion in Leontievsky Lane was a terrorist act committed on 25 September 1919 by a group of anarchists with the aim of destroying the leadership of the Moscow Committee of the Russian Communist Party (Bolsheviks). As a result of the explosion of a bomb thrown by the terrorist Sobolev, 12 people were killed, another 55 were injured.

== Terrorist act ==
On 25 September 1919, in the premises of the Moscow Committee of the Russian Communist Party (Bolsheviks), located in Leontievsky Lane, a meeting was held on the organization of agitation and the development of a work plan in party schools. Among those present were responsible party workers in Moscow, district delegates, agitators and lecturers, about 100–120 people in total. They were all cramped in a small room. The first to read their reports were a member of the Central Committee of the party Nikolai Bukharin, as well as the famous Bolsheviks Mikhail Pokrovsky and Yevgeny Preobrazhensky, the meeting began to analyze the plan for organizing party schools submitted for consideration. At this time, part of the audience began to disperse. The Chairman of the Meeting, Alexander Myasnikov, suggested that those wishing to leave as soon as possible to vacate the premises, as the noise interfered with the meeting. At that very moment, approximately from the side of the penultimate row, near the window into the garden, a loud crack was heard. Those present in the room at the same time ran to the doors, where congestion instantly formed.

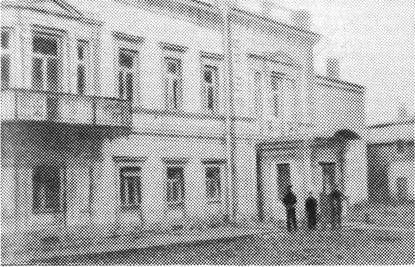
Building of the Moscow Committee of the Russian Communist Party (Bolsheviks) before the explosion, the house of Count Alexey Uvarov – mid–18th century; first third of the 19th century, architects Konstantin Bykovsky, Sergei Solovyov

As eyewitnesses later claimed, the secretary of the Moscow Committee of the Russian Communist Party (Bolsheviks) Vladimir Zagorsky jumped out from the presidium table, rushed to the side of the bomb that had fallen on the floor, shouting as he walked: "Calm down, nothing special, we will now find out what is the matter". Perhaps this brought peace to the crowd of delegates, and that is why a significant part of them managed to leave the premises before the explosion. Shortly after the bomb fell to the floor, it detonated. As it was later established, the criminals fled through the gate in the direction of Chernyshevsky Lane.

== Consequences of a terrorist attack ==
As a result of the explosion, the house was badly damaged, especially its back. The façade and the main staircase suffered relatively little damage. All the windows were smashed in front, frames and doors were torn in places. In the floor of the room, a bomb struck a large hole about three meters in diameter. The force of the explosion was such that two thick beams were broken in the floor. The entire rear of the building collapsed into the garden, and the iron roof that had been demolished by the explosion fell there.

The clearing of the rubble and the removal of the dead and wounded began about fifteen minutes after the explosion. The work lasted all night. Most of the killed and seriously wounded were in the middle and rear rows; those who were sitting in the front rows and on the podium received bruises and contusions. Almost all of the participants in the plenum of the Moscow Soviet arrived at the scene of the explosion.

The bodies of the nine victims of the explosion were transferred in zinc coffins to the House of Unions. On 28 September 1919, mass rallies were held, at which workers and military personnel carried posters with the slogans:

- «Your martyrdom is a call for reprisals against counter–revolutionaries!»;
- «We accept your challenge, long live the merciless Red Terror!»;
- «Burlak soul mourns your death, burlak hearts will not forgive murderers!»;
- «Let's not cry for the killed, we will close our ranks closer!»;
- «You were killed from around the corner, we will win openly!».

On the same day, the dead were buried in a mass grave near the Kremlin Wall. Speeches dedicated to their memory were made by Kamenev, Trotsky, Kalinin and Zinoviev.

=== Victims ===
A total of 12 people died as a result of the terrorist attack:

1. Maria Volkova, an employee of the Provincial Committee of the Russian Communist Party (Bolsheviks) (died on 29 September 1919, in the hospital);
2. Irina Ignatova, a worker of the Khamovnichesky District Committee of the Russian Communist Party (Bolsheviks);
3. Vladimir Zagorsky, Secretary of the Moscow Committee of the Russian Communist Party (Bolsheviks);
4. Anfisa Nikolaeva, Secretary of the Railway District Committee of the Russian Communist Party (Bolsheviks);
5. Georgy Razoryonov–Nikitin, Agitator of the Alekseev–Rostokinsky District Committee of the Russian Communist Party (Bolsheviks);
6. Grigory Titov, Agitator;
7. Anna Khaldina, an employee of the Moscow Committee of the Russian Communist Party (Bolsheviks);
8. Nikolay Kropotov, Member of the Moscow Council;
9. Alexander Safonov, member of the Revolutionary Military Council of the Eastern Front;
10. Abram Kvash;
11. Solomon Tankus, a student of the Central Party School;
12. Kolbin, a student of the Central Party School.

Among the 55 wounded were Nikolai Bukharin, who was wounded in the arm during the explosion, and Arvid Pelshe, a future member of the Political Bureau of the Central Committee of the Communist Party of the Soviet Union.

== Investigation of a terrorist attack ==
On 25 September 1919, the newspaper Anarchia published a statement in which the anarchist group, the All–Russian Insurgent Committee of Revolutionary Partisans, claimed responsibility for the terrorist act. The Moscow Extraordinary Commission undertook to investigate the terrorist act. The organizer of the terrorist act Kazimir Kovalevich and the bomber Pyotr Sobolev were killed during the arrest, as they were desperately shooting back and throwing bombs. Seven more anarchists committed suicide bombing of the dacha at Kraskovo station when they realized that they were surrounded by extraordinary commissioners. Another, a certain Baranovsky, survived and was arrested. Eight participants in the preparation of the terrorist act – Grechanikov, Tsintsiper, Dombrovsky, Voskhodov, Nikolaev, Isaev, Khlebnysky and the already mentioned Baranovsky – were shot by order of the Moscow Extraordinary Commission.

== In literature ==
- Mark Aldanov in 1936 published an essay "Explosion in Leontievsky Lane", where he connected the "anarchists of the underground" with the Makhnovists;
- Vladislav Khodasevich dedicated an essay of the same name to Cherepanov, one of the leaders of the left–wing Socialist Revolutionaries who, in collaboration with the anarchists, prepared the explosion;
- The story of Theodor Gladkov "Explosion at Leontievsky";
- Andrey Solovyov. "Explosion at Leontievsky". From the book "Wolves Dying in Traps". Moscow. "Military Publishing House of the Ministry of Defense of the Soviet Union." 1976.

== In the cinema ==
- The film "About Friends and Comrades".

== Gallery ==
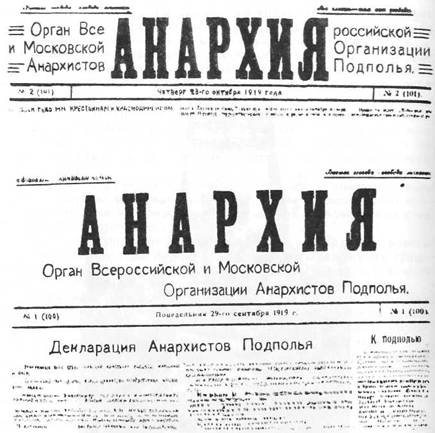
The editorial of the newspaper "Anarchy" with the declaration of the anarchists

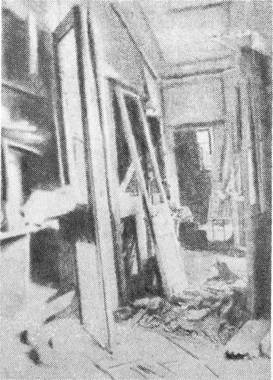
The doors ripped off as a result of the explosion

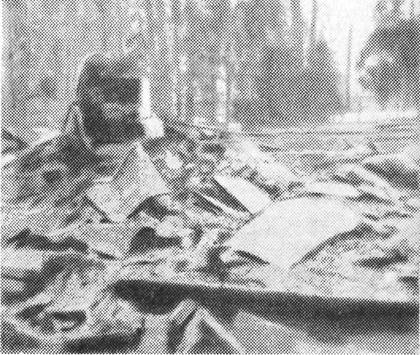
Blown up summer house in Kraskovo

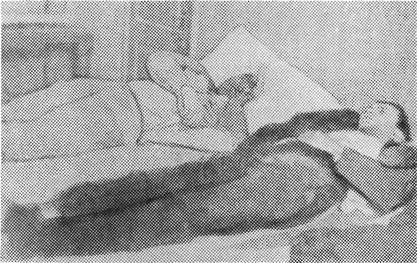
The bodies of Kvasha (above) and Kropotov (below)

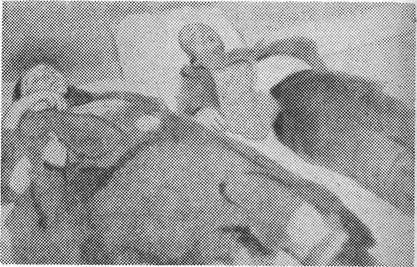
The bodies of Nikolaeva (left) and Safonov (right)

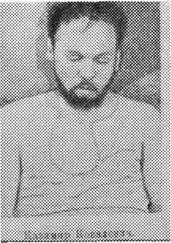
Dead Kazimir Kovalevich

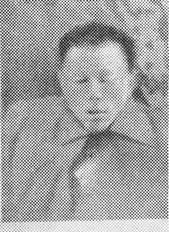
Dead Peter Sobolev

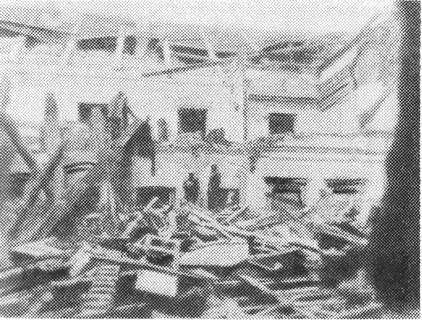
Firefighters work at the scene of the explosion

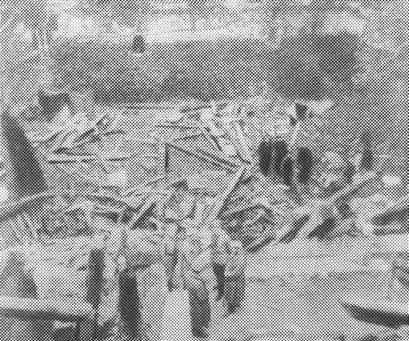
Clearing debris at the explosion site

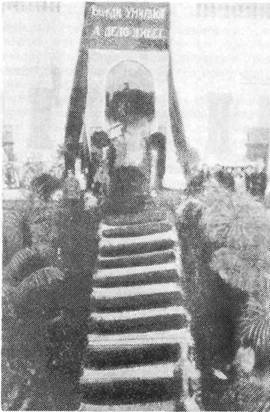
Coffins in the Column Hall of the House of Unions

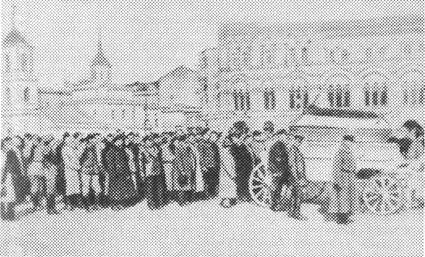
The funeral of the victims

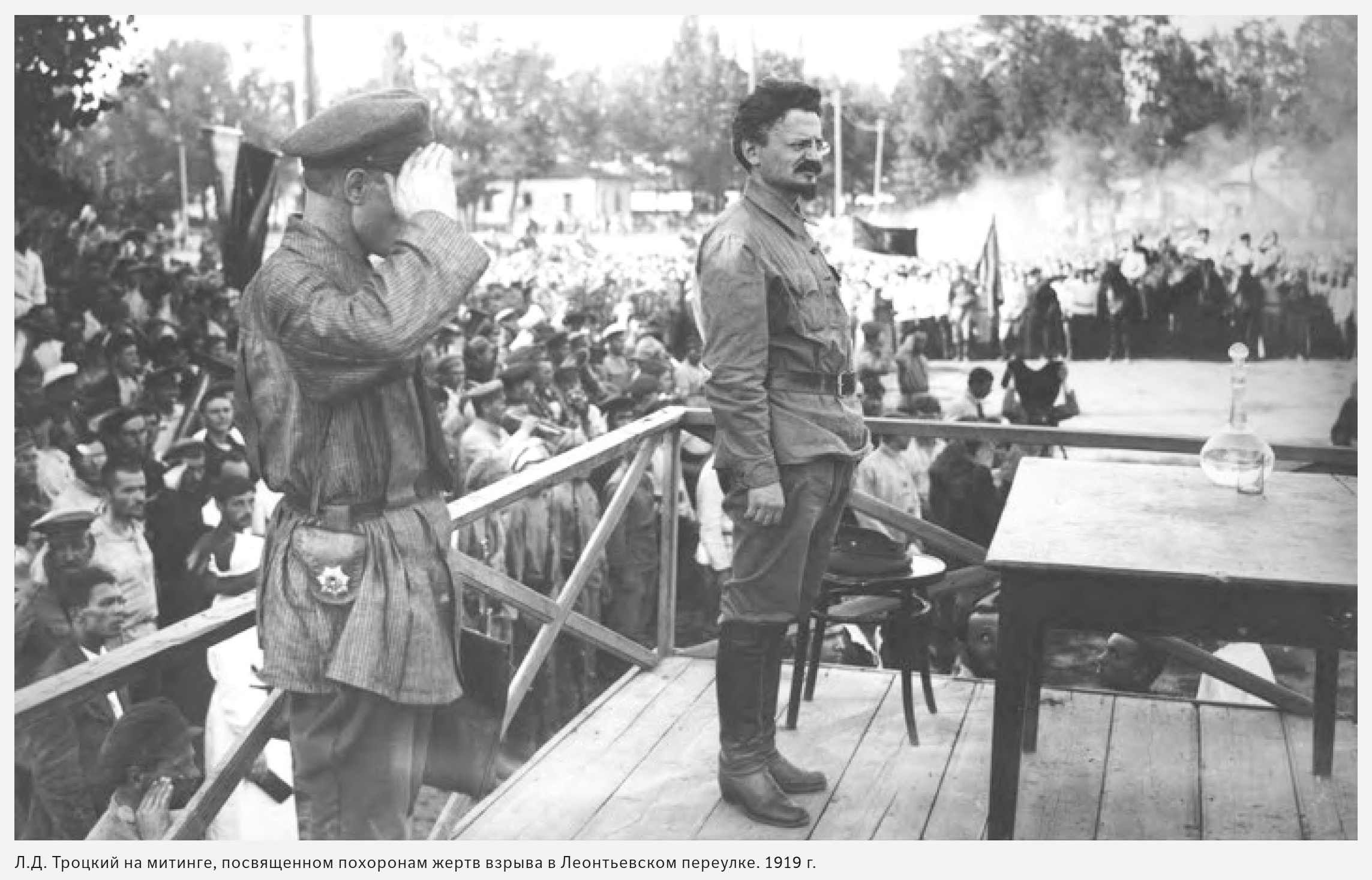
Leon Trotsky at a rally dedicated to the burial of the victims of the explosion
