= Der komunistisher veg =

- Editor: M. Kiper
- Founded: 1920
- Political alignment: Communist
- Language: Yiddish language
- Headquarters: Gomel
- Circulation: 2,000

Der komunistisher veg (Yiddish: דער קאמוניסטישער וועג, 'The Communist Path') was a Yiddish-language newspaper published from the Soviet city of Gomel, founded in 1920. It was a weekly paper. Der komunistisher veg was the organ of the Gomel Governorate Bureau of the Jewish Section of the Communist Party and the Gomel Governorate Committee. M. Kiper was the editor of the newspaper.

Published in the midst of the Russian Civil War, times of great scarcity of printing paper, Der komunistisher veg was printed on grey wrapping paper. Between the 9th (April 1920) and 10th (March 1921) congresses of the Russian Communist Party (bolsheviks), 182 issues of Der komunistisher veg were published. It had a circulation of around 2,000.
