= Central Bureau of the German Sections of the Russian Communist Party (Bolsheviks) =

German Bolshevik organization in Russia

The Central Bureau of the German Sections of the Central Committee of the Russian Communist Party (Bolsheviks) (German: Zentralbüro der deutschen Sektionen beim Zentralkomitee der Kommunistischen Partei Rußlands (Bolschewiki)) was a structure within the organization of the Bolshevik Party, coordinating the activities of ethnic German sections of the party.

== Founding of the Central Bureau of the German Sections ==
By the end of 1918 German communist groups had been formed in Astrakhan, Tsaritsyn, Irkutsk, Ekaterinburg, Kazan, Nizhny Novgorod, Omsk, Penza, Perm, Petrograd, Samara, Saratov, Tomsk, Tula, Tver, Tashkent and Vyatka – linked to the respective city party organizations of the Russian Communist Party (Bolsheviks). The Central Bureau of the German Sections of the Russian Communist Party (Bolsheviks) was established in Moscow on February 26, 1920, in order to gather all the German communist groups in Soviet Russia into a united organization. The Central Bureau of German Sections was subordinated to the Central Committee of the Russian Communist Party (Bolsheviks). Friedrich Schäfer was the First Secretary of the Central Bureau.

The main slogan of the Central Bureau was "To the Red Army!", promoting participation of German communists in the frontlines of the Russian Civil War. The Central Bureau also sought to involve German prisoners of war in the rebuilding of the national economy of Soviet Russia. The Central Bureau took over the management of the publication Rote Fahne ('Red Banner'), which had begun publishing in August 1919. In Moscow, German communists merged into a single organization – which would have 84 members by the summer. In March 1920 a German communist section was set up in Perm, which would become one of the most important German communist groups across Soviet Russia. Both the Moscow and Perm groups sought to agitate among German prisoners of war and send communist organizers to Germany and Austria.

The 1920 Ruhr uprising prompted the Central Bureau to begin sending communists cadres into Germany, to help build the revolutionary movement there. Between March and August 1920, some 85 members of the RCP(b) German Sections were sent from Moscow to Germany.

== Growth of the organization ==
By mid-1920 the Central Bureau oversaw 73 German communist sections, including 9 groups in the international units of the Red Army. All in all, there were some 2,850 German full party members and 720 candidate party members. There were 14 German communist sections in the central governorates of Soviet Russia, consisting of 450 full party members and 120 candidate party members. In Siberia there were 17 German communist sections, with some 1,500 members by August 1920. In July 1920 a party school managed by the Central Bureau was established in Moscow, at which more than twenty people studied.

=== In Turkestan ===
In the Turkestan Autonomous Soviet Socialist Republic there were 4 German communist sections, with a total of 375 full party members and 9 candidate party members. A few hundred German and Austrian communists were enrolled in the Red Army in Turkestan – in the First Ferghana International Cavalry Brigade, on the Transcaspian and Ashgabat fronts and in the Kushka District. Per decisions of the Regional Committee of the Communist Party of Germany and the Central Bureau of German Sections of the RCP(b), the First Regional Conference of German Communists was organized in Tashkent in June 1920.

=== Publishing activities ===
In addition to the Moscow-based publication Rote Fahne, the German sections published newspapers and journals across Soviet Russia. Dritte Internationale ('Third International') was published from Kazan. In Omsk, the publication Weltrevolution ('World Revolution') was printed in some 6,000 copies. In Tashkent there was the weekly newspaper Rote Fahne (initially named Völkerfreiheit, established on August 5, 1918, and which from March 1920 became the party organ of the German communists in Turkestan) and the journal Dritte Internationale. In Tomsk Neue Zeit ('New Times') first appeared on April 3, 1920. Further German-language publications were issued from Novonikolaevsk, Krasnoyarsk, Semipalatinsk, Barnaul, Irkutsk and Verkhneudinsk.

== First All-Russian Conference of German Sections ==
Per a decision of the Politburo of the Central Committee of the RCP (b) on April 19, 1920, the First All-Russian Conference of German Sections was held in Moscow on August 16–21, 1920. The local German sections with more than 50 members could send a delegate to the conference, in total 36 delegates with voting rights took part. Representatives from the Communist International and the Communist Party of Germany attended the event. The conference decided that German and Austrian communists wishing to return to their home countries would be allowed to do so. A procedure for integration of returning members of RCP(b) German Sections to the Communist Party of Germany was established.

At the conference Wilhelm Kurz was elected as the secretary of the Central Bureau of the German Sections of RCP(b). Rudolf Hurka became his deputy, Popper became the head of the Publishing Department of the Central Bureau. Apart from Schäfer, all leaders of the Central Bureau had to relocate to Moscow from other cities.

Considering the changes in the political-military context, the slogan "To the Red Army!" was replaced by "To the Work Places!". The Moscow conference outlined two key tasks for the German Sections of RCP(b) – political mobilization among German prisoners of war and organizing the German peasants in Russia.

== November 1920 reorganization ==
In November 1920 the Orgburo of the Central Committee of the RCP(b) decided to reorganized the Central Bureau into the Central Bureau of the German Sections for Agitation and Propaganda. Local German communist sections were reassigned as subdivisions of their corresponding Governorate or Regional-level Committees for National Minorities of the party. A Regional Bureau for the German Sections for Agitation and Propaganda for Siberia and the Ural Region was established in Omsk, supervising 30 local sections.

== Later publishing activities ==
In Omsk and Novosibirsk, the German Section for Agitation and Propaganda of the Siberian Regional Bureau of the Central Committee of the RCP(b) issued the publication Der Dorfrat ('Village Council') 1920–1921.

Rote Fahne, which had been published intermittently, ceased publication in 1922. On December 1, 1922, the Moscow twice-monthly publication Die Arbeit ('Labour') became the new organ of the Central Bureau. Die Arbeit ceased publication April 12, 1922. In January 1926, the Central Bureau began publishing the weekly Unsere Bauernzeitung ('Our Peasant Newspaper'). Sixteen issues were published January–May 1926, until it was converted into the Deutsche Zentral-Zeitung ('German Central Newspaper'). Unsere Bauernzeitung/Deutsche Zentral-Zeitung was initially edited by J. Petzina, then (from November 6, 1923) by Bernhard Bartels and from May 1, 1926, by Georg Luft. When the Central Bureau of German Sections was dissolved, publishing of Deutsche Zentral-Zeitung was taken over by the German Section of the Communist International.

== See also ==
- Central Bureau of the Jewish Sections of the Central Committee of the Russian Communist Party (Bolsheviks)
- Central Bureau of the Lithuanian Sections of the Central Committee of the Russian Communist Party (Bolsheviks)
