= Profbavegung =

- Political alignment: Minsk Council of Trade Unions
- Language: Yiddish
- Headquarters: Minsk
- Country: Soviet Byeloruss
- Circulation: 2000

Profbavegung (Yiddish: פראפבאוועגונג, 'Trade Union Movement') was a Yiddish language newspaper published from Minsk. It was an organ of the Minsk Council of Trade Unions. Between the 9th (April 1920) and 10th (March 1921) Party Congresses, 37 issues of Profbavegung were published. It had a circulation of around 2,000. Bunin and Vulf Nodel served as editors of Profbavegung. Both of them were formed Bundists that had become prominent leaders of the Minsk Bureau of the Jewish Sections of the Communist Party.
