= Donat Cherepanov =

Russian anarchist

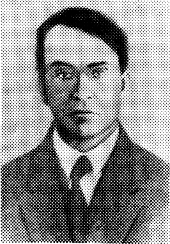
- Born: 1886
- Disappeared: March 1920; Moscow
- Died: Unknown
- Years active: 1917–1920
- Political party: Left Socialist Revolutionary Party (1917–1919)
- Other political affiliations: Socialist Revolutionary Party (1917)

Donat Andreevich Cherepanov (1886; disappeared March 1920) was a Russian revolutionary. He joined the Socialist-Revolutionaries around the time of the Russian revolutions of 1917, and emerged as a leading dissident in the Left-Socialist Revolutionary movement. He is believed to have died in captivity after being arrested in 1920.

== Biography ==
Donat Andreevich Cherepanov was the son of an unsuccessful Moscow entrepreneur. According an account by his former 3rd Moscow Gymnasium classmate V.F. Khodasevich, Cherepanov did not appear to be involved in politics as of late 1916. He became politically active in 1917, joining the Socialist Revolutionary Party, and later the same year siding with the Left Socialist-Revolutionaries in the party split. He gained some fame as a Left SR leader, along with such figures as Spiridonova and Kamkov.

Cherepanov became a member of the Central Committee of the Party of Left Socialist-Revolutionaries. He took a direct part in the Left SR uprising of July 1918. After the failure of the attempted insurrection, he went underground and became the leader of the so-called 'left-wing of Left SRs' who advocated an irreconcilable terrorist struggle against the Bolsheviks. His underground nickname was 'Cherepok'. He established contacts with a group of underground anarchists led by Kazimir Kovalevich, and together they organized an explosion in Leontyevsky Lane on 25 September 1919. Vladimir Zagorsky and 11 others were killed in this attack. Cherepanov was expelled from PLSR(i) in September 1919.

Cherepanov was arrested by the Moscow Cheka on 20 February 1920. Cherepanov was personally interrogated by the leaders of the Cheka, Feliks Dzerzhinsky and Ivan Ksenofontov. Cherepanov was thought to have been executed shortly after his capture, but it is possible he died of typhus.

== In media ==
- Grigory Ostrin portrayed Cherepanov in the 1968 film The Sixth of July.
