= The ABC of Communism =

Book by Nikolai Bukharin

- First edition cover
- Author: Nikolai Bukharin and Yevgeni Preobrazhensky
- Original title: Russian: Азбука коммунизма
- Language: Russian
- Publication date: 1920

The ABC of Communism (Russian: Азбука коммунизма, Azbuka Kommunizma) is a book written by Nikolai Bukharin and Yevgeni Preobrazhensky in 1920, during the Russian Civil War. Originally written to convince the proletariat of Russia to support the Bolsheviks, it became "an elementary textbook of communist knowledge". It became the best known and most widely circulated of all pre-Stalinist expositions of Bolshevism and the most widely read political work in Soviet Russia.

== Background ==
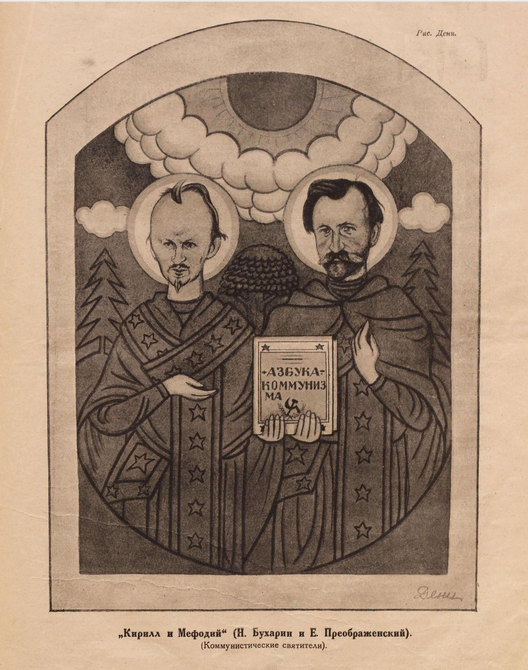
A cartoon by Viktor Deni published in Prozhektor (Searchlight) depicting Nikolai Bukharin and Yevgeni Preobrazhensky as Cyril and Methodius holding The ABC of Communism, 1923

In the October Revolution, part of the Russian Revolution, an armed insurrection occurred. It is traditionally dated to 25 October 1917 O.S. (7 November 1917 N.S.). It was the second phase of the overall Russian Revolution of 1917, after the February Revolution of the same year. The October Revolution overthrew the Russian Provisional Government and gave the power to the Soviets dominated by Bolsheviks. It was followed by the Russian Civil War (1917–1922) and the creation of the Soviet Union in 1922.

The revolution was led by the Bolsheviks. Bolshevik armed forces began the takeover of government buildings on 24 October; however 25 October O.S. was the date when the Winter Palace (the seat of the Provisional government located in Petrograd, the capital of Russia) was captured.

== Writing ==
The ABC of Communism was written during the civil war, and was written to convince the citizens of Russia. In keeping with the period in which it was written, its mood was that of war communism, a militant optimism. It was a statement of Utopian hopes, not Soviet reality.

== Organization ==
The work is divided into two parts, with the first titled: Theoretical - Growth and Decay of Capitalism, and the second titled: Practical - The Dictatorship of the Proletariat and the Upbuilding of Communism. The first part consists five chapters, dealing with the theoretical underpinnings of communism; with the second, dealing with how this theory would be put into practice.

== Association with Bukharin ==
Preobrazhensky's co-authorship eventually became "half-forgotten", and The ABC soon became inextricably associated with Bukharin, spreading his fame and giving rise to his reputation.

== International influence ==
The first English translation by Patrick Lavin was published by the Marxian Educational Society, of Detroit, Michigan in 1921. A second English translation by Cedar and Eden Paul was published by the Communist Party of Great Britain in 1922. Penguin Books republished the 1922 translation in 1969, with an introduction by historian E.H. Carr.

The ABC was translated into Chinese shortly after its publication. Deng Xiaoping stated that The ABC was instrumental in convincing him that the Marxist approach was correct.
