= 10th Congress of the Russian Communist Party (Bolsheviks) =

1921 conference held in Moscow

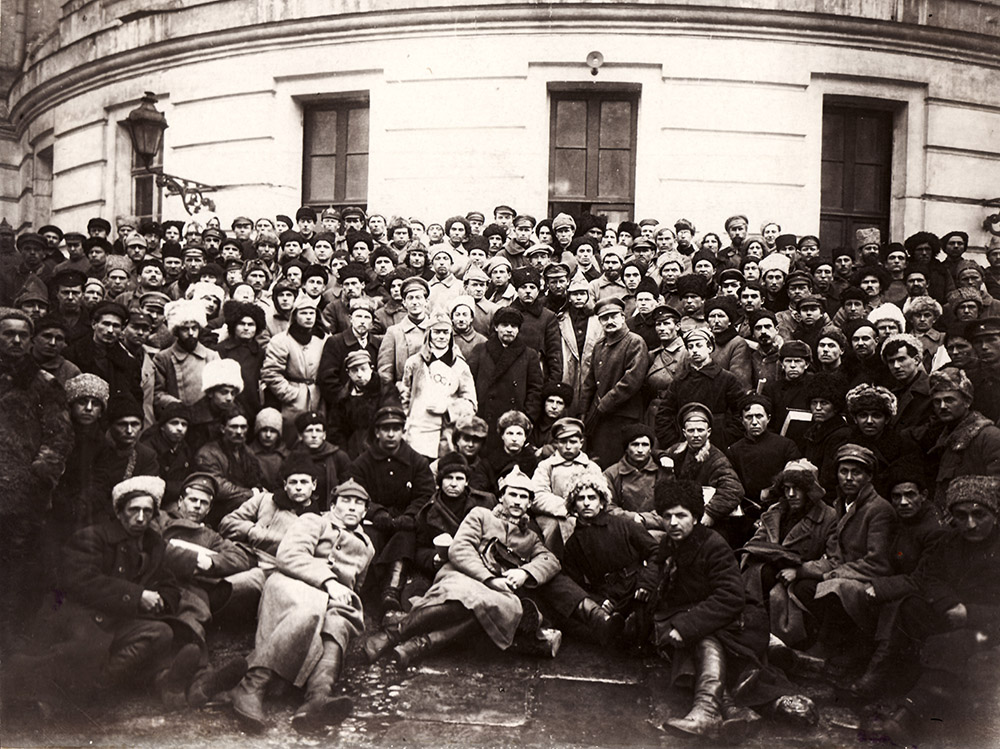
Lenin (center), Trotsky (center-right) and Voroshilov (behind Lenin) with Delegates of the 10th Congress of the Russian Communist Party

The 10th Congress of the Russian Communist Party (Bolsheviks) was held during March 8–16, 1921 in Moscow, Russia. The congress dealt with the issues of the party opposition, the New Economic Policy, and the Kronstadt rebellion, which started halfway through the Congress. The Congress was attended by 694 voting delegates and 296 non-voting delegates.

== Agenda ==
The Agenda consisted of:

1. Report of the Central Committee;
2. Report of the Control Commission;
3. The trade unions' economic role;
4. The Socialist Republic in a capitalist encirclement foreign trade, concessions, etc.;
5. Food supply, surplus-food appropriation, tax in kind and fuel crisis,
6. Problems of Party organisation;
7. The Party's current tasks in the nationalities question;
8. Reorganisation of the army and the militia question;
9. The Chief Administration for Political Education and the Party's propaganda and agitation work;
10. Report of the R.C.P.'s representative in the Comintern, and its current tasks;
11. Report of the R.C.P.'s representatives in the International Trade Union Council;
12. Elections to the Central Committee, the Control Commission and the Auditing Commission

== Major decisions ==
Major decisions made by delegates included:

- A ban on internal factions in the Russian Communist Party (Bolsheviks) (Resolution No. 12: "On Party Unity"). These factions included Workers' Opposition (who were accused of representing an anarcho-syndicalist deviation), and Democratic Centralists, who wanted more Soviet autonomy.
- The New Economic Policy was decided. Foreign trade, banks and heavy industry would stay in state hands, the rest was privatized.
- After Trotsky's closed session report on the difficulties quelling the Kronstadt rebellion, over a quarter of the delegates (300) volunteered for the cause, led by the opposition parties eager to prove their loyalty.

== Party unity ==
The congress intricately examined party unity and dissent during the meetings. The congress adopted resolution "On Party Unity," which effectively and immediately dissolved all party factions. Lenin also introduced “On the Syndicalist and Anarchist Deviation in our Party”, which the congress also adopted.

== Trade unions ==
The result of the debate on the trade unions was a rejection by the congress of the views of Trotsky, the 9th Secretariat, the Workers' Opposition and the Democratic Centralists. The resolution On the Role and Tasks of the Trade Unions, which incorporated Lenin's definition of the role of the trade unions as educational organizations and schools of administration, economic management, and communism, was adopted by a majority vote.

== New Economic Policy ==
The New Economic Policy (NEP) was cautiously introduced by Lenin in his general speech to the tenth party congress. Trotsky outlined the NEP to the congress in two speeches. Trotsky described war communism as "dictated not by economic, but by military needs, considerations and conditions," while also arguing that the notion that communism could be achieved through such means was absurd and reserved for "dreamers." The change to the NEP from war communism was designed "to alleviate [the peasant's] condition, to give more to the small farmer, and assure him of greater security in private farming." However, many of the economic changes came too late, as widespread famine and starvation took place throughout 1921.

== Resolutions ==
=== On Party Unity ===
The dissolution of all factions was ordered by the congress. The congress also gave the Central Committee the power to apply discipline against factional activity, including party expulsion.

=== On the Syndicalist and Anarchist Deviation in Our Party ===
The congress ordered a purge of the party to restore it to a "condition of soundness." The congress also resolved to "recognize the necessity for a determined and systematic struggle against" syndicalist and anarchist deviations and that these ideas were incompatible with those of the Russian Communist Party.

=== On the Control Commissions ===
Control Commissions were established to create and strengthen party unity by combatting careerism and bureaucratization.

=== On the Role and Tasks of Trade Unions ===
The congress established that the role of trade unions was to further the support for proletarian dictatorship, and to act as a school of communism.

=== On the Replacement of the Requisitions with a Tax in Kind ===
State requisitions and procurements of raw material, such as grain, were replaced with a monetary tax. The poorest peasants and farms would be exempt from the tax and those that exhibited increase in productivity under these new rules will be subject to advantages in the form of tax reduction.
