= Patrick Lavin =

English communist, activist, and translator

Patrick Peter Lavin (1881-unknown) was an English communist, activist, and translator. He started off as a miner, but as an autodidact he was attracted to Independent Working Class Education. Lavin was secretary of the Scottish Labour College. After membership of the Independent Labour Party and the Socialist Labour Party he became a founding member of the Communist Party of Great Britain at their Foundation Congress in 1920.

In October 1922 Lavin advocated that communists should support the Anti-Treaty Irish Republican Army in their struggle. In the article he wrote for the Workers' Republic he quoted Lenin's address to the 2nd World Congress of the Comintern: "Direct assistance must be given by all Communist Parties to the revolutionary movements of subject peoples (for example – Ireland)." This article was noted in the fortnightly police report to the British cabinet.

== Notes ==
- 1906 The Mass Strike, the Political Party and the Trade Unions by Rosa Luxemburg
- 1920 Proletarian Dictatorship and Terrorism by Karl Radek Detroit, MI: Marxian Educational Society, [1920]
- 1921 The ABC of Communism by Nikolai Bukharin and Yevgeni Preobrazhensky Detroit, MI: Marxian Educational Society, [1921].
