= Leonid Serebryakov =

Russian politician (1890–1937)

- Леонид Серебряков
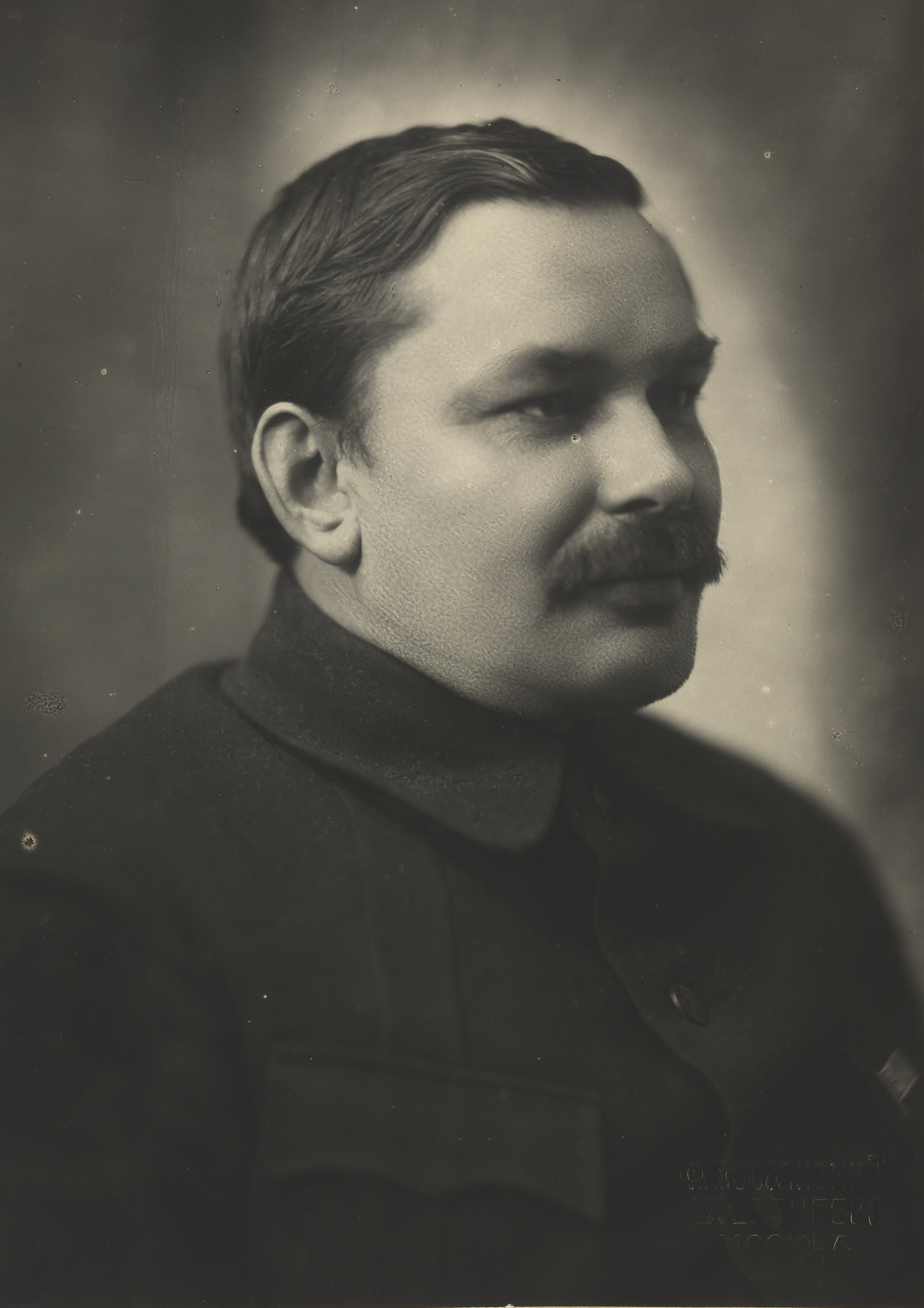
- Serebryakov in 1922

Member of the 10th Secretariat
- In office 5 April 1920 – 16 March 1921

Personal details
- Born: Leonid Petrovich Serebryakov; 11 June 1890 Samara, Russian Empire
- Died: 1 February 1937 (aged 46) Moscow, Russian SFSR, Soviet Union
- Party: RSDLP (Bolsheviks) (1905–1918); Russian Communist Party (1918–1927, 1930–1936)

Leonid Petrovich Serebryakov (Russian: Леони́д Петро́вич Серебряко́в; 11 June 1890 – 1 February 1937) was a Russian Soviet politician and Bolshevik who became a victim of the Great Purge.

== Early life ==
Born at Samara, the son of a metalworker, Serebryakov left school at 14 to operate a lathe in an engineering works in Lugansk. He joined the Bolsheviks at the age of 15 during the 1905 Revolution, was arrested several times in 1905 to 1907, and was dismissed from his job because of his revolutionary activities. In 1908, he was exiled for two years to Vologda province. In 1910 to 1911, after his release, he acted as an itinerant Bolshevik organiser/and was a delegate to the Prague Conference in January 1912, the first to exclude Mensheviks and anyone else who did not follow the line laid down by Vladimir Lenin, the leader of the Bolsheviks. Returning to Samara in 1912, he was arrested and sentenced to three years exile in Narym.

He escaped in 1913 and was sent by the party to Baku to organise a strike but had to leave because he was shadowed. He was arrested in Odessa and sent back to Narym. In 1914, he escaped again but was arrested in Moscow and returned to Narym. He was released from exile in 1916 but was drafted into the infantry for the war against Germany.

== Political career ==
When the February Revolution broke out, in 1917, Serebryakov led a mutiny in Kostroma, where he was stationed, and helped organise the Kostroma soviet. In mid-1917, he moved to Moscow, where he worked as a party organiser for the next four years. In 1919, he became a member of the Secretariat of the Central Committee of the Communist Party of the Soviet Union, together with Nikolai Krestinsky and Yevgeny Preobrazhensky. The three secretaries supported Leon Trotsky when he had a dispute with Lenin over the trade unions. At the Tenth Party Congress in March 1921, Lenin's faction won a decisive victory on the dispute, and Serebryakov and the other two secretaries of the Central Committee had to resign. He then worked with Joseph Stalin on the Military Council of the Southern Front during the Russian Civil War. In May 1922 to 1924, he was Deputy People's Commissar for Transport.

In 1923, he married Galina Krasutskaya, the teenage daughter of fellow Bolsheviks, and they had a daughter, Zorya. The marriage ended in 1925, when she married Grigori Sokolnikov, but she continued to use the name Serebryakova.

== Opposition to Stalin ==
In 1923, Serebryakov signed the Declaration of the 46, after which he supported Leon Trotsky. According to his daughter, Serebryakov looked up to Trotsky as a "great authority", who treated him with "not only respect, reverence, but also some kind of warmth and love, purely human." He was removed from his government post in 1924, and sent to Vienna, on a mission to negotiate a peace treaty between the Soviet Union and Romania. Victor Serge, who covered the talks as a journalist, described Serebryakov as "marked out by his moral authority, talents and past..., plump, vigorous in manner, fair-haired, with a full, round face and aggressive little moustache." After the talks collapsed, he was sent on a trade mission to the United States. Returning to Russia in 1926, he acted as go-between during the rapprochement between Trotsky and Grigory Zinoviev and their supporters. He was expelled from the Communist Party in August 1927, as one of a group who had been running an underground printing press, and was exiled to Semipalatinsk. He renounced his support for the Left Opposition in 1929, and his party membership was reinstated in January 1930.

== Arrest and execution ==
Serebryakov became head of the Central Administration of Highways and Automobile Transport administration in 1931, and first deputy head from August 1935. Unlike many former oppositionists, it seems that he avoided coming under any suspicion. Nevertheless, he was named during the first of the Moscow Trials in August 1936 as a member of the supposed Trotskyite Terrorist Centre and was arrested. His prosecutor, Andrey Vyshinsky, misappropriated his house and money.

Galina was also arrested and exiled. Their daughter, Zorya, then 14, was also arrested and later sent to join her mother in exile.

During the Trial of the Seventeen in January 1937, Serebryakov was accused of being accomplice in a murder attempt on Nikolai Yezhov and Lavrentiy Beria and of damaging attacks on Soviet railways in his capacity as head of Soviet railway transport even though he was the head of Soviet automobile, not railway, transport. He was sentenced to death after a forced confession by torture. He was shot on 1 February 1937.

For a long time, Galina blamed the activities of both her two ex-husbands, Serebryakov and Sokolnikov, for her arrest in 1937, and her years of exile and imprisonment. She discovered only after Stalin's death that they were both innocent.

Serebryakov was rehabilitated in December 1986.
