= Trade union debate =

1920–1921 Bolshevik political debate

The trade union debate was a political discussion that took place between late 1920 and the spring of 1921 within the Communist Party of the Soviet Union, concerning the role and function of trade unions in Soviet Russia. At a time when the Soviet government was transitioning from the extreme centralization of War Communism to a more mixed economic policy under the New Economic Policy (NEP), trade unions became the focus of an ideological struggle within the Party. The debate highlighted divergent views on whether trade unions should maintain autonomy from the state or be directly integrated into the apparatus of the state.

The result of the debate at the 10th Congress of the Russian Communist Party was a rejection of the positions put forward by Leon Trotsky, the Workers' Opposition, and the Democratic Centralists. The Congress passed the resolution On the Role and Tasks of the Trade Unions, which affirmed Vladimir Lenin's definition of trade unions as educational organizations, or "schools of communism" which take an intermediate position between the whole proletariat and its vanguard which occupies managerial positions in the Soviets and Party, thus making the trade unions a "reservoir" of the state power.

== Background ==
The trade union debate arose in the context of severe economic challenges following the Russian Civil War, particularly the collapse of industry and transportation systems. During the period of War Communism (1918–1921), the Soviet government had centralized economic control, with the state managing industry and production directly. This system of extreme centralization led to widespread shortages, inefficiencies, and discontent among workers.

By the end of 1920, it became clear that the War Communism model was unsustainable, and the Soviet leadership began considering a transition to a more mixed economic model. This shift culminated in the adoption of the New Economic Policy (NEP) in 1921, which reintroduced elements of market mechanisms and private trade. As part of this transition, there was a need to redefine the role of trade unions, which had played a critical part in the revolutionary struggle but now had to operate in a rapidly changing economic environment.

Different factions within the Party had contrasting views on the future of trade unions. The Workers' Opposition, led by Alexander Shlyapnikov and Alexandra Kollontai, advocated for greater independence of the trade unions from the state, arguing that they should control the economy and represent workers directly. Meanwhile, the Democratic Centralists called for more democratic participation in decision-making within the Party and the state but did not align fully with either Trotsky or the Workers' Opposition.

As the Soviet economy struggled to stabilize, the debate over trade unions became a battleground for larger ideological questions about the nature of workers' power in a socialist state and the relationship between workers, trade unions, and the state apparatus.

== Trotsky’s position ==
At the 9th Congress in March-April 1920, Trotsky had proposed replacing War Communism with the policy that would eventually become the New Economic Policy (NEP), but the proposal was rejected at the time in favour of Lenin's proposal of continuing on with War Communism. As War Communism continued on, Trotsky proposed that trade unions should be integrated directly into the state apparatus. As Commissar of War, Trotsky was focused on rebuilding the war-torn economy, particularly the transportation system. Trotsky believed that a militarized "production atmosphere" was necessary, where the state would manage both workers and the unions to achieve rapid economic recovery. Trotsky’s view was that the workers, in a socialist state, should have no reason to fear state control of the unions, as the state ostensibly represented their interests.

In a speech at the 10th Congress in March 1921, Trotsky argued for the "militarization of labor," declaring that workers should be treated as "soldiers of labor" and trade unions should become instruments of state control to enforce labor discipline. He stated:

"...a regime in which every worker feels himself a soldier of labour, who cannot dispose of himself freely; if the order is given to transfer him, he must carry it out; if he does not carry it out, he will be a deserter who is punished. Who looks after this? The trade unions. It creates the new regime. This is the militarisation of the working class."

Trotsky's position was sharply criticized by Lenin, who accused him of bureaucratic overreach.

== Lenin’s position ==
Lenin’s approach was more moderate than Trotsky’s and focused on the educational and organizational role of trade unions in the socialist state. He believed that trade unions should serve as a "school of communism," helping to educate workers in the administration of the economy and preparing them for eventual control of production. Rather than integrating the unions directly into the state apparatus, as Trotsky proposed, Lenin emphasized that the unions should retain a degree of autonomy to allow workers to have a voice and to prevent alienation from the state.

Lenin argued that the relationship between the state and the unions should be one of cooperation rather than coercion. He believed that genuine labor discipline could only be achieved if workers were engaged voluntarily, with trade unions acting as intermediaries between the workers and the state. This would foster a relationship based on trust and participation rather than the militaristic approach advocated by Trotsky.

Prominent figures such as Joseph Stalin and Grigory Zinoviev supported Lenin's view, and it was this position that ultimately won out at the 10th Congress of the Russian Communist Party. The resolution On the Role and Tasks of the Trade Unions enshrined Lenin’s definition of unions as schools of administration and communism, designed to guide workers into roles of economic management.

Nikolai Bukharin's position, and that of his Left Communist allies, was sharply criticized by Lenin for seeking to act as a "buffer" between the positions of Lenin and Trotsky on the trade union issue. Lenin accused both Bukharin and Trotsky of making "theoretical mistakes" on the matter.

== Aftermath ==
The resolution adopted at the 10th Congress, On the Role and Tasks of the Trade Unions, banned factions within the Party and redefined the role of trade unions as supportive but not entirely subordinate to the state. This compromise allowed the Party to maintain unity but did not fully resolve the underlying tensions between those advocating for a more democratic form of worker representation and those pushing for tighter state control.

The three secretaries of the Central Committee then had to resign. Nikolay Krestinsky lost his Politburo, Orgburo, and Secretariat posts and became the Soviet ambassador to Germany.
