= Olga Pilatskaya =

Russian activist

- Ольга Пилацкая
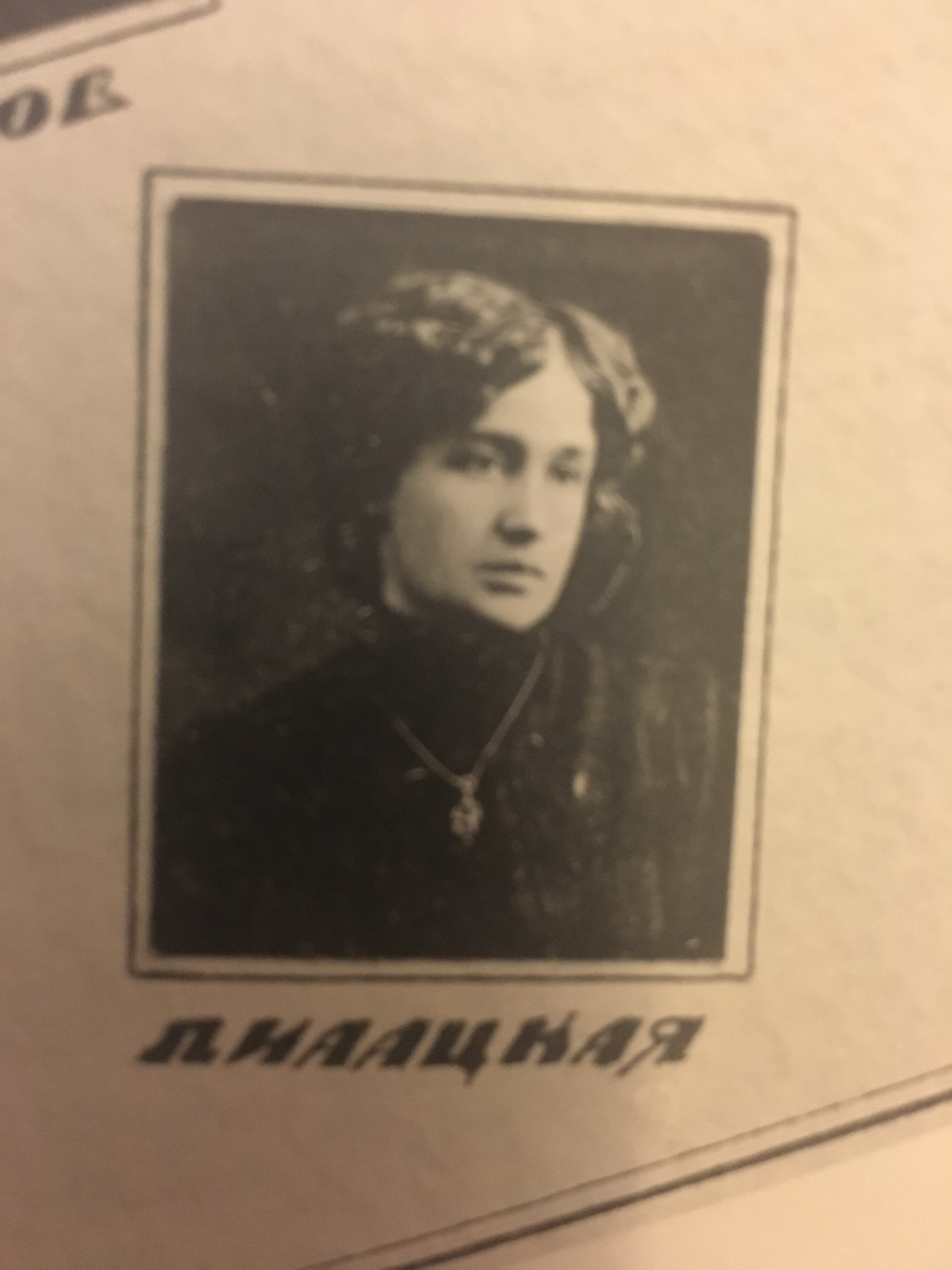

Member of Presidium of the All-Ukrainian Central Executive Committee
- In office 29 November 1927 – 27 May 1937
- President: Grigory Petrovsky

Member of the Central Committee of the Communist Party of Ukraine
- In office 29 November 1927 – 27 January 1938

Personal details
- Born: 30 July 1884 Moscow, Russian Empire
- Died: 22 December 1937 (aged 53) Soviet Union
- Cause of death: Execution by shooting
- Party: Russian Social Democratic Labour Party (1904–1918); Russian Communist Party (1918–1922); Ukrainian Communist Party (1922–1937)
- Spouse: Vladimir Zagorsky

Olga Vladimirovna Pilatskaya (Russian: Ольга Владимировна Пилацкая; 1884–1937) was a Russian Revolutionary and Bolshevik Party activist. She joined the party during the Russian Revolution of 1905 and went on to participate in the October Revolution as a member of the party's Moscow district committee. She filled a number of roles in Moscow until the end of the Russian Civil War, upon which she was transferred to the Ukrainian Soviet Socialist Republic. She became a leading figure within the Communist Party of Ukraine, joining its Central Committee and taking a number of roles within the All-Ukrainian Central Executive Committee. She was stripped of all her positions after her arrest and execution during the Great Purge.

== Biography ==
Olga Pilatskaya was born on 30 July [O.S. 18 July] 1884 in Moscow, into a working-class family. She graduated from the Moscow Mariinsky Women's School.

In 1904, she joined the Russian Social Democratic Labour Party (RSDLP) and became a member of its Bolshevik faction. She was elected to the RSDLP's Moscow district committee and, in 1905, participated in the December Uprising. In 1909, Olga Pilatskaya was elected a member of the Russian Bureau of the RSDLP's Central Committee. But the following year, she was arrested and internally exiled to Saratov. She fled abroad with her husband Vladimir Zagorsky, moving to Leipzig, where she worked with Vladimir Lenin. In 1914 she returned home to Moscow, where she carried out underground work for the Bolsheviks.

After the February Revolution in 1917, she was again made a member of the RSDLP's Moscow District Committee. She also briefly became a member of the Bolshevik Central Committee, during the events of the October Revolution. In the wake of the Bolshevik takeover, she was appointed secretary of the city's revolutionary committee, as a judge of the local People's Court and as an investigator for the provincial Cheka. In 1921, she joined the People's Commissariat for Education, becoming the secretary of the party's agitprop department.

Following the establishment of the Soviet Union in 1922, she was transferred to Ukraine, where she headed the Communist Party of Ukraine's agitprop department in Katerynoslav province. On 12 December 1925, she was put up as a candidate for the party's Central Committee, which she finally joined on 29 November 1927. On the day she joined the party's central committee, she was simultaneously appointed as head of the women's department of the party, as a member of the presidium of the All-Ukrainian Central Executive Committee, and as a member of the Ukrainian Organisational Bureau. In December 1927, she was a Ukrainian delegate to the 15th Congress of the All-Union Communist Party, and in 1928, she was also delegated to the 6th World Congress of the Communist International.

On 9 April 1929, she was put forward as a candidate for the secretariat of the party's central committee, although her candidacy was rejected on 5 June 1930. Instead, she was appointed as deputy chairman of the Ukrainian State Planning Committee, a position she held until 1937. During this period, she was a delegate to the 16th Congress and 17th All-Union Communist Party Congresses, worked as director of the Ukrainian Institute of Red Professorship from 1932 to 1934 and as director of the Institute of Party History from 1934 to 1936.

In 1937, she was arrested during the Great Purge and consequently stripped of her positions in the Central Executive Committee and the Organisational Bureau. On 22 December 1937, she was executed by shooting. The following month, on 27 January 1938, Pilatskaya was posthumously excluded from membership of the Central Committee of the Communist Party of Ukraine.

== Bibliography ==
- Astakhova, Natalia Vladimirovna (1969). Товарищ Ольга (in Russian). Moscow: Mosk. rabochii. OCLC 18485949.
