= The Mass Strike, the Political Party and the Trade Unions =

1906 booklet by Rosa Luxemburg

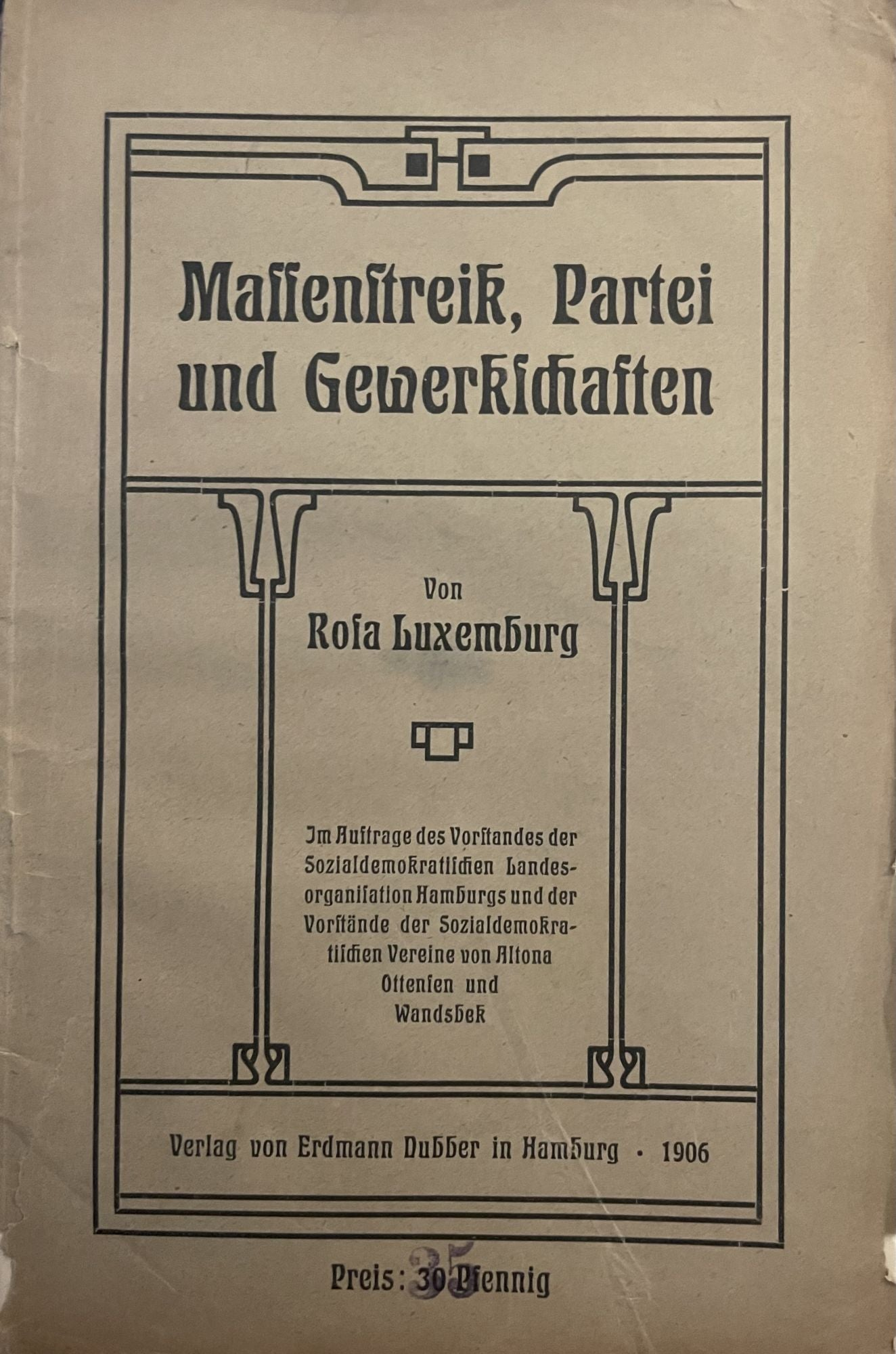
- Author: Rosa Luxemburg
- Original title: Massenstreik, Partei und Gewerkschaften
- Translator: Patrick Lavin
- Language: German
- Publication date: 1906

The Mass Strike, the Political Party and the Trade Unions (German: Massenstreik, Partei und Gewerkschaften) is a 1906 booklet by Rosa Luxemburg that evaluates the events of the 1905 Revolution in the Russian Empire, poses them as an analogy for German socialists to learn from, and argues for a political 'mass strike'. It was translated into English by Patrick Lavin and published by The Marxist Educational Society in Detroit in 1925.

Notably, in this booklet Luxemburg concluded that the spontaneous development of mass movements are important to a successful revolutionary movement, a perspective known as the Luxumburgism of spontaneity. She bases this viewpoint on her observations from 1905 where spontaneous mass strikes strengthened the readiness for action and the creativity of the proletariat. She argues that a mass strike did not need a perfect or complete socialist organization to exist before taking action. It is also one of the leading works urging socialists to take an offensive position, positing the political mass strike as an example.

The Mass Strike contributed to the discourse by linking economic and political conflicts together, a perspective that continues in discussions among modern socialists.

In 1921 Karl Radek claimed that The Mass Strike was the first document of German communism, stating "With this pamphlet begins the separation of the communist movement from social democracy in Germany." This argument has been called "elliptical" but "not untrue".

== Background ==
As she did with other places with revolutionary potential, Luxemburg saw the worker organising that was taking place in Russia and moved there to follow it. In December 1905, Luxemburg went to Russia undercover as Anna Matschke, an anonymous Polish journalist. She was arrested on 4 March 1906 and was held in prison until 28 June 1906. In and out of prison, she saw her two roles while in Russia as, one, to postulate tasks for the Russian and Polish proletarians, and two, to translate these events to the benefit of German socialists.

Also in 1905, there were a wave of strikes throughout Germany and the mass strike in Russia gave the German economic disobedience a more politically self-conscious character. The German Social-Democratic Party (SPD) moved left and supported solidarity with the Russian proletariat. German anarchists who had been moved to the periphery began moving into the outskirts of the party once more as the mass strike, an anarchist tradition, gained vogue. Still, it was the SPD that emphasized the precedence Russia's example meant for Germany. The small, intellectual group who argued this was intellectually led by Luxemburg.

Responding to revisionist (Note: Revisionist in the Marxist sense.) critiques of her calls for radical revolution, stemming from the mass strike, for which she was called "bloody Rosa" and an imitation of Joan of Arc, Rosa identified the German trade-union leaders as the most dangerous vehicle for revisionism of the times. She compared them to the radical Russian trade union leaders. She also compared them to Poland's trade union leaders and their actions to Polish actions on International Workers' Day. She further moved the debate about trade unions' roles in revolutions beyond the personal scope and out of its particular context by posing it as a question of the relationship between trade unions and party. In February 1906, responding to this challenge in theory, the SPD made an agreement with the trade-union leaders:

the latter were officially accorded autonomy in all trade-union questions and the party in practice abdicated any right to enforce political policy on the unions without the latter’s full consent. The fact that the agreement was secret proved its departure from recognized and established practice. With this, the executive’s participation in the revolutionary atmosphere of 1905, already breathless and failing, had finally come to an end.

Rosa responded to the party's revisionist stance by differing against official party opinions, using the events of 1905 to continue building theory around the mass strike. She traveled around Germany and "In spite of an overload of literary and organizational work for the Polish revolutionary movement, and in spite of poor health, she unleashed a quite extraordinary spate of agitational work in Germany." However, Luxemburg spoke in such a way to give the impression that her speeches, calling for a need for flexibility in the party, were given with the Party's blessing rather than speeches in their opposition. Through this dispute, Luxemburg had pressed Russia's 1905 experience as an analogy for German usage further than anyone else.

Finally able to leave Warsaw on the eight of August 1906, Luxemburg was made to report to the police of Finland. There, she wrote The Mass Strike at the request of Hamburg's SPD after having intensive discussions about its topic with Vladimir Lenin and his immediate Bolshevik circle. The SPD executive decided to publish a toned-down version of the booklet in an attempt to save the frigid relationship between the party and the trade union leaders. However, the provincial organization of the party who were also the commissioners, resented this. After all the time spent writing about the 1905 Revolution and publishing her work, Luxemburg still found the party leaders unwilling to learn from Russia's example.

== Synopsis ==
Luxemburg defines an offensive strategy for the German socialist movement in The Mass Strike that is based on her observations of the 1905 Russian Revolution. She argues that socialists should use any opportunity to motivate the proletariat to act, including spontaneous and creative movements by the workers, which she believed Germany's strike actions would be, following Russia's example. Mass actions cannot be ordered by party leaders, but come from many different factors of the lives of the proletariat. Socialists, she argues, should encourage workers with speeches and solidarity.

She makes the argument that the Russian form of the mass strike would be followed throughout the international socialist movement. Also, in the same way that Russia's strike led to new organisations the same would happen in German during their mass strikes. The previously existing organisations had become like brakes and would become outdated if they refused to move with the masses.
