= Voznesensky Lane =

Street in Moscow, Russia

Coordinates: 55°45′34″N 37°36′20″E

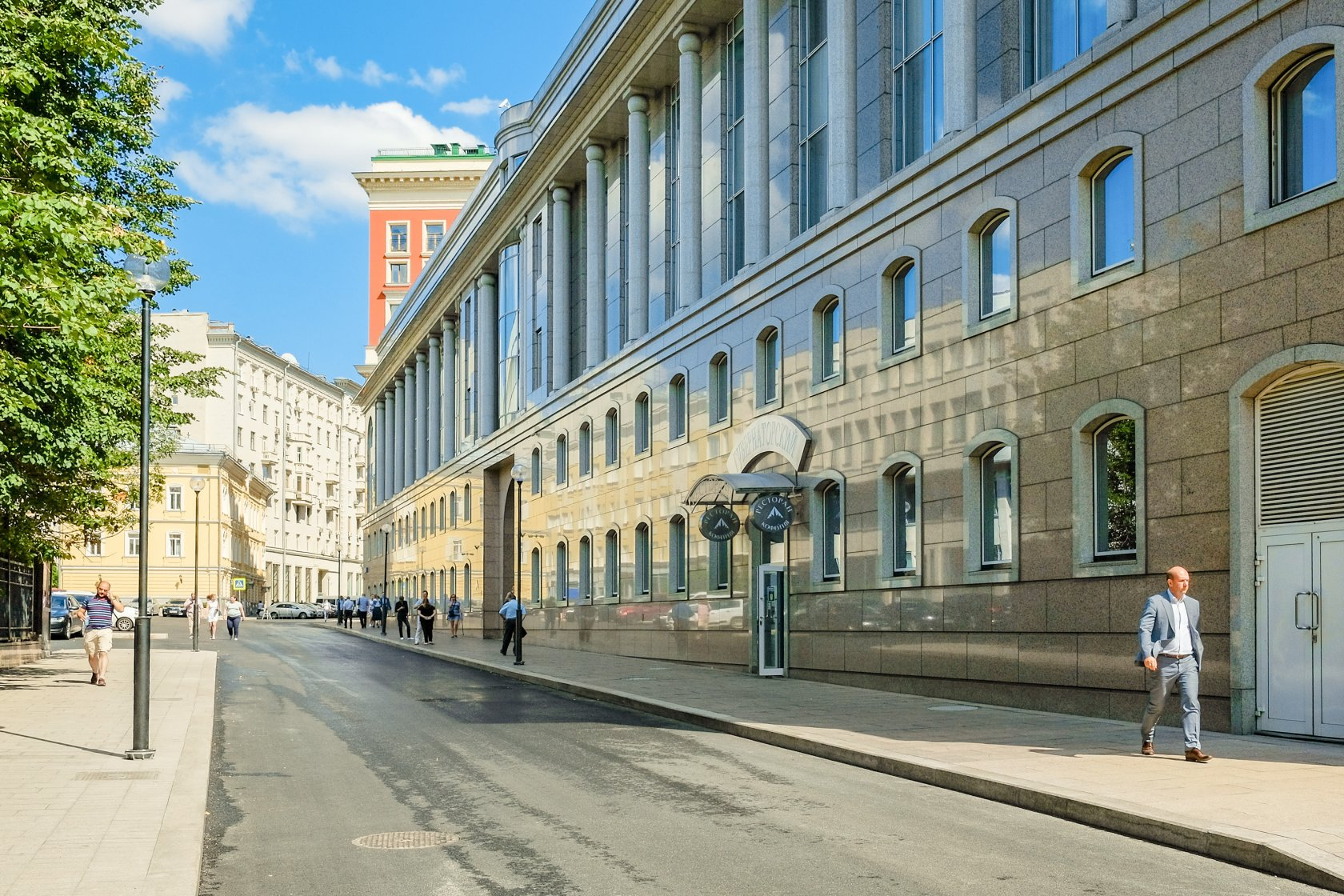
- Voznesensky Lane, 2016
- Interactive map of Voznesensky Lane
- Native name: Вознесенский переулок (Russian)
- Length: 0.65 km (0.40 mi)
- Location: Moscow, Russia; Central Administrative Okrug
- Postal code: 125032, 125009 (single building)
- Nearest metro station: Arbatskaya; Tverskaya; Pushkinskaya

Voznesensky Lane (Russian: Вознесенский переулок) (first known name - Novgorodsky, and then from the end of the 16th to the end of the 18th century - the Ascension, the end of the 18th century to 1922 - Bolshoy Chernyshyovsky, 1922-1993 - Stankevich, 1994 on, once again Voznesensky) is a lane in Arbat and Prenya districts of the Central Administrative District of the Federal City of Moscow. Voznesensky Lane passes from Bolshaya Nikitskaya Street Tverskaya Street between Leontevsky Lane and Bryusov Lane. Numbering of houses begins from Bolshaya Nikitskaya Street.

== History ==
Wooden Church of the Assumption in this place known since the beginning of the 16th century, stone built in 1584, the Tsar Feodor I in memory of his coronation, and since then two centuries called Voznesensky Pereulok.

In 1782 he was appointed governor of the Moscow Count Zakhar Chernyshyov, a famous military leader who lived on his estate in Tver. For him, the house was built, the palace became the residence of the governor general of Moscow, and after the revolution, occupied by Moscow City Council, now - the building of the Moscow City Hall. Since the end of the 18th century Voznesensky Pereulok, at the corner of Tverskaya street which was a governor-general's palace, came to be called the Big Chernyshёvskim.

In 1922, Bolshoy Chernyshyovsky Lane was renamed in honor of Nikolai Stankevich, writer and head of the literary-philosophical circle of the 1830s, whose brother had a house (№ 6) in the lane.

In 1994, Lane returned to the name of the 18th century.
