= Central Committee of the 9th Congress of the Russian Communist Party (Bolsheviks) =

Central Committee of the 9th Congress
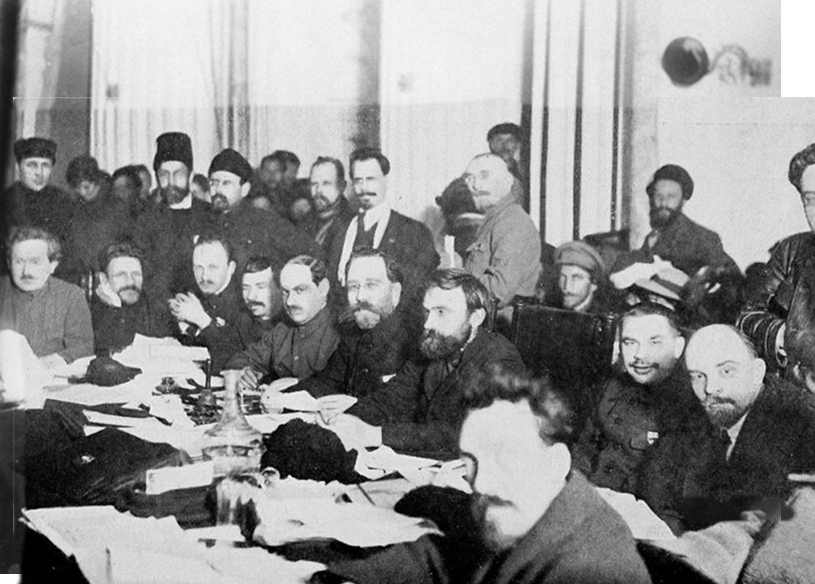
- The Presidium of the 9th Party Congress

5 April 1920 – 16 March 1921
- Responsible Secretary: Nikolai Krestinsky
- Inner-groups: Politburo: 5 full & 3 candidates Secretariat: 3 members Orgburo: 5 full & 2 candidates

Candidates

The Central Committee (CC) composition was elected by the 9th Congress, and sat from 5 April 1920 until 16 March 1921. The CC 1st Plenary Session renewed the composition of the Politburo, Secretariat and the Organizational Bureau (OB) of the Russian Communist Party (Bolsheviks).

== Plenary sessions ==
Plenary sessions of the Central Committee
Plenum	Date	Length
1st Plenary Session	5 April 1920	1 day
2nd Plenary Session	8 April 1920	1 day
3rd Plenary Session	16 July 1920	1 day
4th Plenary Session	17 July 1920	1 day
5th Plenary Session	5 August 1920	1 day
6th Plenary Session	20 September 1920	1 day
7th Plenary Session	21 September 1920	1 day
8th Plenary Session	23 September 1920	1 day
9th Plenary Session	29 September 1920	1 day
10th Plenary Session	8 November 1920	1 day
11th Plenary Session	morning – 9 November 1920	1 day
12th Plenary Session	evening – 9 November 1920	1 day
13th Plenary Session	10 November 1920	1 day
14th Plenary Session	3 December 1920	1 day
15th Plenary Session	7–9 December 1920	3 days
16th Plenary Session	17 December 1920	1 day
17th Plenary Session	20 December 1920	1 day
18th Plenary Session	24 December 1920	1 day
19th Plenary Session	27 December 1920	1 day
20th Plenary Session	4 January 1921	1 day
21st Plenary Session	12 January 1921	1 day
22nd Plenary Session	24 January 1921	1 day
23rd Plenary Session	26 January 1921	1 day
24th Plenary Session	24–25 February 1921	2 days
25th Plenary Session	7 March 1921	1 day

== Composition ==
=== Members ===
Members of the Central Committee of the 9th Congress of the Russian Communist Party (Bolsheviks)
Name	Cyrillic	8th CC	10th CC	Birth	Death	PM	Nationality	Gender	Portrait
Andrey Andreyev	Андрей Андреев	New	Not	1895	1971	1914	Russian	Male	
Nikolai Bukharin	Никола́й Буха́рин	Old	Reelected	1888	1938	1906	Russian	Male	
Felix Dzerzhinsky	Фе́ликс Дзержи́нский	Old	Reelected	1877	1926	1906	Polish	Male	
Mikhail Kalinin	Михаил Калинин	Old	Reelected	1875	1946	1898	Russian	Male	
Lev Kamenev	Лев Ка́менев	Old	Reelected	1883	1936	1901	Jewish-Russian (Note: His father was Jewish and his mother Russian)	Male	
Nikolay Krestinsky	Никола́й Крести́нский	Old	Not	1883	1938	1901	Ukrainian	Male	
Vladimir Lenin	Владимир Ленин	Old	Reelected	1870	1924	1898	Russian	Male	
Yevgeni Preobrazhensky	Евге́ний Преображе́нский	Old	Not	1886	1937	1903	Russian	Male	
Karl Radek	Карл Радек	Old	Reelected	1885	1939	1903	Jewish	Male	
Christian Rakovsky	Христиан Раковский	Old	Reelected	1873	1941	1917	Bulgarian	Male	
Jānis Rudzutaks	Ян Рудзутак	New	Reelected	1887	1938	1905	Latvian	Male	
Alexei Rykov	Алексей Рыков	New	Reelected	1881	1938	1899	Russian	Male	
Leonid Serebryakov	Леонид Серебряков	Old	Not	1890	1937	1905	Russian	Male	
Fyodor Sergeyev	Фёдор Серге́ев	Candidate	Reelected	1895	1921	1914	Russian	Male	
Ivan Smirnov	Иван Смирнов	Candidate	Candidate	1881	1936	1899	Russian	Male	
Joseph Stalin	Ио́сиф Ста́лин	Old	Reelected	1878	1953	1898	Georgian	Male	
Mikhail Tomsky	Михаил Томский	Old	Reelected	1880	1936	1904	Russian	Male	
Leon Trotsky	Лев Тро́цкий	Old	Reelected	1879	1940	1917	Jewish	Male	
Grigory Zinoviev	Григо́рий Зино́вьев	Old	Reelected	1883	1936	1901	Jewish	Male	

=== Candidates ===
Candidate Members of the Central Committee of the 9th Congress of the Russian Communist Party (Bolsheviks)
Name	Cyrillic	8th CC	10th CC	Birth	Death	PM	Nationality	Gender	Portrait
Alexander Beloborodov	Александр Белобородов	Candidate	Not	1891	1938	1907	Russian	Male	
Sergey Gusev	Сергей Гусев	New	Candidate	1874	1933	1898	Jewish	Male	
Vladimir Milyutin	Владимир Милютин	New	Candidate	1884	1937	1910	Russian	Male	
Vyacheslav Molotov	Вячеслав Молотов	New	Member	1890	1986	1906	Russian	Male	
Matvei Muranov	Матвей Муранов	Candidate	Not	1873	1959	1904	Ukrainian	Male	
Viktor Nogin	Ви́ктор Ноги́н	New	Not	1878	1924	1898	Russian	Male	
Grigory Petrovsky	Григо́рій Петро́вський	New	Member	1878	1958	1898	Ukrainian	Male	
Osip Piatnitsky	Осип Пятницкий	New	Not	1882	1938	1899	Jewish	Male	
Ivar Smilga	Ивар Смилга	Member	Not	1892	1938	1907	Latvian	Male	
Pēteris Stučka	Пётр Сту́чка	Member	Not	1865	1932	1906	Latvian	Male	
Yemelyan Yaroslavsky	Емельян Ярославский	Candidate	Member	1878	1943	1898	Jewish	Male	
Pyotr Zalutsky	Петро Залуцький	New	Candidate	1887	1937	1907	Russian	Male	
