= Capitalist Encirclement =

Soviet ideology

Capitalist encirclement was a Soviet ideology that taught that the Soviet Union was surrounded by ideological enemies. The ideology eventually ended in the late 1950s after a speech by the then-leader, Nikita Khrushchev.

== History ==
Stalin believed that the capitalist (or Western powers) wanted to weaken the Soviet Union and, when possible, intervene militarily. This fear had begun during the civil war in which countries such as France and the United Kingdom had provided support to the White movement. The British government was reportedly open to financing terrorist actions by the Whites in order to overthrow the Soviet government. Furthermore, the Soviet leadership thought that Britain and France had financed and provided military assistance (such as 600 advisors near Warsaw) to the Poles who attacked Russia in 1920. During the 1920s, Stalin seemed to think that there was no possibility of "peaceful coexistence". In the Long Telegram, it was reported that (in 1927) Stalin said that:

In course of further development of international revolution there will emerge two centers of world significance: a socialist center, drawing to itself the countries which tend toward socialism, and a capitalist center, drawing to itself the countries that incline toward capitalism. Battle between these two centers for command of world economy will decide fate of capitalism and of communism in entire world.

After the Second World War, the USSR was mainly surrounded by socialist and communist countries (called the Eastern Bloc). This led some within the USSR to believe that this "encirclement" was over, contrary to the belief of the state-controlled newspapers. The newspapers (which were essentially the view of the party due to state control) argued that this was not a geographical encirclement. The newspaper Kommunist wrote: "so long as capitalism remains in the principal capitalist countries, it would be wrong to speak of the liquidation of the capitalist encirclement".

During the later part of the Cold War, the theory of Capitalist encirclement was ended under Nikita Khrushchev when he said that "Capitalist encirclement of our country no longer exists" on January 27, 1959, during the 21st Party Congress.

== Ideology ==
Soviet leader Joseph Stalin believed that the Soviet Union was surrounded by capitalist countries that meant to harm the Soviet Union. The USSR believed that as they began to rebuild their military and economy, they would be at increased risk of attack. They feared that this attack on the USSR might succeed after the internal anger sown by the Great Break. This led to relations that would not have otherwise happened, such as one with France. Some scholars argue that the USSR became less isolated as a result of this policy, with the USSR attempting to normalize relations with the French government.

During the late 1920s, the Soviets began to believe in the idea of "indivisible peace", which was a change from the previous belief that peace was temporary and should only occur to increase the power of the USSR. This change in doctrine led to increased global cooperation, which they hoped would help their survival. Although the rapprochement led to a relaxation of international relations, it was not the reasoning behind the relations getting closer; rather, it regarded France as the main Western danger.

== See also ==
- Stalinism
- Ideology of the Communist Party of the Soviet Union
- Russian Civil War 1918–1922
- Marxism–Leninism
- Program of the Communist Party of the Soviet Union
