= Politburo, Secretariat and Orgburo of the 9th Congress of the Russian Communist Party (Bolsheviks) =

Supreme political authority in Soviet Union 1920–1921

The Politburo, Secretariat and Orgburo of the 9th Congress of the Russian Communist Party (Bolsheviks) were elected by the 1st Plenary Session of the 9th Central Committee, in the immediate aftermath of the 9th Congress.

== 9th Politburo ==
9th Politburo and Secretariat

5 April 1920 – 16 March 1921

Candidate members
Name (birth–death)	Took office	Left office	Duration
Nikolai Bukharin (1888–1938)	5 April 1920	16 March 1921	345 days
Grigoriy Zinoviev (1883–1936)	5 April 1920	16 March 1921	345 days
Mikhail Kalinin (1875–1946)	5 April 1920	16 March 1921	345 days

Full members
Name (birth–death)	Took office	Left office	Duration
Lev Kamenev (1883–1936)	5 April 1920	16 March 1921	345 days
Nikolay Krestinsky (1883–1938)	5 April 1920	16 March 1921	345 days
Vladimir Lenin (1870–1924)	5 April 1920	16 March 1921	345 days
Joseph Stalin (1878–1953)	5 April 1920	16 March 1921	345 days
Leon Trotsky (1879–1940)	5 April 1920	16 March 1921	345 days

== 9th Secretariat ==
Name (birth–death)	Took office	Left office	Duration	Note
Nikolay Krestinsky (1883–1938)	5 April 1920	16 March 1921	345 days	Elected Responsible Secretary at the 1st Plenary Session.
Yevgeni Preobrazhensky (1886–1937)	5 April 1920	16 March 1921	345 days	—
Leonid Serebryakov (1890–1937)	5 April 1920	16 March 1921	345 days	—

== 9th Orgburo ==
=== Full members ===
Name (birth–death)	Took office	Left office	Duration
Nikolay Krestinsky (1883–1938)	5 April 1920	16 March 1921	345 days
Yevgeni Preobrazhensky (1886–1937)	5 April 1920	16 March 1921	345 days
Alexey Rykov (1881–1938)	5 April 1920	16 March 1921	345 days
Leonid Serebryakov (1890–1937)	5 April 1920	16 March 1921	345 days
Joseph Stalin (1878–1953)	5 April 1920	16 March 1921	345 days

=== Candidate members ===
Name (birth–death)	Took office	Left office	Duration
Felix Dzerzhinsky (1877–1926)	5 April 1920	16 March 1921	345 days
Mikhail Tomsky (1880–1936)	5 April 1920	16 March 1921	345 days
