= Vladimir Zagorsky =

Russian politician (1883–1919)

- Владимир Загорский
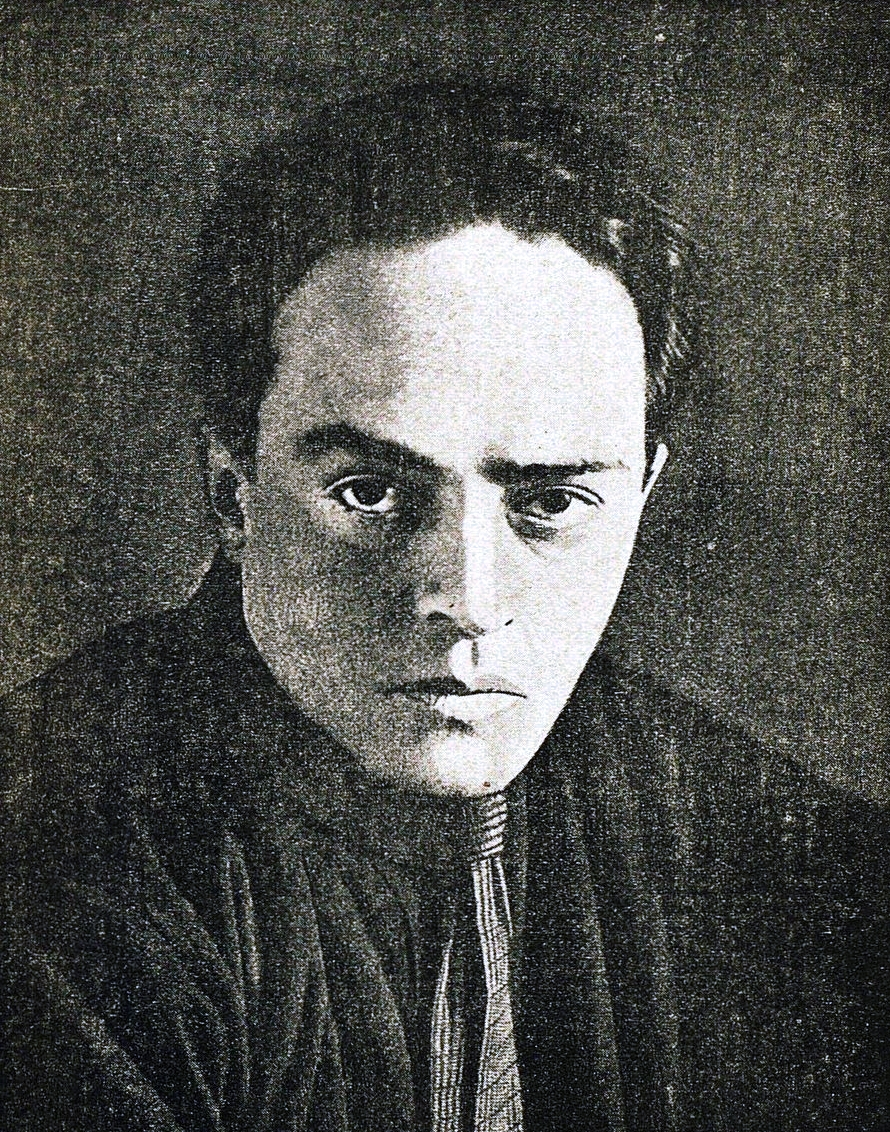
- Zagorsky c. 1910s
- Born: Wolf Mikhelevich Lubotsky; Denis (Alias); January 15, 1883; Nizhny Novgorod, Russian Empire
- Died: September 25, 1919 (aged 36); Moscow, Russian SFSR
- Resting place: Kremlin Wall Necropolis, Moscow
- Citizenship: Russian Empire; Soviet Russia
- Occupations: Revolutionary, party leader, Secretary of the Moscow Committee of the Russian Communist Party (Bolsheviks)
- Political party: RSDLP (1901–1903); RSDLP (Bolsheviks) (1903–1918); Russian Communist Party (Bolsheviks) (1918–1919)

Vladimir Mikhailovich Zagorsky (real name Wolf Mikhelevich Lubotsky, January 15, 1883 – September 25, 1919) was a revolutionary, party activist, Secretary of the Moscow Committee of the Russian Communist Party (Bolsheviks).

== Biography ==
=== Early life and beginning of revolutionary activity ===
Born into a Jewish family, Zagorsky began his revolutionary career as a schoolboy, together with his friend and future Russian Communist Party chairman Yakov Sverdlov. He distributed leaflets in Nizhny Novgorod and worked in workers' circles. Member of the Russian Social Democratic Labor Party (Bolsheviks) since 1901. In 1902, for participation in the May Day demonstration, he was arrested, sentenced to eternal settlement in the Yenisey Province. In an attempt to escape, the punishment was toughened by ordering to spend 12 years in exile in the Yakutsk Province.

In 1904, he escaped from exile to Geneva. He met with Lenin on several occasions. On January 9, 1905, he was arrested and expelled from Switzerland.

=== Participation in the First Revolution ===
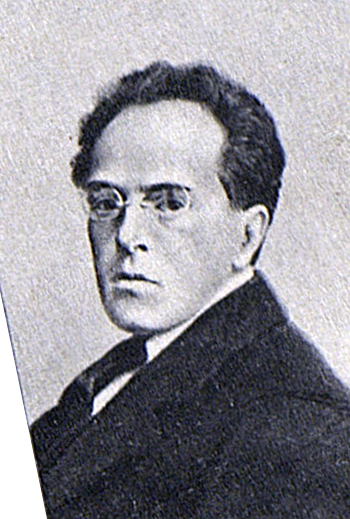
Vladimir Zagorsky, 1905

Already as Zagorsky returned to Russia. During the Revolution of 1905, he took part in the December Uprising in Moscow. The party pseudonym was Comrade Denis. Participated in the publication of "Izvestia of the Moscow Council". He fought on barricades in the area of Pimenskaya Street, then at Presnya. After the defeat of the uprising, he worked underground.

In 1908, he emigrated to London. In 1910, he returned illegally to Saratov. Betrayed by a provocateur, he fled to Leipzig under the name of "the son of the priest Mikhail Pushcharovsky". Participated in the preparation of the Prague Conference of the Russian Social Democratic Labour Party. After the outbreak of the First World War, he was interned by the German government. Conducted propaganda among Russian prisoners of war. In April 1918, after the October Revolution and the signing of the Brest Peace Treaty, he was released.

=== Activities in the Russian Socialist Federative Soviet Republic ===
From April 16 to June 1918, he worked as the First Secretary of the Plenipotentiary Representation of the Russian Socialist Federative Soviet Republic in Germany – the first Soviet diplomatic mission abroad. In June 1918, he was recalled by the Central Committee of the Russian Communist Party (Bolsheviks) to Moscow, where since July 27, 1918, he has been working as the Secretary of the Moscow City Committee of the Russian Communist Party (Bolsheviks). Delegate to the 8th Congress of the Russian Communist Party (Bolsheviks). In September 1919, together with Felix Dzerzhinsky, he headed the City Defense Committee.

=== Death and burial ===
Killed on September 25, 1919, by a bomb thrown by members of an anarchist group at the premises of the Moscow Committee of the Russian Communist Party (Bolsheviks) in Leontievsky Lane. According to eyewitnesses, Zagorsky from the presidium table rushed towards the shot, to the place where the shell fell, to prevent danger; as he walked, he shouted: "Quiet, nothing special, we will now find out what is the matter". By this, he, apparently, brought some peace of mind, which prevented the hustle and bustle: a significant part of those present managed to leave the room. Zagorsky is buried in Mass Grave No. 1 of the Kremlin Wall Necropolis in Red Square, Moscow.

He was married to Olga Pilatskaya.

== Remembrance ==
- In honor of Vladimir Zagorsky, the city of Sergiev of the Moscow Oblast was renamed in 1930, and a district of the Moscow Region was named after him. In 1976, a monument to Vladimir Zagorsky was erected in the city (sculptor A. Efremenko). In 1991, following a local referendum, the city was renamed Sergiev Posad and the district was renamed accordingly.
  Памятник Владимиру Загорскому в городе Сергиев Посад
- On Tkatskaya Street in Moscow, No. 25, there was the so–called "Vladimir Zagorsky Working Palace", at the opening of which on May 1, 1920, Vladimir Lenin spoke. A historical monument of the early 19th century of regional significance.
- Zagorsky Passage in Moscow is named after him.
- Library No. 117 in Moscow (Chelyabinskaya Street, 24, Building 3) is named after him.
- In the city of Chemnitz (Germany) there is Vladimir Zagorsky Street (Wladimir–Sagorski–Straße).
- In 1921, Vera Mukhina presented a project for a monument to Vladimir Zagorsky in Moscow, but it was not implemented.
- Vladimir Zagorsky became the prototype for the film character of Gorsky (actor Valery Zolotukhin) in the Soviet film "About Friends and Comrades" (Mosfilm, 1970).
- Monument to Vladimir Zagorsky in Sergiev Posad (1967), sculptor Alexander Efremenko.

== Sources ==
- Alexey Abramov. At the Kremlin Wall – Moscow, Publishing House of Political Literature of the Central Committee of the Communist Party of the Soviet Union, 1988 – ISBN 5-250-00071-1
- Irina Guro. Explosion – Moscow: Children's Literature, 1973 – 189 Pages
- Ivan Shchegolikhin. Burden of Choice: The Story of Vladimir Zagorsky (Fiery Revolutionaries Series) – Moscow, Publishing House of Political Literature of the Central Committee of the Communist Party of the Soviet Union, 1979 – 352 Pages
- Moscow. Encyclopedia. 1980
