= Yevgeni Preobrazhensky =

Soviet revolutionary and economist (1886–1937)

- Евгений Преображенский
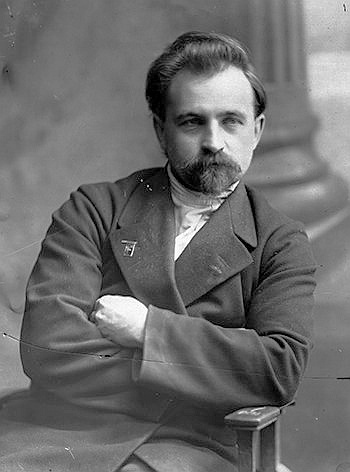

Personal details
- Born: 27 February [O.S. 15 February] 1886 Bolkhov, Oryol Governorate, Russian Empire
- Died: 13 February 1937 (aged 50) Moscow, Russian SFSR, Soviet Union
- Cause of death: Execution by shooting
- Resting place: Donskoye Cemetery
- Party: RSDLP (Bolsheviks) (1903–1918); RCP(b) (1918–1927, 1930–1933)
- Central institution membership: 1920: Head, Propaganda and Agitation Department of the 9th Central Committee of RCP(b); 1920–1921: Member, Secretariat of the 9th Congress of RCP(b); 1920–1921: Member, Orgburo of the 9th Congress of RCP(b); 1920–1921: Full member, 9th Central Committee of RCP(b); 1917–1918: Candidate member, 6th Central Committee of RSDLP; Other offices held: 1920: Chairman, Ufa Provincial Committee of the RCP(b); 1918–1919: Chairman, Ural Regional Committee of the RCP(b); 1918: Delegate, Fifth All–Russian Congress of Soviets; 1917: Delegate, First All-Russian Congress of Soviets; 1917: Deputy Chairman, Chita Soviet

Yevgeni Alekseyevich Preobrazhensky (Russian: Евгений Алексеевич Преображенский, IPA: [jɪvˈɡʲenʲɪj ɐlʲɪkˈsʲejɪvʲɪtɕ prʲɪəbrɐˈʐɛnskʲɪj]; 27 February [O.S. 15 February] 1886 – 13 February 1937) was a Russian revolutionary, Soviet politician, and Marxist economist. His main contribution to Marxist theory is the concept of "primitive socialist accumulation", which holds that industrialization in an underdeveloped and agrarian economy such as Russia's in 1917 must rely on the squeezing of agriculture, for example by the socialist state buying agricultural goods at low prices and selling back industrial goods at high prices.

Preobrazhensky joined the Russian Social Democratic Labor Party in 1903, and after the establishment of Soviet Russia became a party secretary and member of the Central Committee in 1920. During the 1920s, he opposed Joseph Stalin's bureaucratization and centralization of the party and advocacy of "socialism in one country", becoming linked to Leon Trotsky and a leader of the Left Opposition movement. In 1927, he was removed from the party on Stalin's orders, but was re-admitted in 1930 after Stalin had moved towards his favored policies. During Stalin's Great Purge, Preobrazhensky was arrested in 1935 and shot in 1937.

== Early years ==
Yevgeni Alekseyevich Preobrazhensky was born in Bolkhov, Oryol Governorate, Russian Empire on 27 February [O.S. 15 February] 1886. His father was the son of an Orthodox priest who taught for seven years in a zemstvo school before his ordination in 1883. Following his appointment as a parish priest in Bolkhov in the summer of 1883, the elder Preobrazhensky opened an elementary school for the parish at his own expense. It was in that school that Yevgeni was first educated.

In an autobiography written for the Great Russian Encyclopedia, he recalled being a very religious child and intellectually precocious child, who learned to read at the age of four. After leaving his father's private school, Preobrazhensky spent two years attending the state-operated Bolkhov public school. He subsequently left the town to attend the classically oriented gymnasium in the provincial capital of Oryol, where Preobrazhensky remembered himself as the "second-best student in the class".

It was during his years at the Orël gymnasium that Preobrazhensky first became interested in politics, turning from the subjects taught in the classical gymnasium to reading newspapers, intellectual journals, history textbooks, and socially oriented novels. At the age of 14, he decided that he was an atheist, and rejected "the religious quackery" that he witnessed firsthand. This brought him into conflict with his priestly father, who in 1902 was appointed dean of the network of church-run schools in Bolkhov parish. The estrangement between father and son would last for decades.

During his fifth of eight years at the gymnasium, Preobrazhensky began to accumulate illegal radical literature, including a proclamation by revolutionary students of the Ekaterinoslav Mining Institute, an account of a beating of protesting students at the hands of Cossacks, and hectographed editions of radical poetry and song lyrics. That summer, upon his return to the family home at Bolkhov, Preobrazhensky closely reviewed this and other illegal material and determined to become actively involved in the revolutionary movement seeking the overthrow of the Tsarist regime in Russia.

== Underground revolutionary ==
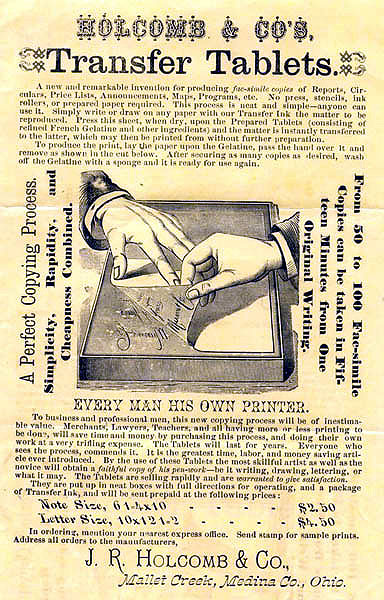
An advertisement for a hectograph with which Preobrazhensky and other Russian revolutionaries frequently reproduced their underground proclamations and leaflets using this simple printing technique

Preobrazhensky decided to henceforth "devote a minimum of time to the gymnasium's subjects", merely enough to attain passing marks, to dedicate the bulk of his hours to the study of history and economics. Among the budding revolutionaries who were his friends was one Alexander Aleksin, the son of a local printer, whom Preobrazhensky persuaded to steal lead type from his father's printing works, to establish an illegal print shop of his own that could produce better results than a hectograph could provide.

Preobrazhensky attempted to set type for a pamphlet reproducing revolutionary song lyrics and a declaration "We Renounce the Old World," but his inferior printing equipment fell apart before he could master the process, and the type was eventually returned to Aleksin's printworks, without any printed publications being produced.

During his seventh year at the gymnasium, Preobrazhensky felt compelled to choose which revolutionary organisation to support, being torn between the competing strategies of the peasant-oriented Socialist-Revolutionary Party (PSR) and the Marxist Russian Social Democratic Labour Party (RSDLP). Influenced by the Communist Manifesto and The Development of Scientific Socialism work by Frederick Engels, Preobrazhensky cast his lot with the latter, believing its approach to be scientifically based. Together with two friends, Evgraf Litkens and Ivan Anisimov (who later joined the Mensheviks), Preobrazhensky declared his formal allegiance to the RSDLP late in 1903.

After the start of the Russo-Japanese War, the Orël committee of the RSDLP issued an anti-war proclamation, which the three students were ordered to distribute. They did this by sneaking into the changing room and stuffing over 150 copies into the coat pockets of older students. The police investigated, but could not identify the culprits, and all three were accepted as members of the RSDLP.

During the summer before his eighth and final year at the Orël gymnasium, Preobrazhensky worked as a RSDLP propagandist to the workers of the Dyatkovo factory in Bryansky raion. Preobrazhensky was able to recruit the son of the Bryansky police to the RSDLP and successfully managed to conceal his small rotary mimeograph machine from searching authorities in a locked drawer of the inspector's own desk. Periodic meetings were held in the neighboring forest. In October 1905, Preobrazhensky was co-opted onto the Orël party committee. The RSDLP had by then split between the Bolsheviks, led by Vladimir Lenin, and Mensheviks. The 19 year Preobrazhensky was one of only two convinced Bolsheviks on the committee.

In November 1905, Preobrazhensky traveled to Moscow where he was promoted to the position of chief propagandist for the urban Presnensky raion., and for the next 12 years, he was an itinerant professional revolutionary. He was arrested for the first time in Perm in March 1906, but released after five months. He then moved to the Ural region, which he represented at the 4th RSDLP party conference in Helsingfors (Helsinki) in November 1907. From autumn 1909, he was a member of the Bolshevik Party bureau in Irkutsk. He was arrested several times. On trial with other Bolsheviks in Yekaterinburg, he was defended by Alexander Kerensky, who in 1917 was head of the Provisional Government, until it was overthrown by the Bolsheviks.

After the February Revolution, in 1917, Preobrazhensky returned to the Urals, where he was elected to the regional party committee, which he represented at the 6th Congress of the Bolshevik Party, beginning near the end of July 1917, where he was elected as a candidate member (alternate) to the party's governing Central Committee.

== Years in authority ==
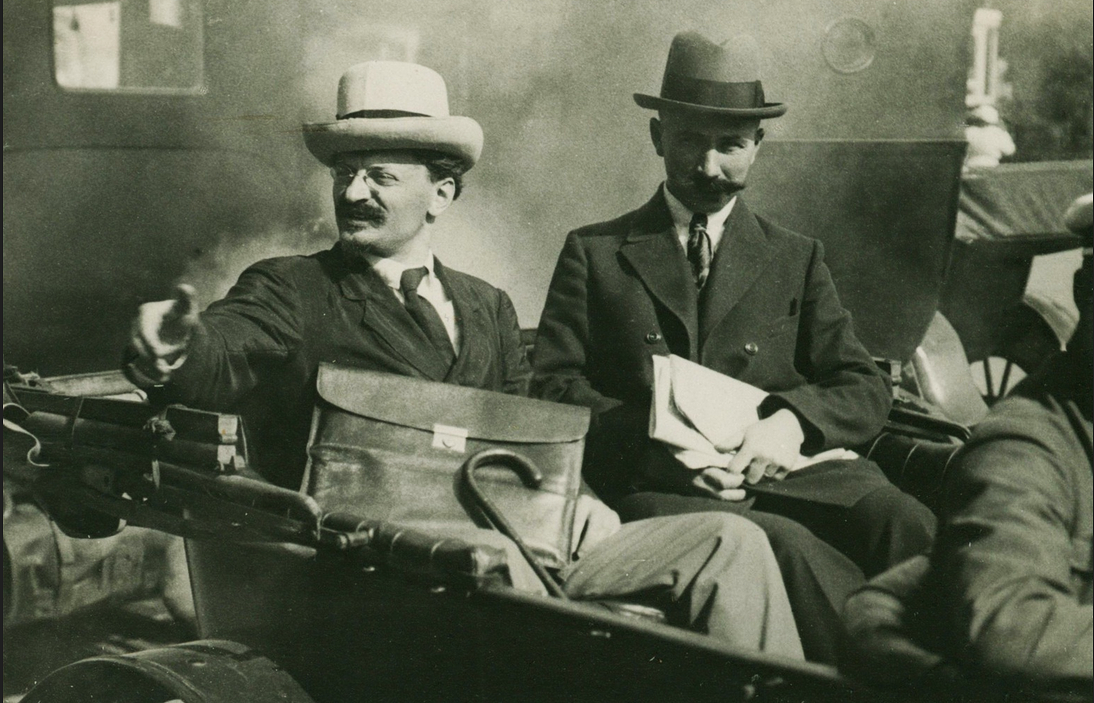
Trotsky and his personal secretary, Yevgeni Preobrazhensky in 1918

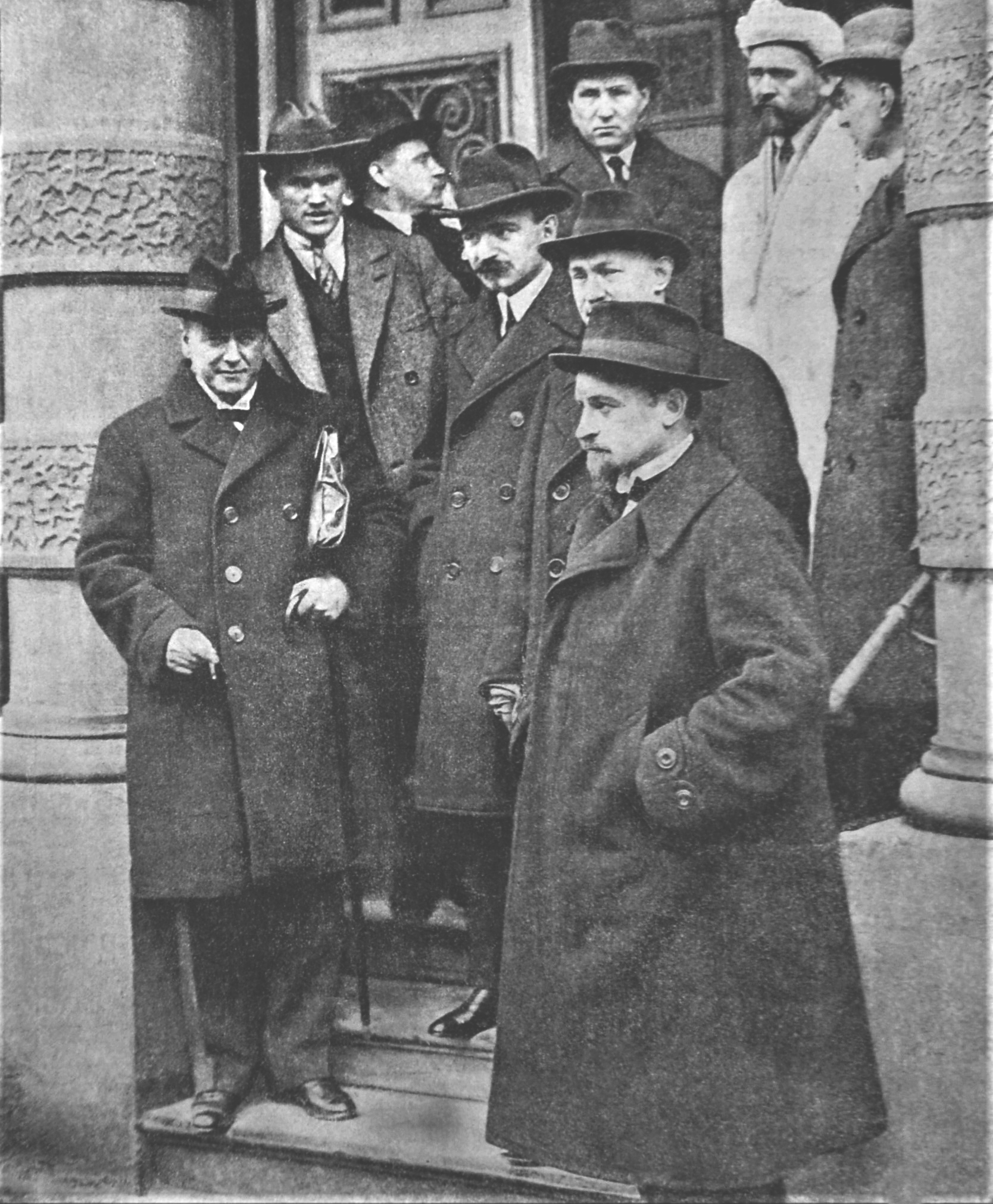
Photo showing Christian Rakovsky on the left, Preobrazhensky in the middle and Grigori Sokolnikov on the right during Soviet–United Kingdom negotiations in London, March 1924

From January 1918, Preobrazhensky was a candidate member of the Ural Provincial Committee of the Bolshevik Party. He was President of the Presidium of the Ural Regional Committee of the Communist Party from May 1918 and was in that post when Nicholas II and his family were killed in the city of Yekaterinburg, though it was the Ural Regional Soviet under Alexander Beloborodov, Boris Didkovsky and Filipp Goloshchyokin who directly ordered the execution of the Imperial Family. Nonetheless, Preobrazhensky was aware of the decision in advance and discussed the matter with Lenin in Moscow.

In 1918, Preobrazhensky joined the Left Communists faction, which opposed the draconian peace with Germany established by the Treaty of Brest-Litovsk. It was at this time that Preobrazhensky became closely affiliated with Nikolai Bukharin, himself a popular Left Communist leader and member of the party Central Committee.

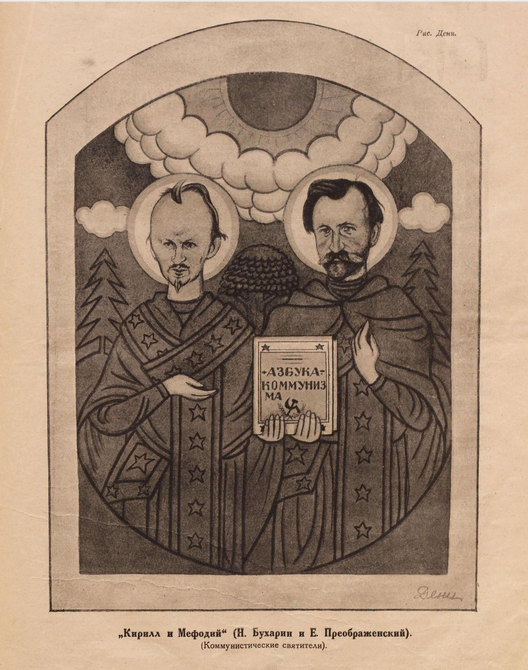
A cartoon by Viktor Deni published in Prozhektor (Searchlight) depicting Nikolai Bukharin and Preobrazhensky as Cyril and Methodius holding The ABC of Communism, 1923

In 1919, he co-wrote the book The ABC of Communism with Nikolai Bukharin, who would strongly disagree with him on the industrialization issue. He also wrote The New Economics, a polemical essay on the dynamics of an economy in transition to socialism, Anarchism and Communism and The Decline of Capitalism.

Preobrazhensky was elected a full member of the Central Committee of the Russian Communist Party at its 9th Congress, which opened at the end of March 1920. He was at the same time elected one of three secretaries of the Central Committee, and a member of the Orgburo. The other two party secretaries, Nikolay Krestinsky and Leonid Serebryakov were both ill during 1920–21, which meant that Preobrazhensky carried most of the work and was, in effect, the 'real master' of the party apparatus.

This was the most powerful post Preobrazhensky ever held. During 1920–21, the staff employed by the secretariat expanded to over 600, including a new section tasked with building up a card index that graded party members according to whether they were 'active and reliable', 'promising', or 'rank and file'. This system was later used by Joseph Stalin, who took over the secretariat two years later, to crush dissent within the party, which Preobrazhensky refused to do. Writing in Pravda on 22 January 1921, he declared that "This possibility of greater freedom of criticism represents one of the conquests of the revolution."

The Tenth Party Congress, in March 1921, was riven by a dispute over the role of the trade unions, in which Lenin and Leon Trotsky were on opposite sides, with Preobrazhensky and the other secretaries backing Trotsky. The party was also shaken by the Kronstadt rebellion, in the light of which Lenin resolved to ban organised factions within the party. All three party secretaries were sacked and lost their membership of the Central Committee.

In 1921, Preobrazhensky was appointed President of the party's Financial Committee and Chief of the Directorate for Professional Training in the People's Commissariat of Education. Through the 1920s, he was a leading Soviet Economist, developing the plan for industrialisation of the country and an opponent of the New Economic Policy. From 1924, he was one of the editors of Pravda, and a member of the Board of People's Commissariat of Finance.

== Left Opposition ==
Soviet delegation in France

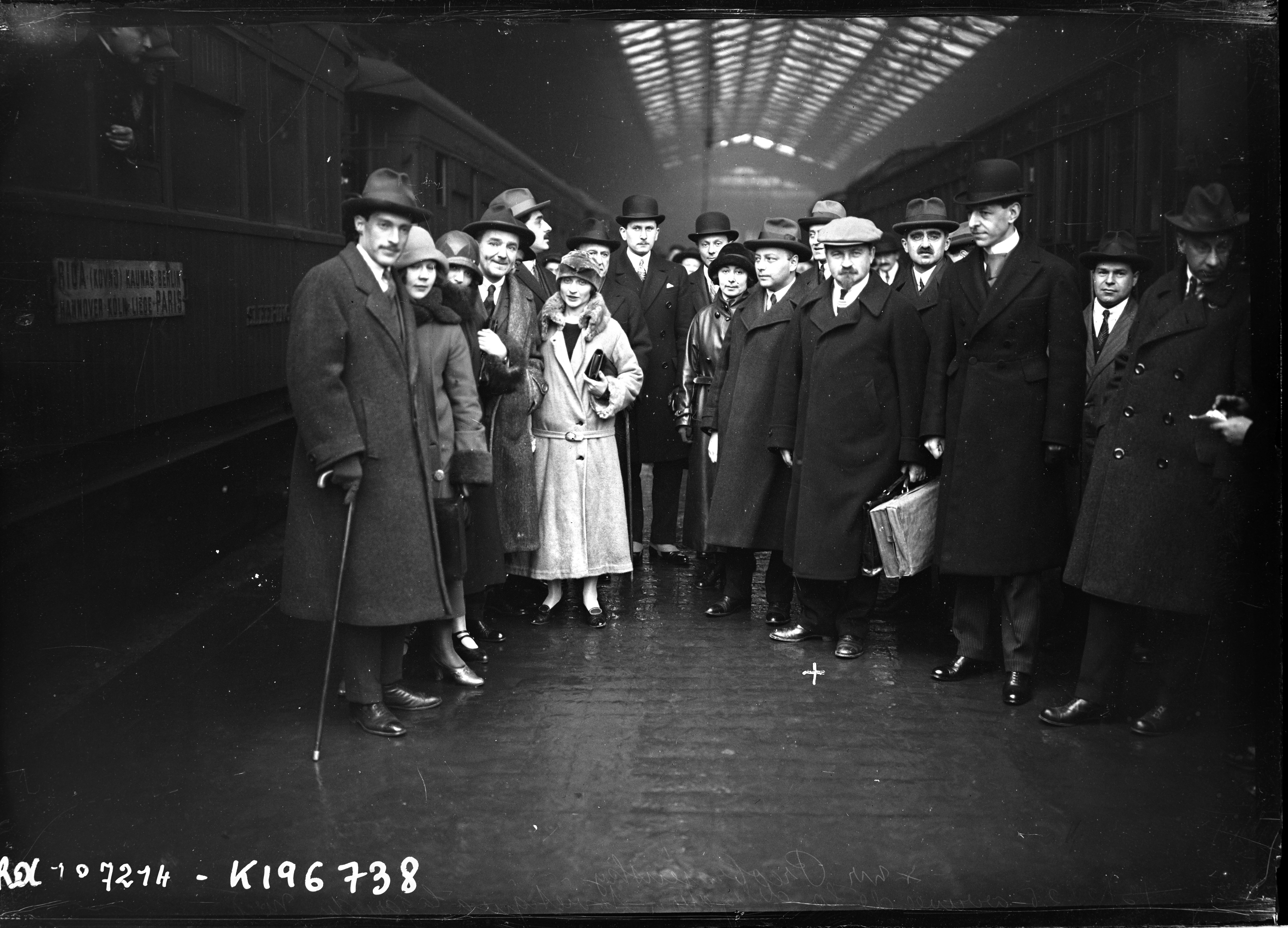
Preobrazhensky (on the right, holding the briefcase) at the Gare du Nord, 13 February 1926

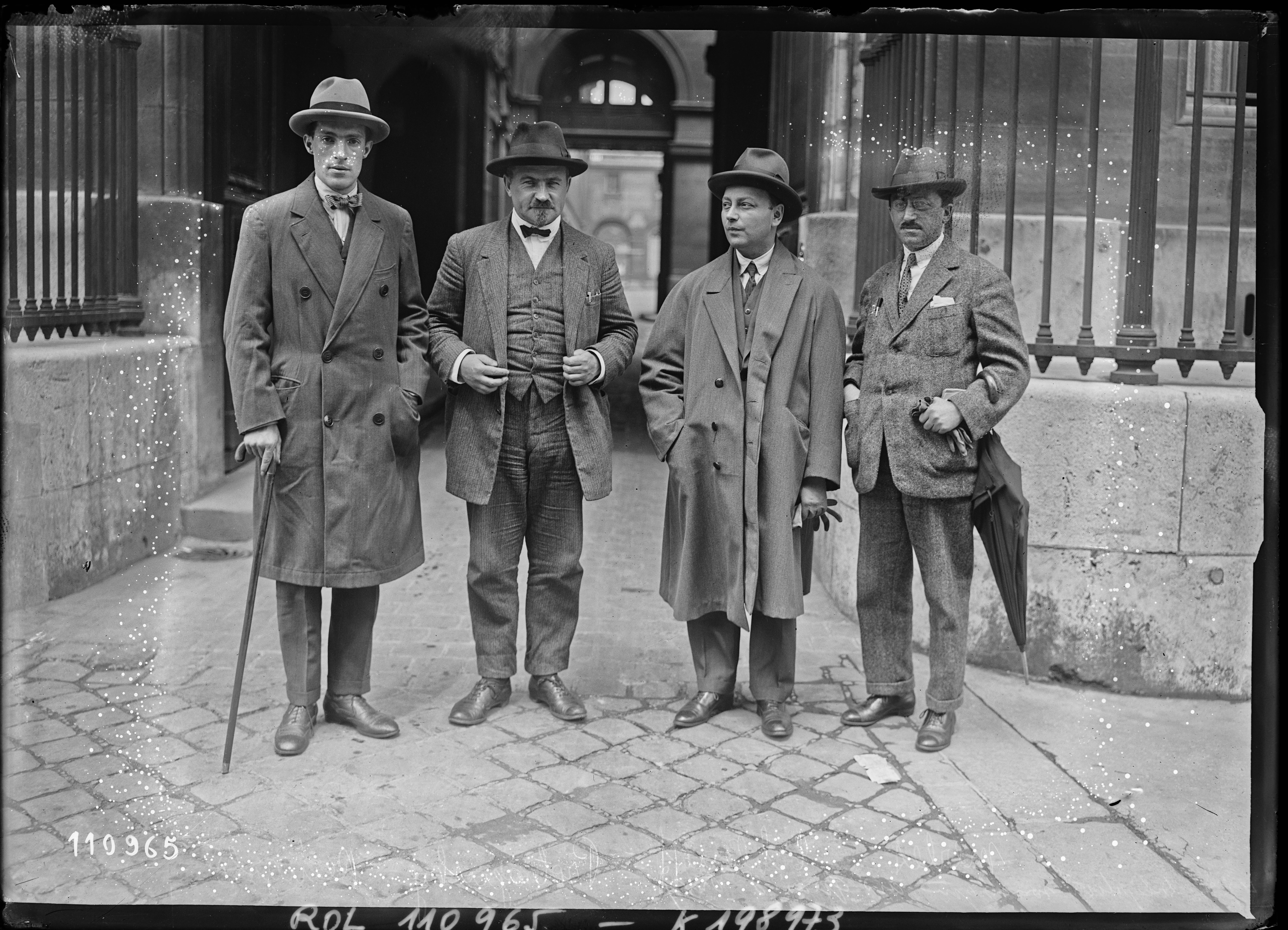
Preobrazhensky (second from left) at the Quai d'Orsay, 4 July 1926

Preobrazhensky was the original leader of the Left Opposition, for a few months before Trotsky openly broke with Stalin after Lenin's death. He was the main author and leader signatory of The Declaration of 46, which called for greater freedom of dissent within the communist party, and attacked the leadership for having no strategy to deal with the current economic crisis. He was also the author of the theory of Primitive socialist accumulation, which argued that the state would have to lower the price of agricultural and increase the price of consumer goods, to extract the capital needed to expand soviet industry from the peasants, who made up 80 per cent of the population. He published a series of articles on the topic in Vestnik Kommunisticheskoi Akademii (Bulletin of the Communist Academy) in 1924. These ideas were later expanded at book length in a 1926 volume, The New Economics. and were the basic economic tenets of the Left, or Trotskyist opposition, which brought Trotsky and Preobrazhensky together.

Preobrazhensky visited Trotsky when he was in Berlin for medical treatment in 1926, an "interesting" fact that Stalin, noted in a letter to Molotov after it had been reported back to him by the OGPU.

Preobrazhensky (and Trotsky) advocated for a rapid pace of industrialization in the context of the Soviet Union's New Economic Policy, arguing that the numerically limited Communist Party faced a grave danger of being swamped by the richest and most powerful individuals in the villages (the so-called kulaks) and the mass of peasants who might naturally follow these local leaders. Differential pricing needed to be used, the pair claimed, with relatively high retail prices charged for textiles and manufactured goods of utility to the rural population and comparatively low prices paid for agricultural products, thereby generating a surplus to finance industrial growth.

This program was presented polemically in opposition to the policy of the Communist Party leadership, headed in this period by Stalin and Preobrazhensky's former collaborator on the book The ABC of Communism, Nikolai Bukharin, who felt the rich peasantry to be under control and who advocated reducing prices and improving quality of textiles and manufactured goods to spur peasant production of grain and win the sympathy of the rural and urban working people for the task of socialist development.

== Personality ==
Trotsky's biographer, Isaac Deutscher wrote:

A man of rare erudition and analytical gifts, Preobrazhensky was primarily a scholar, pursuing his line of reasoning no matter what unpopular conclusions it might lead him and no matter what damage it might do to his standing with the party. He thought in elaborate and massive theorems ... Many regard Preobrazhensky rather than Trotsky as the real author of the Opposition's economic programme. He created at any rate its theoretical groundwork. There were, however, implicit divergencies between his and Trotsky's views; but these did not become explicit and result in serious political conflict until 1928.

Victor Serge, who met Preobrazhensky in the 1920s, recalled that "he had driven himself so hard that during meetings it seemed that he might at any moment drop off to sleep; but his brain was still fresh, and crammed with statistics."

== Expulsion ==
In 1927, the United Opposition, which now included former foes, Grigory Zinoviev, Lev Kamenev and their supporters, thrashed out a comprehensive Platform summing up their criticisms of the party line (which Trotsky published while he was in exile, under the title The Real Situation in Russia). Trotsky demanded that the Central Committee publish and circulate it in time for it to be debated at the Fifteenth Party Congress, which was to be held in December. Stalin fiercely insisted that this request be refused, but copies of the Platform were produced and circulated in defiance of the party leadership.

On the night of September 12/13, 1927, the OGPU raided a private house and uncovered a printing press, which had been used to print this and other opposition literature. They arrested the Old Bolshevik Sergei Mrachkovsky, who was running the press, and announced that they had also caught a former officer who had fought against the Bolsheviks in the White Army of Baron Wrangel. The presence of the 'Wrangel officer' was given huge publicity in the soviet press, to discredit the left, though when the Central Committee met in October, Stalin casually admitted that he was an OGPU informer. Mrachkovsky was expelled from the party, with 11 others, on 28 September. When their case came before the Central Control Commission, Preobrazhensky and Serebryakov submitted a statement seeking to refute the slander about a 'Wrangel officer', in which they admitted to a share of responsibility for the existence of the press. For that, they were expelled from the party early in October. It was the first time that expulsion had been used against eminent Old Bolsheviks.

On 7 November 1927, Preobrazhensky took part in a demonstration to mark the tenth anniversary of the Bolshevik revolution but was attacked by a crowd as he tried to address the crowd from a balcony. In January 1928, he was sent to the Ural Mountains and worked in the planning agencies.

In April 1929, Preobrazhensky published an appeal entitled 'To All Comrades in Arms' in which, without repudiating the Opposition's past, he argued that since Stalin had altered the party's course and had begun rapid industrialisation of the Soviet economy, the opposition now had a duty to reconcile itself to the party line. In May, he was allowed to travel to Moscow to negotiate the terms on which he and others might be allowed to return to the party. In June, he was joined Karl Radek and Ivar Smilga. On 13 July 1929, the three of them signed a letter in Pravda declaring that they had made an "ideological and organizational break with Trotskyism". About 400 deportees followed their lead in asking to have their party membership restored.

== Opposition and execution ==
In January 1930, Preobrazhensky was restored to membership in the Communist Party and appointed to the Nizhny Novgorod Planning Committee. In 1932, he was made a member of the Board of the People's Commissariat of the Light Industry, acting head of the People's Commissariat of State Farms.

On an unknown date, he joined Ivan Smirnov's secret opposition group which, by the end of 1932, had entered a bloc with Leon Trotsky and some others in the USSR. In January 1933, he was arrested by the OGPU, charged with membership of ""the counter-revolutionary Trotskyist group of Smirnov I.N., Ter-Vaganyan V.A., Preobrazhensky Ye.A. and others". He was sentenced to three years of exile and expelled from the party once again, but was again readmitted to the party later in 1933.

In February 1934, Preobrazhensky was one of the leading ex-oppositionists who were allowed to address the 17th Party Congress. He said that he was "ashamed" to remember his part in the 7 November 1927 demonstration, praised Stalin's "tremendous insight" and "tremendous courage", and praised workers who, in the old days, ignored those who opposed Lenin and always backed him because that way "you can't go wrong".

He was arrested a second time on December 20, 1936 but, unlike his old comrades, such as Serebryakov, Mrachkovsky, Smirnov and Ter-Vaganyan, he was not a defendant at any of the Moscow Show Trials, though he may have been under the same pressure as they all were to make a false confession. Preobrazhensky was arrested again on 2 January 1937 On July 13, 1937, he was sentenced to death by a secret tribunal and shot the same day. He was posthumously rehabilitated by the government of Mikhail Gorbachev on 22 December 1988.

== Economic ideas ==
He argued in The New Economics that the Soviet Union had to undergo "primitive socialist accumulation", a reflection of primitive accumulation of capital that early Capitalism experienced. He posited that it was impossible for the small industrial sector of the Soviet Union alone to provide the means of industrialization, and that the USSR would have to extract surplus from the peasantry in order to fund further industrial development. He describes this process as "the exploitation of one system by the other." This theory was criticized politically by figures such as Bukharin, and immediately associated with Trotsky and the Left Opposition. Some argue that it was put into practice by Stalin in the 1930s when Stalin said in a speech that the Soviet Union had to accomplish in a decade what England had taken centuries to do in terms of economic development to be prepared for an invasion from the West. However, it is noted that Preobrazhensky and the Left Opposition did not believe this process should or would come about via coercion. The argument that Stalin did eventually put primitive socialist accumulation into practice is disputed by Trotskyists and Soviet historians.

In The New Economics (1926), Preobrazhensky advanced two verbal propositions: first, that the state can increase capital accumulation by lowering agricultural prices relative to industrial prices; and second, that doing so would not reduce the welfare of industrial workers. In a 1984 paper, Raaj Sah and Joseph Stiglitz showed in a mathematical model that the first proposition holds but the second does not. For these propositions and later research, see Primitive socialist accumulation § Economic Research on Preobrazhensky's Work.

== Works ==
=== English translations ===
- ABC of Communism: Volume 1. With Nikolai Bukharin. Patrick Lavin, trans. Detroit, MI: Marxian Educational Society, 1921.
- Third Anniversary of the Russian Revolution. Glasgow, Scotland: Union Publishing Co., 1921.
- The New Economics. Brian Pearce, trans. London: Oxford University Press, 1965.
- From NEP to Socialism: A Glance into the Future of Russia and Europe. Brian Pearce, trans. London: New Park Publications, 1973.
- The Crisis of Soviet Industrialization: Selected Essays. Donald A. Filtzer, ed. London: Macmillan, 1980.
- The Decline of Capitalism. Richard B. Day, trans. Armonk, NY: M.E. Sharpe, 1985.
- The Preobrazhensky Papers: Archival Documents and Materials: Volume I, 1886–1920. [2014] Richard B. Day and Mikhail M. Gorinov, trans and eds. Chicago: Haymarket Books, 2015.
- The Preobrazhensky Papers: Volume 2: The New Economics Theory and Practice, 1922–1928. [2022] Richard B. Day, trans. Edited by Sergei Tsakunov, Mikhail M. Gorinov, and Richard B. Day. Chicago: Haymarket Books, 2023.
- The Preobrazhensky Papers: Volume 3: Concrete Analysis of the Soviet Economy. Richard B. Day, trans. Edited by Sergei Tsakunov, Mikhail M. Gorinov, and Richard B. Day. Chicago: Haymarket Books, 2023.

=== In Russian ===
- О крестьянских коммунах. (Разговор коммуниста-большевика с крестьянином) (On Peasant Communes: Conversation of a Communist-Bolshevik with a Peasant). Moscow: Kommunist, 1918.
- Нужна ли хлебная монополия? (Do We Need a Grain Monopoly?) Moscow: Izdatel'stvo Vserossiiskogo Tentral'nogo Ispolitel'nogo Komiteta Sovetov R., S., K. i K. Deputatov, 1918.
- С кем идти крестьянской бедноте? (With Whom Will the Peasant Poor March?) Smolensk: 1918.
- Крестьянская Россия и социализм. (К пересмотру нaшeй aграрнoй программы) (Peasant Russia and Socialism: Towards Revision of Our Agrarian Program). Petrograd: Priboi, 1918.
- Азбука коммунизма: Популарное объяснение программы Российской коммунистической партий большевиков (The ABC of Communism: A Popular Explanation of the Program of the Russian Communist Party of Bolsheviks). With N.I. Bukharin. Moscow: Gosudarstvennoe izdatelʹstvo, 1920.
- Трёхлетие Октябрьской революции (Third Anniversary of the Russian Revolution). Moscow: Gosudarstvennoe izdatelʹstvo, 1920.
- "Перспективы новой экономической политики" (Perspectives on the New Economic Policy). Krasnyi nov', (1921) No. 3, pp. 201–212.
- Анархизм и коммунизм (Anarchism and Communism). Moscow: Gosudarstvennoe izdatel'stvo, 1921.
- Бумажные деньги в эпоху пролетарской диктатуры (Paper Money in the Epoch of Proletarian Dictatorship). Tiflis, Georgia: Gosudarstvennoe izdatel'stvo, 1921.
- Финансы в эпоху диктатуры пролетариата (Finances in the Epoch of the Dictatorship of the Proletariat). Moscow: People's Commissariat of Finance, 1921.
- Вопросы финансовой политики (Questions of Financial Policy). Moscow: Gosudarstvennoe izdatel'stvo, 1921.
- "Русский рубль за время войны и революции" (The Russian Ruble in Time of War and Revolution). Krasnyi nov', (1922) No. 3, pp. 242–257.
- "Крах капитализма в Европе" (The Collapse of Capitalism in Europe). Krasnyi nov', (1922) No. 5, pp. 151–165.
- Причины падeния курса нашего рубля (Reasons for the Declining Course of Our Ruble). Moscow: People's Commissariat of Finance, 1922.
- Ot NEPa k sot︠s︡ializmu (vzgli︠a︡d na budushchee Rossii i Evropy) (From NEP to Socialism: View of the Future of Russia and Europe). Moscow: Moskovskii rabochii, 1922.
- Итоги Генуезской кoнфerenции и хoзияственные перспективы Европы (Results of the Genoa Conference and the Economic Prospects of Europe). Moscow: Gosudarstvennoe izdatelʹstvo, 1922.
- О морали и классовых нормах (On Morals and Class Norms). Moscow-Petrograd: 1923.
- О нем (About Him). Moscow: Gosizdat, 1924.
- В.И. Ленин: Сoциолoгичeский набросок (V.I. Lenin: A Sociological Sketch). Moscow: Krasnyi nov', 1924.
- Русские финансы и европеиская биржа в 1904–1906 г.г. (Russian Finances and European Market in 1904–1906). Moscow: Moskovskii rabochii, 1926.
- Экономика и финансы современной Франции (Economics and Finances of Contemporary France). Moscow: Izdatel'stvo Kommunisticheskoi akademii, 1926.
- Новая экономика: Опыт теоретического анализа советского хозяиства (The New Economics: Experience of the Theoretical Analysis of the Soviet Economy). Moscow: Izdatel'stvo Kommunisticheskoi akademii, 1926.
- Закат капитализма: Воспроизводство и кризисы при империализме и мировой кризис 1930–1931 г.г. (The Sunset of Capitalism: Reproduction and Crises associated with Imperialism and the World Crisis of 1930–1931). Moscow: 1931.

== See also ==
- Outline of the Russian Revolution and Civil War
- Bibliography of the Russian Revolution and Civil War
- Bibliography of Stalinism and the Soviet Union
- Index of Old Bolsheviks
- Index of articles related to the Russian Revolution and Civil War
