= 9th Congress of the Russian Communist Party (Bolsheviks) =

1920 party meeting

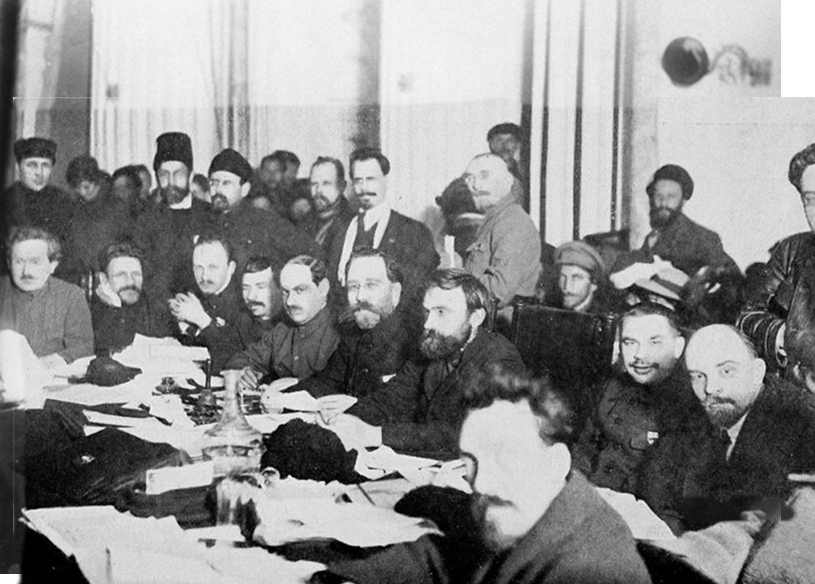
The presidium of the 9th Congress of the Russian Communist Party (Bolsheviks), 29 March 1920. Seated (from left): Enukidze, Kalinin, Bukharin, Tomsky, Lashevich, Kamenev, Preobrazhensky, Serebriakov, Lenin and Rykov.

The 9th Congress of the Russian Communist Party took place from 29 March 1920 through 5 April 1920. The Congress opened in the Bolshoi Theatre with an introductory speech by Vladimir Lenin, with subsequent meetings of the Congress held at the Kremlin. Present at the Congress were 715 delegates, of whom 553 had full voting rights and 162 could speak but not vote.

The 9th Congress marked the third annual governing assembly of the Russian Communist Party since that organization's October 1917 seizure of power. (Note: This followed the Extraordinary 7th Congress of March 1918 and the 8th Congress of March 1919.) Moreover, it was also directly preceded by the party's 8th Conference, held in December 1919. (Note: Conferences were smaller scale interim gatherings assembled between congresses; they did not select new governing central committees.)

The 9th Congress elected a new Central Committee, consisting of 19 full members and 12 non-voting "candidate" members — an increase in size of four from the previous CC.

== Background ==
In the spring of 1920, the Russian Civil War was beginning to draw to a close, with the Red Army notching victories over restorationist White forces in the South, East, and North and the intervening foreign powers of Europe, exhausted and impoverished by the bloodshed entailed by World War I in little mood to commit to a controversial all-out invasion of Soviet Russia.

The Russian economy was in shambles, showing the effects of urban depopulation, industrial disrepair and disorganization, and the collapse of the national currency and related resistance of the peasantry to the de facto robbery of grain stores through armed requisitioning.

The 9th Congress of the RKP(b) was called to order on March 29 by party leader Vladimir Ulyanov (Lenin). After briefly welcoming the delegates, Lenin moved on to deliver the keynote speech of the Congress, the Political Report of the Central Committee.

== Agenda ==
The agenda included:

- The report of the Central Committee;
- A report on the immediate tasks of economic construction;
- A report on the trade union movement;
- A report on organizational questions;
- A report on the tasks of the Communist International;
- The subject of cooperatives;
- The transition to a militia system;
- The final item on the agenda was elections to the Central Committee of the party.

== Main topics of the Congress ==
=== Political report of the Central Committee ===
Lenin first noted that the Central Committee of the RKP(b) had adopted a fundamental structural change since the 8th Congress of 1919 by electing two subcommittees — a Political Bureau to deal with questions of foreign and domestic politics and policy, and an Organizing Bureau to deal with the assignment of personnel. A Secretary was to maintain membership on both bodies to assure that the two groups acted in concert rather than at cross-purposes.

Policy decrees had come in a torrent during the preceding year, Lenin noted:

"It must be said that the questions were so numerous that they frequently had to be decided under conditions of extreme haste, and it was only because the members of the body concerned were so well acquainted with each other, knew every shade of opinion, and had confidence in each other that this work could be done at all.... When deciding complex questions it frequently happened that meetings had to be replaced by telephone conversations."

Lenin indicated that the political work of the Central Committee in the year since the 8th Congress in the spring of 1919 had consisted primarily of two areas of focus: military and diplomatic policy, and matters of economic reconstruction.

Lenin stated that behind the slogans "Everything for victory!" and "Everything for war!", the Bolshevik regime had found it "necessary to deliberately and openly leave some of the most essential needs unsatisfied, and time and again to deny assistance to many, in the conviction that all forces had to be concentrated on the war." This deprivation had achieved its purpose, he continued, bringing "the victory of the Russian revolution over Denikin, Yudenich, and Kolchak" as a "guarantee of the world social revolution." Only "Party discipline," and the "strictest centralization," "self-sacrifice," and unshakable confidence in the ultimate outcome had made this result possible possible, Lenin declared.

The result was a "historical miracle" in which "a weak, exhausted, and backward country was able to defeat the most powerful countries in the world," according to Lenin. Unity had triumphed over a splintered capitalist world and internal restorationist insurgency, aided and abetted by the "pseudo-socialist gentry of the Second International," Lenin said. Workers in Britain and France and "all the advanced countries without exception" had stood up for Soviet Russia, and forced their governments to back down, bolstering the revolutionary regime, in Lenin's view, adding that this "permits us to affirm that when we in our country achieve the dictatorship of the proletariat in full measure, and the maximum unity of its forces, through its vanguard, its advanced party, we may expect the world revolution."

=== The Democratic Centralist faction ===
Despite Lenin's representation of lockstep unity as a primary cause of the Bolshevik uprising being able to sustain itself, organized factions were not at this time banned within the RKP(b). The 9th Congress is remembered for the emergence of the Democratic Centralist faction (the so-called "DC-ists" [detsisti]), headed by the delegates N. Osinsky, T.V. Sapronov, V.N. Maksimovich, K.K. Yurenev, and others.

== Decisions of the Congress ==
=== Elections during the Congress ===
There were a total of 31 people elected to the RKP(b), an increase of 4 from the previous committee. These included 19 full members and 12 "candidate" members with voice but no vote.

These were:

Full members (19)

- Andrei Andreev §
- Nikolai Bukharin ‡
- Felix Dzerzhinsky *
- Mikhail Kalinin ‡
- Lev Kamenev †
- Nikolay Krestinsky † # @
- Vladimir Lenin †
- Evgeny Preobrazhensky # @ §
- Karl Radek
- Christian Rakovsky
- Yan Rudzutak §
- Alexei Rykov # §
- Leonid Serebryakov # @
- Fëodor Sergeev (Artëm)
- Ivan Smirnov §
- Joseph Stalin † #
- Mikhail Tomsky *
- Leon Trotsky †
- Grigory Zinoviev ‡

Candidate members (12)

- Alexander Beloborodov
- Sergei Gusev §
- Matvei Muranov
- Vladimir Miliutin §
- Viacheslav Molotov §
- Viktor Nogin §
- Grigory Petrovsky §
- Osip Piatnitsky §
- Ivar Smilga
- Peter Stuchka
- Emelian Yaroslavsky
- Pëtr Zalutsky §

Note: † - denotes full member of Politburo; ‡ - denotes candidate member of Politburo. # - denotes full member of Orgburo. * - denotes candidate member of Orgburo. @ - denotes member of Secretariat. § - denotes new member of CC.
