= Zlata Lilina =

Russian official and journalist (1882–1929)

- Злата Лилина
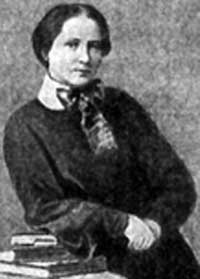
- Zlata Lilina
- Born: Zlata Evnovna Bernstein; 27 January 1882; Druya, Vilna Governorate, Russian Empire
- Died: 28 May 1929 (aged 47); Leningrad, Soviet Union
- Citizenship: Russian Empire; Soviet Union
- Occupation: Journalist
- Spouse: Grigory Zinoviev

Zlata Ionovna Lilina (27 January 1882 – 28 May 1929) was a member of the Soviet party, a state activist and a journalist. She was the second wife of Grigory Zinoviev, and the sister of Ilya Ionovich Ionov (1887–1942), the head of the State Publishing House of the Russian SFSR.

== Biography ==
She was born on 27 January [O.S. 15 January] 1882 to a poor Jewish family and was homeschooled and then studied in Mitau (now known as Jelgava). In 1902, she graduated and began working as a teacher at a four-grade school in Velizh and later in Polotsk.

In 1902, she entered medical courses at the University of Bern where she first met Grigory Zinoviev. She later tried to continue her education at the history and philology department of the Bestuzhev Courses.

She was a member of the Russian Social Democratic Labour Party (RSDLP) from 1902 and joined the Bolsheviks after the party split in 1903. While in Geneva in 1904, she participated in the congress of the RSDLP, where she met Vladimir Lenin, Alexander Bogdanov, and others.

During the First Russian Revolution in 1905, she moved to St. Petersburg and agitated among the workers of the Moscow Outpost and the Putilov Plant. In 1907, she was arrested and was briefly imprisoned in the Lithuanian Castle in St. Petersburg. After her release, she emigrated in 1908. In emigration, Lilina lived with her husband Grigory Zinoviev in Paris in 1910, then moved to Krakow in 1912, to Bern in 1914, and finally to Zurich, Switzerland.

After the February Revolution of 1917, Lilina returned to Russia from Switzerland with her husband, her son Stefan, and Sarra Ravich (Zinoviev's first wife). After returning to Russia, she became actively involved in the organization of the women's proletarian movement. Before the October Revolution, Lilina worked in the Petrograd Soviet, conducted anti-war agitation among the workers of Petrograd factories. She lived in the "Benois House".

Later, she served as the head of the Public Education Department of the Executive Committee of the Petrograd Soviet. She was a Soviet figure in the field of child welfare.

"We must remove children from the crude influence of the family. We must register them—or, to put it bluntly, nationalize them. From their very first days, they will be under the beneficial influence of Communism kindergartens and schools. There, they will learn the ABCs of Communism. There, they will grow into true Communists. Compelling a mother to surrender her child to us—to the Soviet state—that is our practical task."

— Zlata Lilina

In 1921, together with Clara Zetkin and Alexandra Kollontai, she was elected to the Presidium of the Second All-Russian Conference of Working Women, which was created at the 3rd World Congress of the Communist International.

In 1924–1926, Lilina was in charge of the Petrograd Provincial Department of Education, combining this with the leadership of the Department of Social Education. She also taught courses on the history of the party and the Comintern at the Communist University, was a professor and a member of the Council of the Institute of Social Education, and since 1925, after the unification of all pedagogical universities of the city, at the Pedagogical Institute named after Alexander Herzen.

Since 1925, she was a member of the "Leningrad", then united with the Left Opposition. The defeat of the united left opposition in Leningrad at the beginning of 1926 and the subsequent revision of the teaching staff of Leningrad universities also affected Lilina and her inner circle. In 1927, she was expelled from the party, but reinstated the following year.

After moving to Moscow, Lilina worked in the People's Commissariat for Education, and was also the head of the children's book department of the Gosizdat. She was one of the first authors of children's books about Lenin.

She died of lung cancer on 28 May 1929 and was buried in St. Petersburg at the Communist Square (now known as the Kazachye Cemetery) of the Alexander Nevsky Lavra.

== Works ==
- Who should be elected to the city councils? (1917)
- Organize the women! (1917)
- Soldiers of the Rear (Women's Labor Before and After the War) (1918)
- From the Communist Family to the Communist Society (1920)
- Social and labor education. The result of four years of work from the October Revolution to October 1921 (P., 1921)
- Six Years of the Proletarian Revolution (1923)
- The Red Calendar in the Labor School (1924)
- Our teacher Lenin (1924)
- Lenin as a Man (1924)
- School and working population. Communication experience.
- Principles and Methods (1925)
- Lenin's Pedagogical Methods (1925)
- Practice of social education. (The Experience of Leningrad and Leningrad Province) (1926)

== See also ==
- Rabotnitsa
- Communist Women's International
