= Ispolkom =

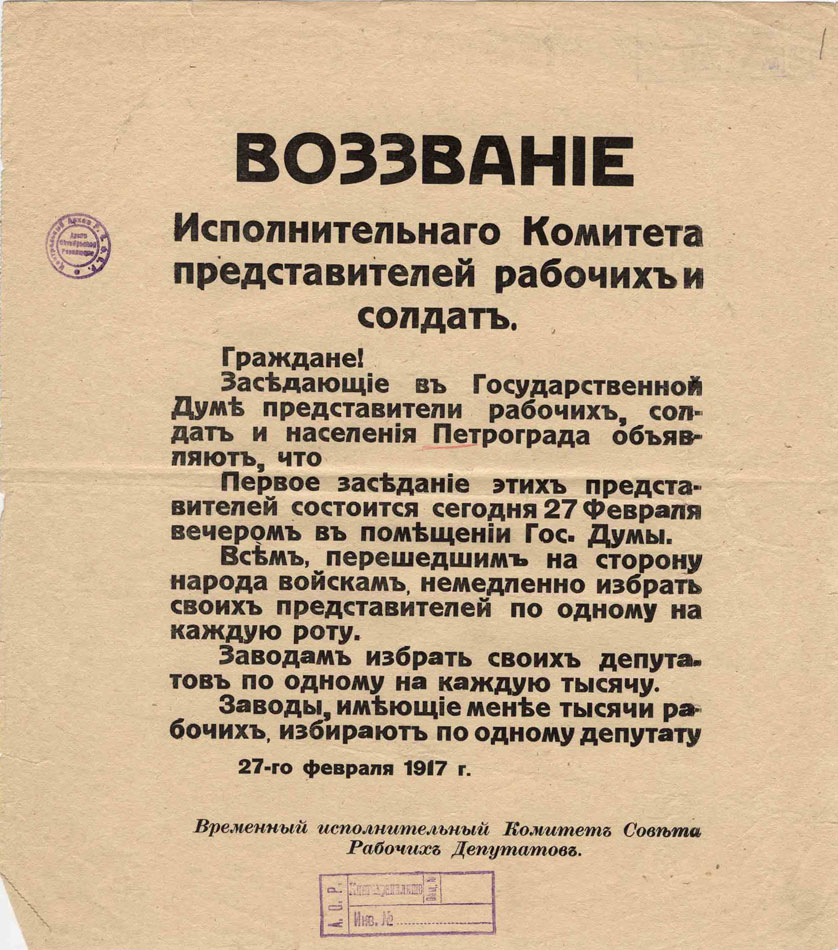
The first proclamation of the Petrograd Soviet Ispolkom after the February Revolution

Ispolkom (Russian: исполком, исполнительный комитет), literally executive committee was an executive elected collegial organ at various stages of the history of Russia and the Soviet Union.

Of early note were ispolkoms of the Russian Provisional Government in various regions of the Russian Empire after the February Revolution of 1917 and the Petrograd Soviet Ispolkom instrumental in the subsequent October Revolution of 1917. Throughout the whole history of Soviet Russia and Soviet Union ispolkoms were executive organs of soviets at all levels of state power, in particular,

- rayispolkom: ispolkom of the district (rayon) Council of People's Deputies
- gorispolkom: ispolkom of the city (gorod) council of People's Deputies
- oblispolkom: ispolkom of the oblast council of People's Deputies
- kraiispolkom:ispolkom of the krai council of People's Deputies

Before the Soviet administrative-territorial reform there also were ispolkoms in guberniyas, uyezds, volosts, etc.

The Central Executive Committee of the Soviet Union was the ispolkom of the highest level.

Ispolkoms existed in Russia in the first years after the dissolution of the Soviet Union.

Ispolkoms (Belarusian: выканкам, romanized: vykankom) continue to exist in Belarus as organs of local self-government.
