= Ben Lewis (historian) =

British historian and translator

Ben Lewis is a British historian and translator specialising in German political thought between 1871 and 1945. He has a particular interest in the disputed legacy of European social democracy and is known for English-language translations of the works of Karl Kautsky, one of the leading theoreticians of German social democracy.

== Education ==
Lewis was born in South Wales. He has a degree from Sheffield University and graduated from an MA there in 2015. His PhD research at Sheffield focused on historian and philosopher Oswald Spengler and is set to be published in book form in July 2022.

== Career ==
Lewis has worked as a political organiser and journalist. He has taught German grammar, language, translation, politics and history at the University of Sheffield, the University of Huddersfield, the Open University and King's College London.

Lewis is a member of the Communist Party of Great Britain. He is on the Revolutionary History Editorial Board and formerly served on the Marxists Internet Archive Steering Committee.

Lewis has worked on a number of collections dealing with the history of European social democracy and communism, including Clara Zetkin: Letters and Writings (with Mike Jones); Kautsky on Colonialism (with Mike Macnair); and Zinoviev and Martov: Head to Head in Halle (with Lars T Lih).

=== Writing ===
Lewis is the editor of Karl Kautsky on Democracy and Republicanism. Lewis has a particular standpoint on the legacy of Kautsky and the disdain he says has been shown by the contemporary left towards his work. Lewis partly follows the ideas of the historian Lars T Lih in stressing that VI Lenin's denunciation of the "renegade Kautsky" in 1918 counterposed him to his earlier record "when he was a Marxist". For Lewis, the pre-1914 Kautsky, "embodied the continuation of Marxism as it became a historical reality for millions of people". Lewis sees three sources for the latter-day left-wing and academic ignorance of Kautsky: the Soviet Union and former Eastern Bloc's bastardization of Marxism (and a smaller-scale Trotskyist copy); Western pro-capitalist Cold War historiography; and the neo-Hegelian interpretation of Marxism.

In relation to the issue of the 'non-revolutionary' Kautsky pictured in many secondary sources, James Muldoon argues: "Ben Lewis has done the most recent work to challenge received opinions on Karl Kautsky through the translation of a number of Kautsky's important articles with perceptive commentary on the question of democratic republicanism and socialist strategy... Lewis has brought to light Kautsky's writings on the French Revolution of 1848 and the Paris Commune in order to show that in 1905 Kautsky defended the form of the dictatorship of the proletariat along the lines of the Paris Commune and was critical of the weaknesses of the French bourgeois republic of 1848."

However, Lewis's arguments remain controversial among sections of the socialist left, who remain sceptical as to the merits of the pre-1914 Kautsky. One such correspondent argued: "... it may be correct that Lenin among others regarded Kautsky as the pre-eminent Marxist before his collapse and treachery in 1914, but surely we can't say that before 1914 Kautsky was a complete, immaculate Marxist who then, suddenly and dramatically, flipped completely and went over to the side of the class enemy. People don't 'suddenly' turn overnight: these 'turns' are usually the product of numerous quantitative and qualitative changes in thinking over long periods of time."

== Selected publications ==
- (Ed. with Lars T. Lih) Zinoviev and Martov: Head to Head in Halle (2011)
- (Ed. with Mike Macnair) Kautsky on Colonialism (2013)
- (Ed. with Mike Jones) Clara Zetkin: Letters and Writings (2015)
- (Ed. and trans.) Karl Kautsky on Democracy and Republicanism (2019)
- Oswald Spengler and the Politics of Decline (2022)
