= Bread and Authority in Russia =

Book by Lars T. Lih

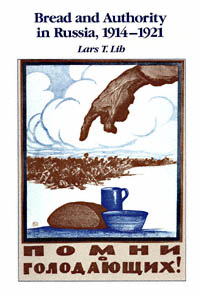
- Cover of the first edition (1990)
- Author: Lars T. Lih
- Subject: Russian history
- Published: 1990 (University of California Press)
- Pages: 303
- ISBN: 9780520065840

Bread and Authority in Russia, 1914—1921, is a history book by Lars T. Lih about the food crisis in the Russian Empire and Soviet Union (war communism).

== Description ==
In his controversial work, which was originally a PhD thesis of Lars Lih, he claims that the seven-year period he examined was the key to understanding the causes and course of the Russian Revolution. The book, containing eighteen tables, seventeen of which are in the final chapter, is intended for specialists and includes a bibliographic list useful for researchers of the Russian food crisis of the times of World War I and war communism.

== Bibliography ==
Books

- Smele, Jonathan D. (2006). The Russian Revolution and Civil War 1917-1921: An Annotated Bibliography. A&C Black. ISBN 9781441119926.
- Twiss, Thomas Marshall (2015). Trotsky and the Problem of Soviet Bureaucracy. Historical Materialism Book Series, ISSN 1570-1522, Vol. 67. Haymarket Books. ISBN 9781608464784.
- Wade, Rex A. (2004). Revolutionary Russia: New Approaches to the Russian Revolution of 1917. Routledge. ISBN 9781134397631.
- Wade, Rex A. (2005). The Russian Revolution, 1917. Cambridge University Press. ISBN 9780521841559.

Articles

- Andreyev, C. Catherine L. (1994). "Review of Bread and Authority in Russia, 1914—1921". The English Historical Review. 109 (431): 518–519. JSTOR 574173.
- Atkinson, Dorothy Grace Gillis (1991). "Review of Bread and Authority in Russia, 1914—1921". The American Historical Review. 96 (5): 1583. doi:10.2307/2165392. JSTOR 2165392.
- Borrero, Mauricio (1994). "Review of Bread and Authority in Russia, 1914—1921". Slavic Review. 53 (4): 1169–1171. doi:10.2307/2500893. JSTOR 2500893. S2CID 164437640.
- Channon, John (1992). "From Muzhik to Kolkhoznik: Some Recent Western and Soviet Studies of Peasants in Late Imperial and Early Soviet Russia". The Slavonic and East European Review. 70 (1): 127–139. JSTOR 4210868.
- Fraunholtz, Peter (1991). "Review of Bread and Authority in Russia, 1914—1921". Harvard Ukrainian Studies. 15 (1/2): 226–228. JSTOR 41036423.
- Häfner, Lutz (1991). "Review of Bread and Authority in Russia, 1914—1921. Studies on the History of Society and Culture, Band 10". Jahrbücher für Geschichte Osteuropas (in German). 39 (2): 280–283. JSTOR 41048603.
- Hickey, Michael C. (2005). "Joshua A. Sanborn. Drafting the Russian Nation: Military Conscription, Total War, and Mass Politics, 1905—1925. DeKalb: Northern Illinois University Press, 2003. x, 278 pp. $40.00". Canadian-American Slavic Studies. 39 (2–3) (Canadian-American Slavic Studies ed.): 309–311. doi:10.1163/221023905x00295. ISSN 2210-2396.
- Himmer, Robert (1994). "The Transition from War Communism to the New Economic Policy: An Analysis of Stalin's Views". Russian Review. 53 (4) (The Russian Review ed.): 515–529. doi:10.2307/130963. JSTOR 130963.
- Lavery, W. J. (April 1991). "Bread and Authority in Russia, 1914—1921". History: Reviews of New Books. 19 (4) (History: Reviews of New Books ed.): 175–176. doi:10.1080/03612759.1991.9949380. ISSN 0361-2759.
- Manning, R. T. (1992). "Review of Bread and Authority in Russia, 1914—1921". Agricultural History. 66 (2): 367–368. JSTOR 3743869.
- Tutino, John M. (1992). "Review of Communities of Grain: Rural Rebellion in Comparative Perspective". Agricultural History. 66 (2): 365–367. JSTOR 3743868.
- Offer, Avner (1992). "Review of Bread and Authority in Russia, 1914—1921". The Economic History Review. 45 (2): 441–442. doi:10.2307/2597659. JSTOR 2597659.
- Bertrand Patenaude (September 1992). "Bread and Authority in Russia, 1914—1921. Lars T. Lih, Victoria E. Bonnell, Lynn Hunt". The Journal of Modern History. 64 (3): 633–635. doi:10.1086/244544. ISSN 0022-2801.
- Bertrand Patenaude (September 1992). "Bread and Authority in Russia, 1914—1921. Lars T. Lih, Victoria E. Bonnell, Lynn Hunt". The Journal of Modern History. 64 (3) (The Journal of Modern History ed.): 633–635. doi:10.1086/244544. ISSN 0022-2801.
- Maureen Perrie (1990). "Food Supply in a Time of Troubles: Grain Procurement and the Russian Revolution". Peasant Studies Newsletter. 17 (3) (Peasant Studies ed.): 217–225. ISSN 0149-1547 – via University of Utah; University of Pittsburgh, Dept. of History.
- Rosenberg, William G. (1987). "Review of The Economic Organization of War Communism, 1918—1921". The American Historical Review. 92 (3): 712–713. doi:10.2307/1870016. JSTOR 1870016.
- Christoph Schmidt (1995). "Review of Bread and Justice. State and Society in Petrograd 1917—1922". Jahrbücher für Geschichte Osteuropas. 43 (2): 282–283. JSTOR 41052951.
- Smele, Jonathan D. (2006). "Review of Experiencing Russia's Civil War: Politics, Society and Revolutionary Culture in Saratov, 1917—1922; The Big Show in Bololand: The American Relief Expedition to Soviet Russia in the Famine of 1921". Social History. 31 (1): 118–121. JSTOR 4287315.
