= Grigory Zinoviev =

Russian revolutionary and Soviet politician (1883–1936)

- Григорий Зиновьев
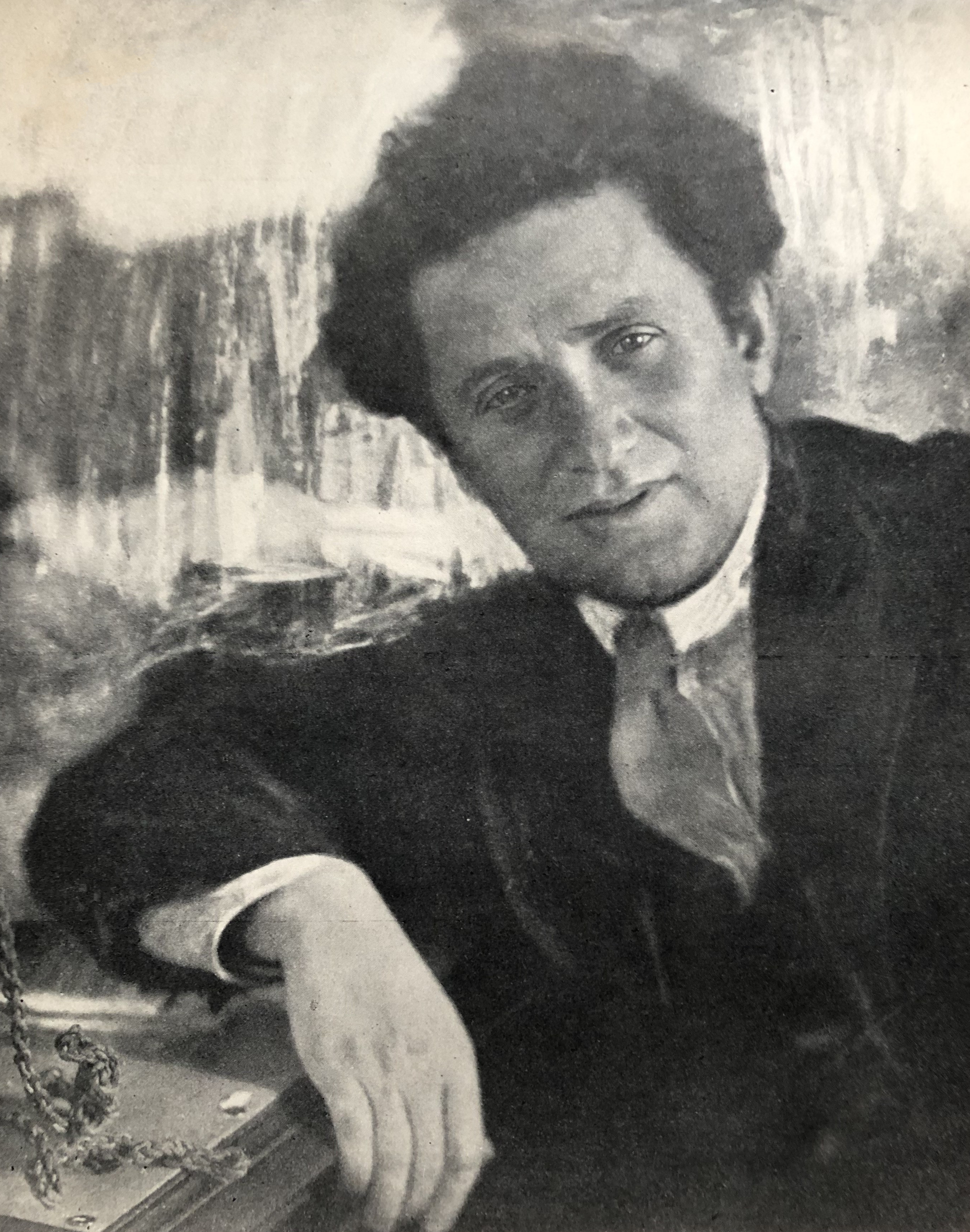
- Zinoviev c. 1920

Chairman of the Communist International
- In office March 2, 1919 – November 22, 1926
- Preceded by: Position established
- Succeeded by: Nikolai Bukharin

Chairman of the Petrograd Soviet of Worker's Deputies
- In office December 13, 1917 – March 26, 1926
- Preceded by: Leon Trotsky
- Succeeded by: Office abolished (Note: Nikolay Komarov as Chairman of the Leningrad Soviet.)

Full member of the 6th, 10th, 11th, 12th, 13th, 14th Politburo
- In office March 16, 1921 – July 23, 1926
- In office October 10, 1917 – November 29, 1917

Candidate member of the 8th, 9th Politburo
- In office March 25, 1919 – March 16, 1921

Personal details
- Born: Ovsei-Gershen Aronovich Radomyshelsky; 23 September 1883 Yelizavetgrad, Russian Empire (now Kropyvnytskyi, Ukraine)
- Died: 25 August 1936 (aged 52) (official) Moscow, Russian SFSR, Soviet Union
- Cause of death: Execution by shooting
- Party: RSDLP (1901–1903); RSDLP (Bolsheviks) (1903–1918); Russian Communist Party (Bolsheviks) (1918–1927, 1928–1932, 1933–1934)
- Spouses: Sarra Ravich; Zlata Lilina

Grigory Yevseyevich Zinoviev (Note: /zɪˈnoʊviɛf/ zin-OH-vee-ef; Russian: Григорий Евсеевич Зиновьев, romanized: Grigoriy Yevseyevich Zinov'yev, pronounced [ɡrʲɪˈɡorʲɪj‿(j)ɪfˈsʲe(j)ɪvʲɪdʑ‿zʲɪˈnovʲjɪf]. Transliterated Grigorii Evseevich Zinov'ev according to the Library of Congress system.) (born Ovsei-Gershen Aronovich Radomyshelsky; (Note: Russian: Овсей-Гершeн Аронович Радомышельский, romanized: Ovsey-Gershen Aronovich Radomyshel'skyi. This was commonly modified to "Radomyslsky". See: A. Egge, Grigory Zinoviev, p. 7.) 23 September [O.S. 11 September] 1883 – 25 August 1936) was a Russian revolutionary and Soviet politician. A prominent Old Bolshevik, Zinoviev was a close associate of Vladimir Lenin prior to 1917 and a leading figure in the early Soviet government. He served as chairman [predsedatel] of the Communist International (Comintern) from 1919 to 1926.

Zinoviev joined the Russian Social Democratic Labour Party in 1901 and sided with Vladimir Lenin's Bolsheviks in the party's 1903 split, forging a close political relationship with him. After participating in the failed Revolution of 1905, he served as Lenin's aide-de-camp in Europe.

An advocate of multi-party socialist government at the time of the October Revolution, Zinoviev joined with party moderate Lev Kamenev in opposing seizure of power by the Bolsheviks ahead of convening of the elected Constituent Assembly — in which the Bolsheviks would have been a minority. When Kamenev defended his views in a non-party radical newspaper, signing both his name and that of Zinoviev to the statement, Lenin was outraged and called for the expulsion of the pair as "strikebreakers," despite Zinoviev's condemnation of Kamenev's action.

Zinoviev subsequently lost the trust of Lenin, who began relying on Leon Trotsky as his chief associate. Zinoviev was nevertheless elected chairman of the Petrograd Soviet and the Comintern, and a full member of the Politburo in 1921.

During Lenin's final illness and after his death in 1924, Zinoviev allied with Kamenev and Joseph Stalin in a leadership "troika" against Trotsky. The arrangement fell apart, and in 1926 Zinoviev and Kamenev joined with Trotsky in the United Opposition against Stalin. Zinoviev was removed from the Politburo and Comintern in 1926 and was expelled from the party in 1927. He, like Kamenev, submitted to Stalin and rejoined the party the next year, after which he held mid-level positions. He and Kamenev were again expelled from the party in 1932, due to the Ryutin affair, and rejoined in 1933.

In 1934, Zinoviev was accused of complicity in the assassination of Sergei Kirov and was sentenced to ten years in prison. While imprisoned, Zinoviev was further accused of treason and other offenses during the Great Purge, and was executed after a show trial in August 1936.

== Biography ==
=== Early years ===
Grigory Zinoviev was born Ovsei-Gershon Aronovich Radomyshelsky (ru: Овсей-Гершон Аронович Радомышельский, simplified to Радомысльский) in Yelizavetgrad, Russian Empire (now Kropyvnytskyi, Ukraine). He was the eldest son of Jewish dairy farmers Aron and Reizy Radomyshelsky, one of nine siblings. His mother's maiden name was Rozaliya Markovna Apfelbaum, a surname which is sometimes incorrectly cited as Zinoviev's original surname.

Ovsei-Gershon's precise date of birth is uncertain. Zinoviev in one instance offered September 8 (20 new style), 1883, as his date of birth; his "official" date of birth is reckoned as September 11 (23 n.s.) of that same year, however. Working from a birth register in an ethnographic museum, the Russian historian has claimed October 29 (November 10 n.s.) as the actual birth date, while a synagogue birth register indicates a date of September 28 (October 10 n.s.). This sort of discrepancy is not uncommon for births in the Russian empire in this era, with both Joseph Stalin and Leon Trotsky similarly subject to the confusion of "official" and "actual" dates of birth.

As a boy Zinoviev was taught at home during his elementary years, a common phenomenon for Jewish families of era in the Tsarist Pale of Settlement. He later asserted that he had finished five years of formal education in Russian schools, completing the high school curriculum. He reportedly worked as a clerk for a couple large-scale merchants during his younger years.

=== Early political activity and higher education ===
Zinoviev became interested in politics at a young age, reportedly beginning to participate in radical study circles [kruzhki] in 1899 at the age of about 16. This brought him into first contact with the labor movement in Elizavetgrad, which included semi-legal trade unions and informal groups of radicalized workers. He joined the Russian Social Democratic Labour Party (RSDLP) in 1901 at the age of 17 or 18. As a member of this illegal Marxist political party he assumed the first of a series of pseudonyms, "Seraya Shapka" (Grey Cap).

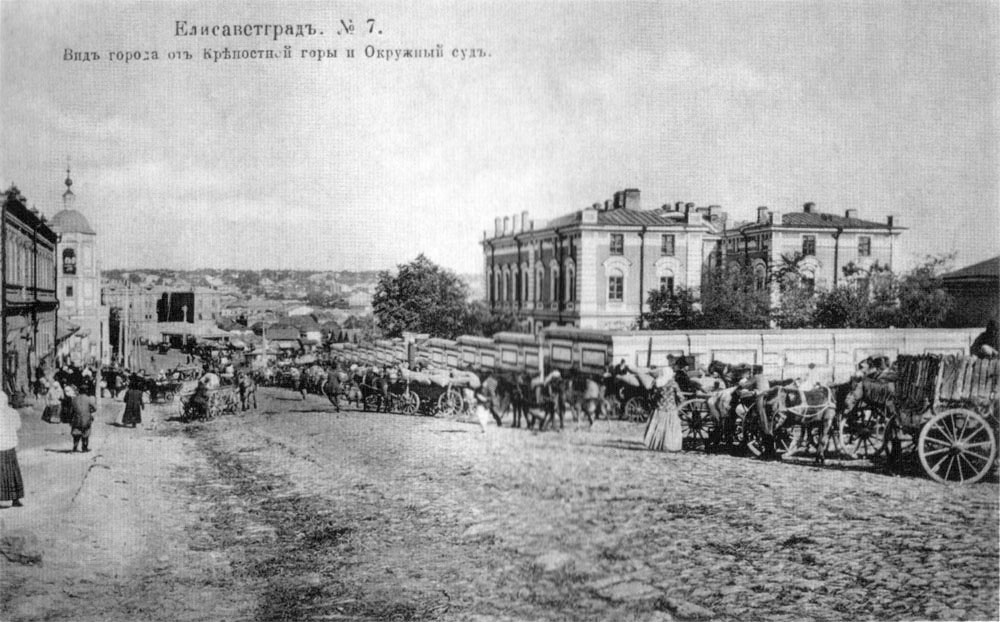
Elizavetagrad, a city of about 60,000 people, during the first years of the 20th century.

He soon gained the attention of the tsarist secret police, the Okhrana, and elected to emigrate to Western Europe in 1902, preferring the prospect of college to the prospect of prison. Briefly staying in Berlin upon his first arrival, he soon traveled to Freiburg and attempted — unsuccessfully — to gain admission to Freiburg University. After being dealt this initial academic defeat, he made his way to Bern, Switzerland — a country with liberal residence policies for foreigners and a reputation for easier access to higher education.

Zinoviev was admitted to Switzerland's largest college, the University of Bern, in the fall of 1902, joining the mass of German and Russian students who accounted for about half the university's approximately 1,000 member student body. After completing the entrance examination, Zinoviev began studying for a degree in chemistry — a somewhat perplexing and never explained choice. He later moved to the Philosophy department. Zinoviev officially, albeit dubiously, remained at the University of Bern for four years, never completing his degree.

Politics again beckoned during Zinoviev's college years. He later recalled there were three organized radical groups on campus — the "Iskra Social Democrats", the "Bund Social Democrats", and the Socialist Revolutionary Party ("SRs"). He met V.I. Ulyanov (Lenin) for the first time in November 1902 when the latter was in Bern to deliver a lecture, helping to cement his affiliation to the Iskrists. He was a member of Lenin's Bolshevik faction of the RSDLP from 1903.

Zinoviev also met his second wife during his Bern student days, partnering with Zinaida "Zlata" Lilina (party name Zina Levina), an emigre Jewish medical student two years older than he.

One who knew Zinoviev from his university days was Anatoly Lunacharsky, who moved to Geneva in 1904 to join the Bolshevik editorial team located there. Speaking on campus in Bern, Lunacharsky was less than impressed with the student he met, eight years his junior. Lunacharsky recalled in 1923:

"Radomyslsky...did not immediately strike me as very promising. He was rather a fat young man, pale and sickly, who suffered from shortness of breath and was, I thought, too phlegmatic in temperament. [His companion] Kazakov never allowed him to get a word in edgeways. However, after we had been in permanent touch with them for some time we became convinced that Radomyslsky was an efficient lad..."

Thus the Zinoviev began his career as an active organizer in the youthful Bolshevik organization, comrades and peers with such future Communist Party leaders as Lev Kamenev (born 1883), Alexei Rykov (born 1881), and provincial activist Joseph Stalin (born 1878).

=== Professional revolutionary ===
Zinoviev's first mission on behalf of the Bolsheviks came in the fall of 1903, when he was dispatched to Russia to attempt to build a party organization there. Using his hometown of Yelizavetgrad as a base of operations, Zinoviev traveled throughout the region on party assignment, including a mission to Kremenchuk, located about 65 miles to the north. He once again fell under the eye of the tsarist secret police and he was forced by this exposure to return to Bern late in 1904.

In January 1905, Zinoviev, his wife, and five others exited the joint Menshevik–Bolshevik social democratic organization in Bern and established a support group for Vperëd, the radical newspaper Lenin had launched after leaving the Menshevik-dominated Iskra. This small split-group issued a resolution explaining their decision, charging the Mensheviks with disorganizing the RSDLP and promising to fight against that tendency. A conference of the various Bolshevik city organizations in exile was held in Geneva in the middle of March of that year, and Zinoviev was elected one of five members of a coordinating committee to direct this "RSDLP overseas organization".

The Russian Revolution of 1905 having erupted in January, accompanied by a relaxation of state censorship of the press and the better opportunity for political organizing. In October, Zinoviev returned to Russia, this time to the capital city of St. Petersburg, where he joined the staff of the first legal Bolshevik newspaper, Novaya Zhizn' [New Life]. He also spoke in public on behalf of the Bolsheviks throughout the city until falling ill towards the end of the year and being forced to return to Bern to seek medical treatment.

Zinoviev did not attend either the 3rd (London) congress or the 4th (Stockholm) congress of the RSDLP, held in the spring of 1905 and 1906, respectively. He continued to work in St. Petersburg throughout 1907, taking time to attend the 5th (London) party congress in the spring of that year as one of the delegates of the Petersburg Committee. This would be the last joint congress including both the Menshevik and Bolshevik factions. Zinoviev was elected to two of the congresses' commissions and spoke to the gathering several times.

The London congress marked a turning point in Zinoviev's fortunes within the Bolshevik organization, as his oratorical skills came to the fore. His future nemesis, Leon Trotsky, then a particularly radical member of the Menshevik organization, patronizingly recalled much later:

"[A] young Petersburg delegate spoke. All had hastily left their seats and almost no one listenen to him. The speaker was obliged to mount a chair in order to attract attention. But notwithstanding these extremely unfavorable circumstances, he managed to draw an ever-growing press of delegates around him and before long the assemblage quieted down. That speech made the novice a member of the Central Committee."

Zinoviev was elected a candidate member of the RSDLP Central Committee by that 1907 congress, collecting 143 votes. More importantly, he was named to the parallel factional leadership, the so-called "Bolshevik Center". Following the congress (also attended by Caucasian delegate Joseph Stalin), Zinoviev returned to Russia, where he was a member of the Petersburg Committee and the governing "bureau" of the Bolshevik Central Committee. Although based in St. Petersburg, he traveled throughout the country on party visits, including a stay in the Ukraine, where he visited Odessa, Nikolaev, and Yekaterinoslav.

The Revolution of 1905 ground to a halt in June 1907 with the dissolution of the Second Duma by Tsar Nikolai II, and suppression of the radical press and intensified surveillance and arrest of radical activists resumed in force. Lenin left for Geneva to resume publication of the (illegal) party press there, with Zinoviev still in St. Petersburg, exchanging letters and coordinating newspaper distribution.

In addition to the Zinoviev nom de la guerra itself, at various times during his life in the revolutionary underground Zinoviev also used the pseudonyms "Zarin," "Zuev," and "Skopin."

=== First arrest and exile ===
On March 29, 1908, following a meeting of the editorial board of the Bolshevik paper Vperëd [Forward], the Okhrana picked up Zinoviev off the street and jailed him at a district police station. Despite being targeted, there was no evidence found on Zinoviev's person, nor was any evidence turned up in a subsequent raid on his home. The authorities seem not to have known of Zinoviev's status in the underground Bolshevik organization, accusing him of membership in three different illegal organizations during the interrogation process.

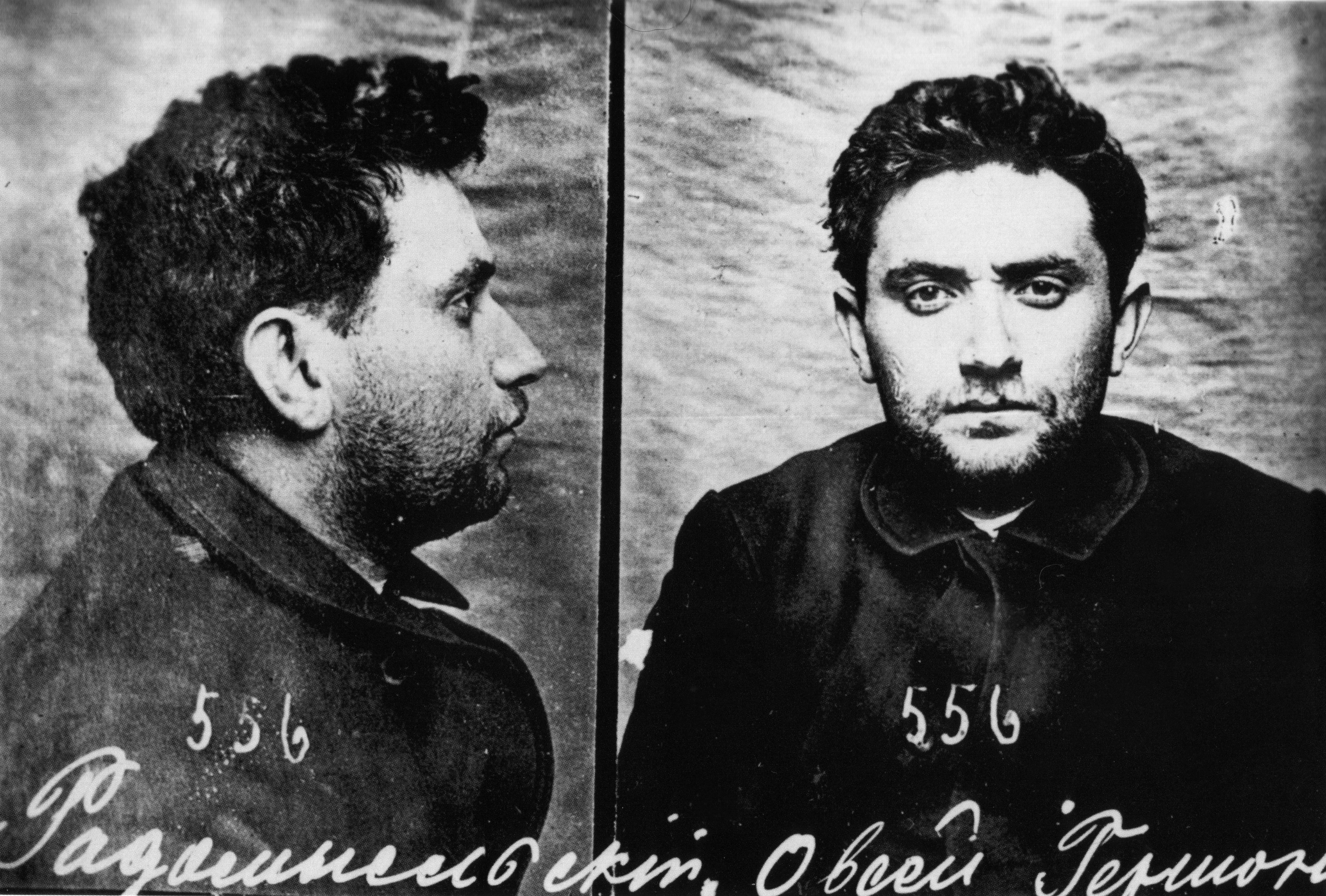
Zinoviev's Okhrana mugshot from the time of his arrest, March 1908.

His wife began a campaign for his release, with the father of Bolshevik Elena Stasova, a prosperous and prominent lawyer, among those who seem to have played a particularly important in obtaining Zinoviev's release after about two months in custody. In addition to the lack of evidence, the series of appeals to provincial authorities emphasized Lilina's pregnancy and Zinoviev's poor health in addition to the general lack of concrete evidence in the case. According to terms of his release he was given three days to leave St. Petersburg before his stint of administrative exile back to Yelizavetgrad.

With his underground position deemed compromised, Zinoviev was called to Geneva by Lenin in August 1908, where his wife gave birth to their first child, a son. Lenin and Zinoviev became close in this interval and at the end of 1908 Zinoviev and Lilina and their child followed Lenin and his wife Nadezhda Krupskaya in a coordinated relocation to Paris. Joining them in the move was Lev Kamenev (né Rozenfeld), who would become and remain a close friend and co-thinker of Zinoviev's for the rest of his life. Eventually, some 40 members of the Bolshevik organization would relocate to Paris.

In Paris Zinoviev adopted a new pseudonym, "Jean Shatsky", adding this to the names he had used for underground activity in Russia — Gregorev, Grigory, and Zinoviev. He worked as an editor of the Bolshevik factional organ, Proletarii, and was remembered by a typographer as having played the leading role in its production, allowing Lenin time for independent reading and writing. It was during this period that the pseudonym "Zinoviev" became his main signature and identity — the name being wordplay on his wife's pseudonym, "Zina".

He sided with Lenin in 1908 when the Bolshevik faction bitterly split into camps composed of Lenin's supporters and those supporting Alexander Bogdanov and he remained reliably committed to Lenin's various factional maneuvers. In the estimation of historian E.H. Carr, Zinoviev "seems to have been the only Bolshevik to stand at Lenin's side in Paris in January 1910 in opposition to the policy of compromise with the Mensheviks and to the maintenance of the united party Central Committee, and no doubt earned the leader's gratitude on that account." Zinoviev would remain Lenin's constant aide-de-camp and confidante until the Revolution of 1917.

After attending the 1910 Copenhagen Congress of the Second International together with top leaders of the Bolshevik faction Lenin, Kamenev, Lunacharsky, and Alexandra Kollontai, Zinoviev and his family relocated to the town of Longjumeau, located just south of Paris. This location was chosen for a party training school for Russian workers, presumably outside scrutiny of Parisian political intelligence officers and tsarist spies. A total of 18 students went through the school in 1911, including the Georgian Sergo Ordzhonikidze, later a key member of Joseph Stalin's inner circle. An array of party intellectuals, including Lenin, Zinoviev, and Inessa Armand, served as lecturers, with Zinoviev teaching the history of the Russian Social Democratic Labor Party.

After January 1912, there was not one RSDLP, but two, with the Bolshevik and Menshevik factions formally parting ways and establishing parallel organizations after the Prague Conference. Zinoviev was elected to the seven member Central Committee of the Bolshevik Party, and a new official organ, Rabochaya Gazeta (The Workers' Newspaper) was launched. Another party paper, Pravda (Truth), was launched in St. Petersburg in May, with Lev Kamenev the responsible editor in charge.

=== Galicia and Switzerland ===
Lenin found working in Paris to be difficult, with pervasive police surveillance and a cumbersome national library, so in the summer of 1912 he and his wife Krupskaya, together with Zinoviev and his wife Lilina, traveled to Kraków, Galicia (part of Austria–Hungary), where they rented a house together. The Zinoviev and Lenin families spent the next two summers together in Poronin, a small mountain town, before returning to Kraków each year in the fall.

Due to the physical proximity of Lenin and Zinoviev during the period of emigration, there is little documentary evidence that has survived to illuminate the personal relationship between the two. Rarely separated, almost no correspondence was exchanged by mail, save for a few brief instances when the two party leaders were vacationing in different towns. Neither left memoirs of their own, although Lenin's wife Nadya Krupskaya did publish a series of sketches, first gathered in book form as Vospominaniya o Lenine (Memoirs of Lenin) in 1926 — a work which was gradually expanded and politically "doctored" in subsequent editions of 1930, 1932, and 1934. After being mothballed for two decades, the book reissued in expanded form in 1957, published in English translation in 1960 as Reminiscences of Lenin. Little personal juice detailing the Lenin–Zinoviev exile relationship remained in this work, characterized by her biographer as a "partisan book," albeit one in which "nobody emerges as an 'enemy of the people' in the Stalinist sense."

Between the 1930 American (L) and 1931 British edition (R), Zinoviev's name was erased from the pamphlet Socialism and War [1915], co-written with Lenin.

During this period Zinoviev worked as a journalist and speechwriter for the Bolshevik organization, contributing a series of articles to the party press and writing for the party's representatives in the State Duma. Pravda would survive underground until July 1914, when it was suppressed by the Russian government and much of its staff arrested. It would be replaced by a new Bolshevik official organ, Sotsial–Demokrat, printed in Geneva and launched that same November.

The outbreak of World War I in August 1914 dramatically changed the situation for the Russian emigrant community in Galicia. As citizens of an enemy nation, Austro-Hungarian authorities cracked down on resident Russians as a security risk, with Lenin arrested on suspicion of espionage. Zinoviev and his wife were living apart from Lenin and Krupskaya in the town of Zakopane at this time, where the local authorities were less obsessed with the threat represented by anti-tsarist revolutionaries, allowing him to avoid a similar fate as that suffered by his friend and mentor.

In Russia the situation was even worse, with the Bolshevik Central Committee isolated and annihilated by secret police arrests. By 1915 only the released Lenin and Zinoviev remained, safely relocated back to Bern in neutral Switzerland. An informal conference of 19 Bolsheviks in exile was held at the end of February, electing a new coordinating committee, with Krupskaya as secretary and Armand and Lilina as members.

In the summer of 1915, Lenin and Zinoviev worked together on a joint publication dealing with the party's response to the changed international situation, a pamphlet entitled Socialism and War: The Attitude of the Russian Social Democratic Labor Party Towards the War. (Note: Early published editions clearly listed Zinoviev as a co-author, with his by-line removed from later reprints during the period of Stalin's personal rule. The editor of volume 21 of the 4th Russian edition of Lenin Collected Works acknowledges that "G.Y. Zinoviev helped write the pamphlet, though most of it was drawn up by Lenin, who, moreover, edited the entire text." (English edition, vol. 31, p. 479.)) According to Zinoviev, Lenin wrote the entire first chapter of the four chapter work and parts of chapters 3 and 4. Zinoviev wrote all of chapter 2 and parts of chapters 3 and 4. Both commented and secured changes in the manuscript written by the other.

The summer of 1915 was also largely concerned with the organization of the anti-war Zimmerwald Conference, held in early September in Zimmerwald, Switzerland. Zinoviev attended a preparatory meeting in Bern in mid-July as the official representative of the Bolsheviks and the actual conference itself. At the actual conference, Zinoviev was the chief spokesman for the revolutionary socialist "Zimmerwald Left" and it was he who summarized the conference for the Bolshevik press following its conclusion. The Zimmerwald Left continued as a loose organizational entity after conclusion of the conference, with Lenin, Zinoviev, and Polish radical Karl Radek serving as a three-person directing body in Bern, publishing its own material and pushing for convocation of a new conference.

With its underground network infested by police spies, the underground Bolshevik organization in Russia was steadily destroyed during the war years. Among her other duties, Krupskaya maintained the official party contact list of organizers in Russia, a register which included 130 names in 1916. By the end of the year only 10 of these remained outside of the Okhrana's clutches. The Central Committee in Petrograd (formerly St. Petersburg), was so wracked by successive arrests that it met rarely, wrote down virtually nothing, and tended to avoid fixed meeting locations, instead talking while walking along tree-lined suburban streets. Moreover, the party's secret press in the city was discovered and seized in December, essentially shutting down communications.

The sudden collapse of the tsarist regime in February (March new style) 1917 would seem to have been nothing short of miraculous.

=== The sealed train ===
Zinoviev was in Bern when he first saw printed confirmation that ongoing rumors of civil disturbances had proven true and had, in fact, culminated with the collapse of the 300-year old Romanov dynasty. He recalled:

"My head spun in the spring sun. I hurried home with the paper, which was not yet dry. There I found already a telegram from Vladimir Ilyich, ordering me to come 'immediately' to Zurich."

A committee of the Duma had decided to take power the evening of February 27 (March 12 n.s.), 1917, but it took three more days for a provisional government of the Russian Republic to emerge. Dominated by mild constitutionalists who distrusted and feared the possibility of wild popular unrest, two socialists from the Petrograd Soviet were co-opted into the new central authority — vice-chair Alexander Kerensky and Nikolai Chkheidze, a top figure in the Menshevik party and president of the Soviet's Executive Committee.

Transit map showing the route traveled Lenin and Zinoviev back to Russia on the "sealed train" following the February Revolution.

Russian radicals of all stripes who had fled tsarist persecution to neutral Switzerland were anxious to make an expeditious return to their homeland with the emergence of a democratic republic, but found themselves trapped by the ongoing European war. Great Britain and France, allies with Russia in the ongoing bloodbath against Germany and Austria–Hungary, prohibited anti-war Russian radicals from passage through their lines, although they did provide pro-war radicals such as Georgii Plekhanov and Pëtr Kropotkin safe passage. Frustration grew among the anti-war Russian left.

On March 19 (n.s.) a meeting of Russian and Polish émigrés allied with the anti-war Zimmerwald movement held a meeting in Bern to discuss the transit situation. Iulii Martov, a top leader of the anti-war "Internationalist" faction of the Mensheviks, suggested the possibility of moving from Switzerland through Germany to non-combatant Sweden, and from there to Russia. Zinoviev was tapped for membership on a committee of four to work out the details of this program.

Springing from this was a new organization, the Central Swiss Committee for the Return of Political Émigrés to Russia, based in Zurich and including representatives from a wide array of otherwise antagonistic organizations, including the Bolsheviks, Mensheviks, Party of Socialist Revolutionaries, Social Democracy of the Kingdom of Poland and Lithuania, the Polish Socialist Party, the Armenian Revolutionary Federation, anarcho-communists, and a host of other anti-war publications and Swiss relief organizations. Lenin was dissatisfied with the pace of progress by this united Émigré Committee, however, and decided to pursue repatriation on his own. At the end of March he sent out a message to all adherents of the Bolshevik Party who wished to return home to make contact with him.

Lenin, Zinoviev, Swiss radical Fritz Platten, and German Willi Münzenberg formed a committee of four to negotiate exact details of transit. Germany had every interest in destabilizing the new government of Russia and the German envoy in Bern, Gisbert von Romberg, quickly acceeded to Lenin's list of rules governing the transfer, seeking approval from Berlin on April 5 (n.s.). The so-called sealed train was to have the status of an extraterritorial entity, with the neutral Swiss citizen Platten to act as the point of contact between the Russian travelers and their German guards. No one was to enter the cars occupied by the Russians without permission. The train was to travel without stopping, if practicable, and no passports or visas were to be used, no discrimination exhibited against individual travelers for their political views, and no passengers to be forcefully disembarked from the train. These terms were approved.

On Monday, April 9, Lenin and Krupskaya, Zinoviev and Lilina and their son, and 27 others assembled at a hotel outside the main railway station in Zurich to embark. Others making the trip were Inessa Armand, reckoned by some historians to have been Lenin's former lover, and the gregarious Olga Ravich (party name: Sara Savvich), who had briefly been married to Zinoviev. Also making the journey were Bolshevik Georgii Safarov and his wife as well as the Karl Radek, technically an Austrian citizen and thus ineligible to cross into Russia. The party held a spirited luncheon at the hotel, with Lenin delivering a fire-breathing revolutionary speech to those assembled. Following lunch, the 30 adults and 2 children boarded the train for departure, only to have the light meals they had packed removed by Swiss authorities in accord with a wartime regulation prohibiting the export of foodstuffs.

Sweden was persuaded to allow transit of the Russians only after the train had departed from Switzerland. Radek, burdened by his Austrian citizenship, was left in Stockholm to engage in party work there. The party proceeded into Finland, a semi-autonomous part of the Russian empire on its way to full independence after the fall of the Romanovs, where Lenin obtained issues of Pravda that informed him of the situation ahead, and news of the train's schedule was telegraphed ahead and a welcome party arranged. On April 16 (n.s.), the train carrying Lenin and his trusted right-hand man, Zinoviev, pulled into the station in Petrograd, with the party leader immediately issuing a call for a broader social revolution. The next phase of the Russian Revolution had begun.

=== The "July Days" ===
The fatal error of the rapid succession of Provisional Governments of Russia was remaining engaged in the European military bloodbath amidst total economic and social collapse. Head of the first government, the Constitutional Democrat Pavel Miliukov was heartened by American entry into the war in April and considered the popular slogan of "peace without annexations" to be a "German formula." A declaration of April 10 (n.s.) continued to advance the line that "the defense of our own inheritance by every means, and the liberation of our country from the invading enemy, constitute the foremost and most urgent task of our fighters, defending the nation's liberty." As the bodies of fallen soldiers continued to stack, tension between the self-appointed Provisional Government and the parallel system of elected councils (Soviets) continued to mount.

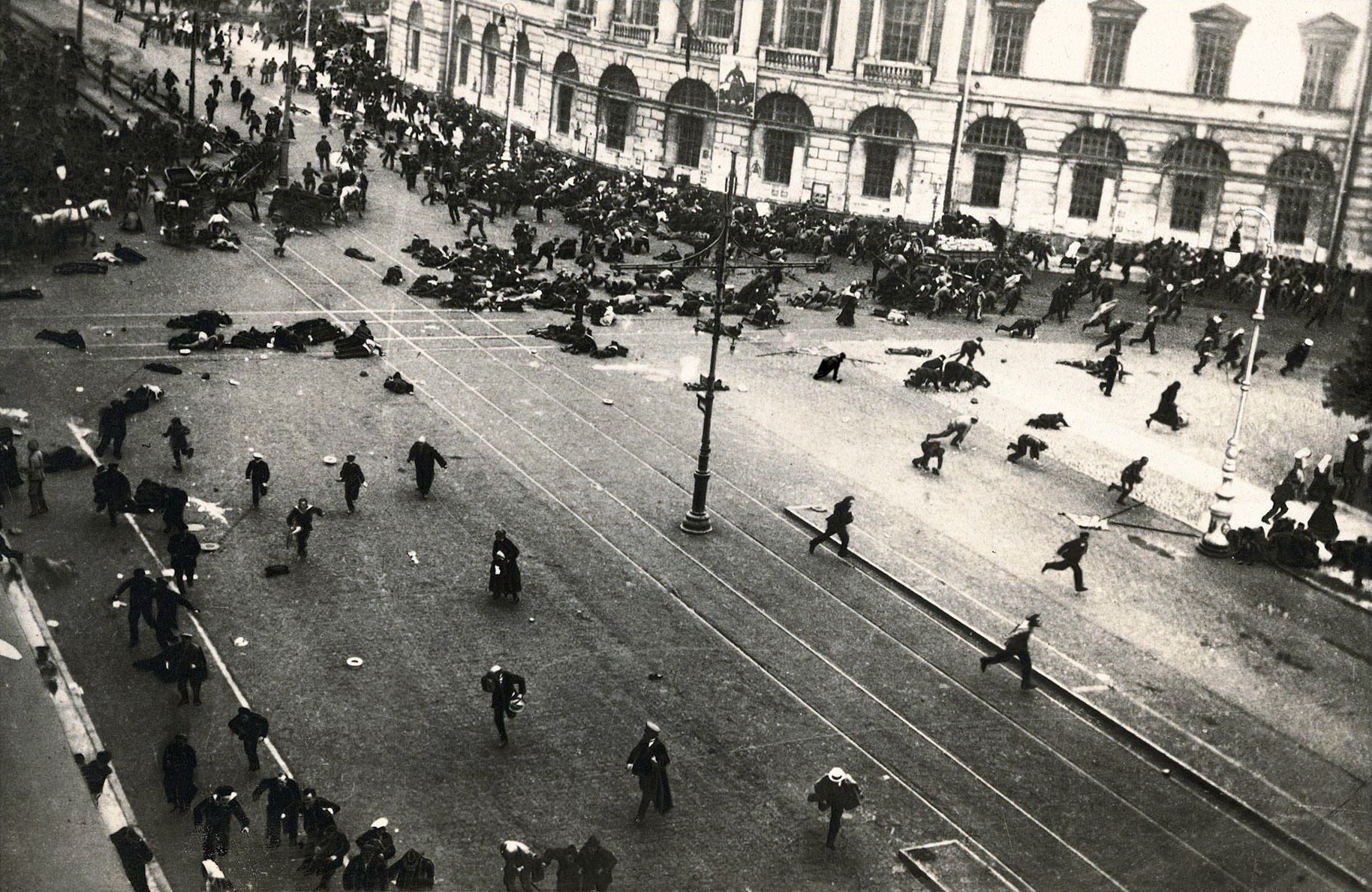
Protesters come under attack during the "July Days" melee, Petrograd, July 4 (17), 1917.

The afternoon of July 3, 1917, a group of largely spontaneous demonstrations broke out around Petrograd — soldiers opposing transfer to the front and workers protesting against unmet wage promises and food speculation. While more radical elements of the Bolshevik Party, such as its Military Organization, actively supported the street revolt against the government, the party's central leadership headed by Lenin and Zinoviev, sought to quell the disturbances, anxious to wait for a more opportune moment after the government's military offensive had failed convincingly, in a manner that absolved the Bolsheviks from any possible blame. Lenin was briefly away from the city on a short vacation, however, leaving Zinoviev to play an oversized role in attempting to stabilize and steer the "July Days" revolt.

With 30,000 angry workers out from the Putilov factory and thousands of sailors en route from the Kronstadt naval base nearby, Zinoviev and the central committee determined to authorize and lead a "peaceful yet armed" demonstration in Petrograd the following day. As many as half a million people filled the streets, with snipers taking a toll on protesters from surrounding buildings. At a meeting of the Petrograd Soviet the evening of July 4, Zinoviev advocated a middle course, in favor of the Petrograd Soviet taking power immediately while simultaneously attempting to end the riotous situation on the streets. When an unruly throng congregated outside the Tauride Palace calling for Irakli Tsereteli, a Menshevik and top leader in the Provisional Government, it was Zinoviev who stepped forward to deliver a lengthy impromptu speech to the tens of thousands assmbled, ending with a successful call for the mob to peacefully disperse.

From the afternoon of July 4, the Provisional Government went on a propaganda offensive against the Bolsheviks, blaming them for agitating and organizing the two days of urban disorder and making the claim that Lenin and Zinoviev were actually German agents, sent by the Imperial government on the sealed train to overthrow the Russian Revolution and return the citizens of the nation to the thrall of capitalism. The propaganda campaign against the Bolsheviks, with troops loyal to the government sacking the party's offices and printing ship and public sentiment turning decisively against the radicals. Arrest warrants were issued on July 6 with Lenin, Zinoviev, and other top leaders ordered to surrender.

Although Lev Kamenev, Alexandra Kollontai, and other top leaders surrendered in subsequent days, seeking to raise public support for their cause through a sensational trial defense, Lenin and Zinoviev, facing potential lynching as German spies given the hysterical situation, instead had their hair cropped and were disguised and spirited off to the relative safety of neighboring Finland. Lenin was made up to look like a Finnish peasant, while Zinoviev was outfitted in a "wide, light-colored coat with a multi-colored pattern" to look like a prosperous Baltic trader. They quickly departed to the village of Razliv, where a local Bolshevik, an old friend of Lenin's, was originally planned to help them cross the border on a late night train. Instead the pair spent several summer weeks camping out a hastily constructed leaf hut that Lenin's friend had built for them.

The pair spent their time idyllically — walking, swimming, reading, and writing. It was in Razliv that Lenin finished up one of his best remembered books, started the previous year in Switzerland, The State and Revolution. Ultimately, bad weather ended the camping expedition and Lenin and Zinoviev split up, with Lenin traveling to Helsinki disguised as an engine-stoker aboard a train while Zinoviev remained in hiding in the apartment of a factory worker on the outskirts of Petrograd.

=== Zinoviev in October ===
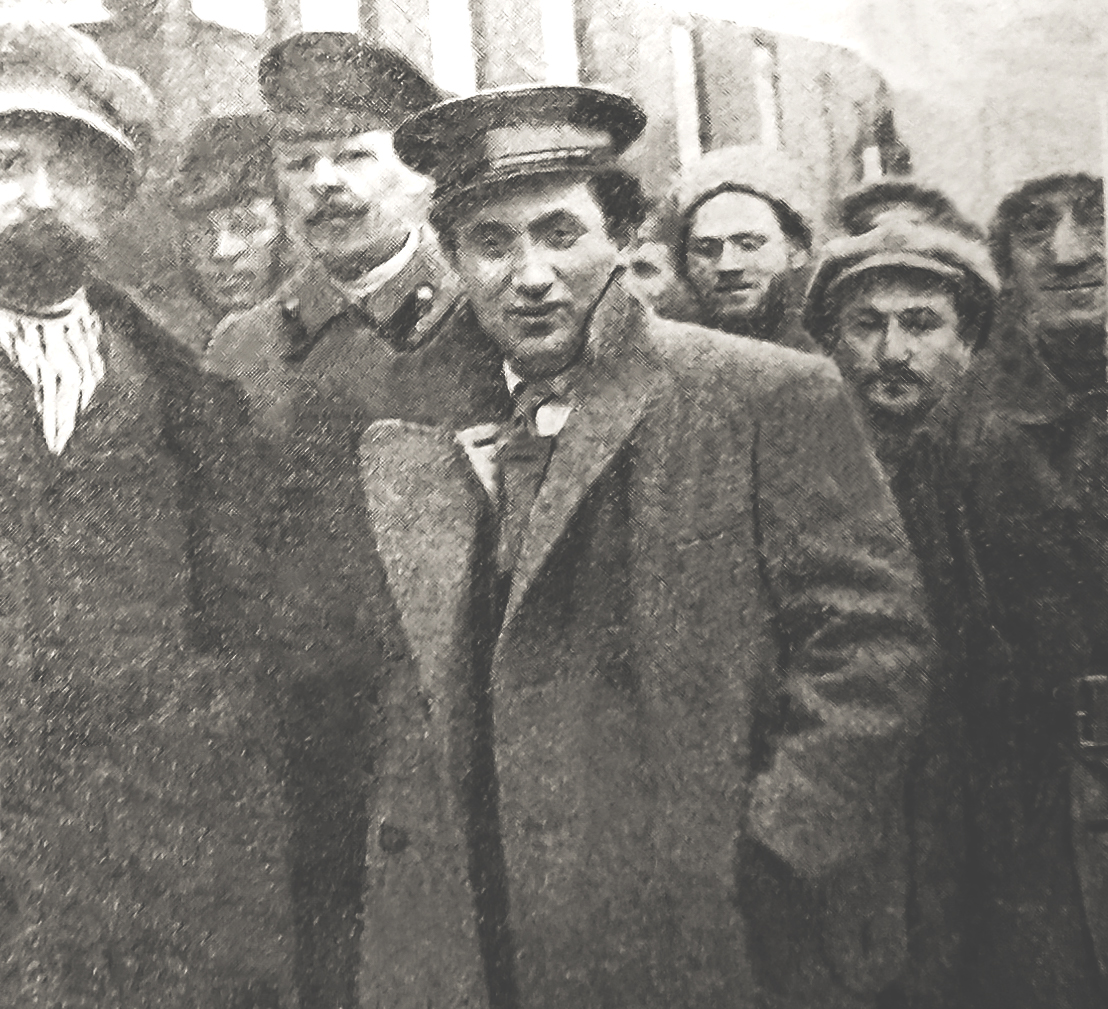
Zinoviev, Chairman of the Petrograd Soviet, among the Political Commissars in 1918

Despite Zinoviev's almost lockstep adherence to Lenin's sometimes dramatic changes of political tactics, at a critical meeting of the Bolshevik Central Committee in October 1917 he dug in his heels and joined the consistently cautious Lev Kamenev in opposing Lenin's call for open insurrection against the Provisional Government.

Zinoviev and Kamenev felt that the new wave of popular support for the Bolsheviks following the defeat of the attempted coup by Kornilov was unreliable. Moreover, they argued, successful alliances had been formed during the Kornilov insurrection with other radical parties; the Constituent Assembly, an institution bearing authority with the public at large, should therefore be the focus of Bolshevik efforts instead of an attempt at armed seizure of power. While he did not resign his position on the committee over the matter, when the dispute was reported in the non-party radical newspaper Novaya Zhizn [New Life], headed by novelist Maxim Gorky, Lenin was enraged.

Rumors of Bolshevik planning of an armed insurrection against the provisional government had been widespread for some days in Petrograd. On October 17 (30), one day after the key meeting of the central committee that had divided over the matter, Gorky reported that two top Bolsheviks had opposed armed action. This was followed with publication on October 18 (31) of a statement by Kamenev in the same newspaper by Kamenev — with Kamenev signing both for himself and for Zinoviev — in which he defended his perspective. Zinoviev condemned this action by Kamenev, asserting that he had not authorized the latter to act in his name, making this declaration verbally on October 19 (Nov. 1) and in writing the following day.

Lenin nevertheless continued to believe that Zinoviev was intent upon sabotaging the central committee's decision and called for action against both as "strikebreakers," demanding their expulsion from the party, in letters to the party membership and to the central committee. The Bolshevik central committee met on October 20 (Nov. 2) to discuss the matter, Lenin not attending, but decided not to pursue action against either Kamenev or Zinoviev for the breach of discipline of airing of confidential party laundry in a non-party publication.

On October 25 and 26 (Nov. 7 and 8), the Bolsheviks deposed the Provisional Government, transferring power to the Congress of Soviets. Zinoviev's contribution was modest, including articles written for the Bolshevik official organ, Rabochii Put, which replaced Pravda after its ban in July, attending central committee meetings, and speaking with Lenin at the October 25 (Nov. 7) meeting of the Petrograd Soviet.

Ten days after the Bolshevik seizure of power, Zinoviev and Kamenev — together with Alexei Rykov, Vladimir Milyutin, and Victor Nogin — resigned their places on the central committee over the decision to exclude Left SRs (essentially an independent party from the regular Party of Socialist Revolutionaries) from the government. Lenin responded to this political protest with an ultimatum; only Zinoviev renounced his decision and resumed his seat on the Central Committee, effectively ending his rebellion. This failure to adhere to the party line during the most critical moments of the revolution would remain a black cloud on the horizon for the rest of Zinoviev's political career, an "October episode" recalled by Lenin in his so-called "political testament".

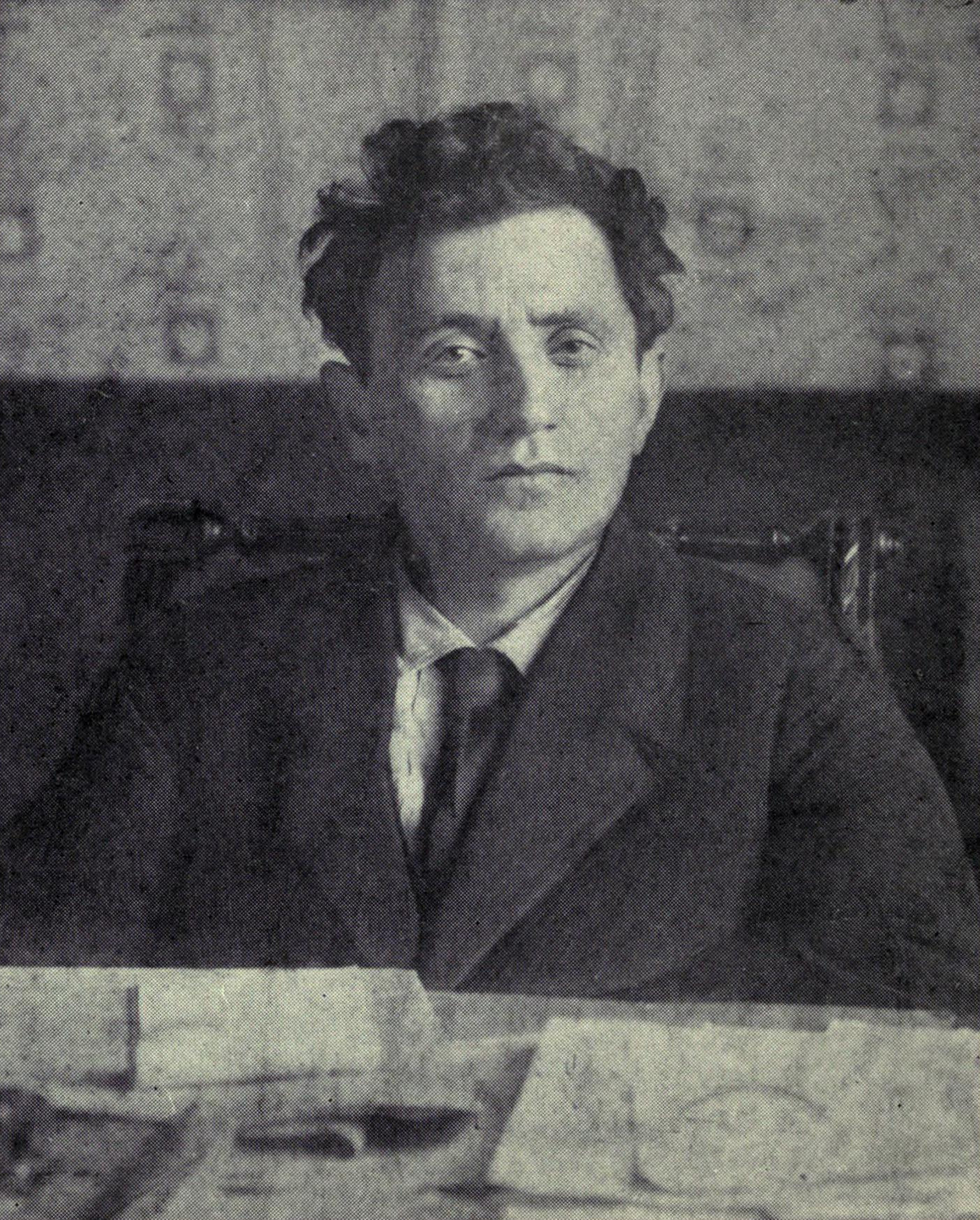
Zinoviev c. 1918

In the immediate aftermath of the October Revolution, a great debate erupted in Bolshevik party councils over the parameters of the government that would follow. Lenin and Trotsky represented a hardline faction, rejecting negotiation with Menshevik and Right SR leaders to form a multi-party socialist government, instead hoping to instigate "immediate decisive socialist revolutions in the more advanced countries of Europe by means of a big revolutionary bang in Russia. Zinoviev aligned himself with Bolshevik moderates, headed by Lev Kamenev and including such party worthies as Alexei Rykov, Anatoly Lunacharsky, and David Riazanov, in efforts to negotiate with the powerful Menshevik- and SR-dominated All-Russian Executive Committee of the Union of Railway Workers (Vikzhel) and other unions to establish a multi-party government.

An eloquent defense of the perspective of moderates was made by A. Lozovsky at a November 17 (n.s.) meeting of the All-Russian Central Executive Committee of Soviets (CEC), considered the supreme governmental authority in the days after the revolution. Lozovsky charged the hardliners, operating through the Military Revolutionary Committee, with incitement of mob violence, restricting democracy through suppression of the opposition press, conducting persecution through arbitrary searches and arrests, and for deceiving the will of the masses by usurping civil governance in favor of rule by one party whose delays in governmental restructuring resulted only in a continuation of mob violence.

In the immediate aftermath of this heated December 17 meeting, Lenin sent a personal ultimatum to four Bolshevik Central Committee members associated with the moderates — Kamenev, Zinoviev, Riazanov, and Yuri Larin — threatening them with expulsion from the party unless they immediately submitted a written declaration promising to unflinchingly uphold the decisions of the Central Committee and to either promote its line or to withdraw from all public activity pending the final decision of the next party congress. Zinoviev as the only one of the four to take this threatening reprimand in silence, with Kamenev and his peers jointly pronouncing Lenin's demand an unprecedented demand to stifle a party member's freedom of conscience.

Kamenev was shortly replaced as head of the Central Executive Committee of Soviets by Bolshevik hardliner Yakov Sverdlov, whose rigid adherence to the Bolshevik line contributed to the atrophy of that committee as the chief decision-making institution, to be supplanted by the Council of People's Commissars (Sovnarkom), a formerly inferior body. Zinoviev, on the other hand, by breaking with Kamenev and the moderates and bending the knee to the hardline Central Committee of the party, found himself immediately back in the good graces of Lenin and the party majority.

Though lasting political damage remained, these transgressions were passed over unremarked, as it was a situation calling for all hands on deck for the Bolsheviks during the revolutionary period and the bitter civil war that followed. As Carr phrased it:

"These incidents were forgiven and, in large measure, forgotten by the party. But they left the impression of a basic timidity of character beneath a blustering exterior. Zinoviev shrank from the responsibility of decisive action, but shrank equally from the consequences of persisting in his opposition."

Zinoviev's initial ministerial portfolio was that of chief party representative in the trade union central council — this during a period when many unions were dominated by the Mensheviks. In this capacity, Zinoviev presided at several early congresses of trade unions. He also worked closely with the union of metal workers, the core of Bolshevik support in the trade union movement.

Zinoviev was an opponent of the party's decision to move the capital to Moscow in March 1918, and received permission to remain in Petrograd as the head of the party organization there. Petrograd (later renamed Leningrad, today's St. Petersburg) would remain the urban base of Zinoviev's authority throughout his career.

=== Zinoviev in the Civil War (1918–1920) ===
Zinoviev soon returned to the fold and was once again elected to the Central Committee at the VII Party Congress on 8 March 1918. He was put in charge of the Petrograd (Saint Petersburg before 1914, Leningrad 1924–91) city and regional government.

Sometime in 1918, while Ukraine was under German occupation, the rabbis of Odessa ceremonially anathematized (pronounced herem against) Trotsky, Zinoviev, and other Bolshevik leaders of Jewish descent in the synagogue. (Note: Zinoviev sarcastically referred to this in his eulogy of Moisei Uritsky (the chief of the Petrograd Cheka, assassinated on 30 August 1918): "When we read that in Odessa, under Skoropadsky, the rabbis assembled in special council, and there these representatives of the rich Jews, officially, before the entire world, excommunicated from the Jewish community such Jews as Trotsky and me, your obedient servant, and others – no single hair of any of us has turned gray because of grief"; Zinoviev, Sochineniia [Works], vol. 16, p. 224; quoted in Bezbozhnik [The Godless], no. 20 (12 September 1938).)

Shortly after the assassination of Petrograd Cheka leader Moisei Uritsky in August 1918 and the commencement of the five-year Red Terror period of political repression and mass killings, Zinoviev said:

To dispose of our enemies, we will have to create our own socialist terror. For this we will have to train 90 million of the 100 million Russians and have them all on our side. We having nothing to say to the other 10 million; we'll have to get rid of them.

He became a non-voting member of the ruling Politburo when it was created after the VIII Congress on 25 March 1919. He also became the Chairman of the Executive Committee of the Comintern when it was created in March 1919. It was in this capacity he presided over the Congress of the Peoples of the East in Baku in September 1920 and gave his famous four-hour speech in German at the Halle congress of the Independent Social Democratic Party of Germany in October 1920.

Zinoviev was responsible for Petrograd's defence during two periods of intense clashes with White forces in 1919. Trotsky, who was in overall charge of the Red Army during the Russian Civil War, thought little of Zinoviev's leadership, which aggravated their strained relationship.

=== Comintern leader ===
Grigory Zinoviev is best remembered as the first president [predsedatel] of the Communist International (Comintern), holding that position since the organization's formation in 1919 until being removed some time shortly after the enlarged plenum of the Executive Committee of the Communist International (ECCI) held in February–March 1926.

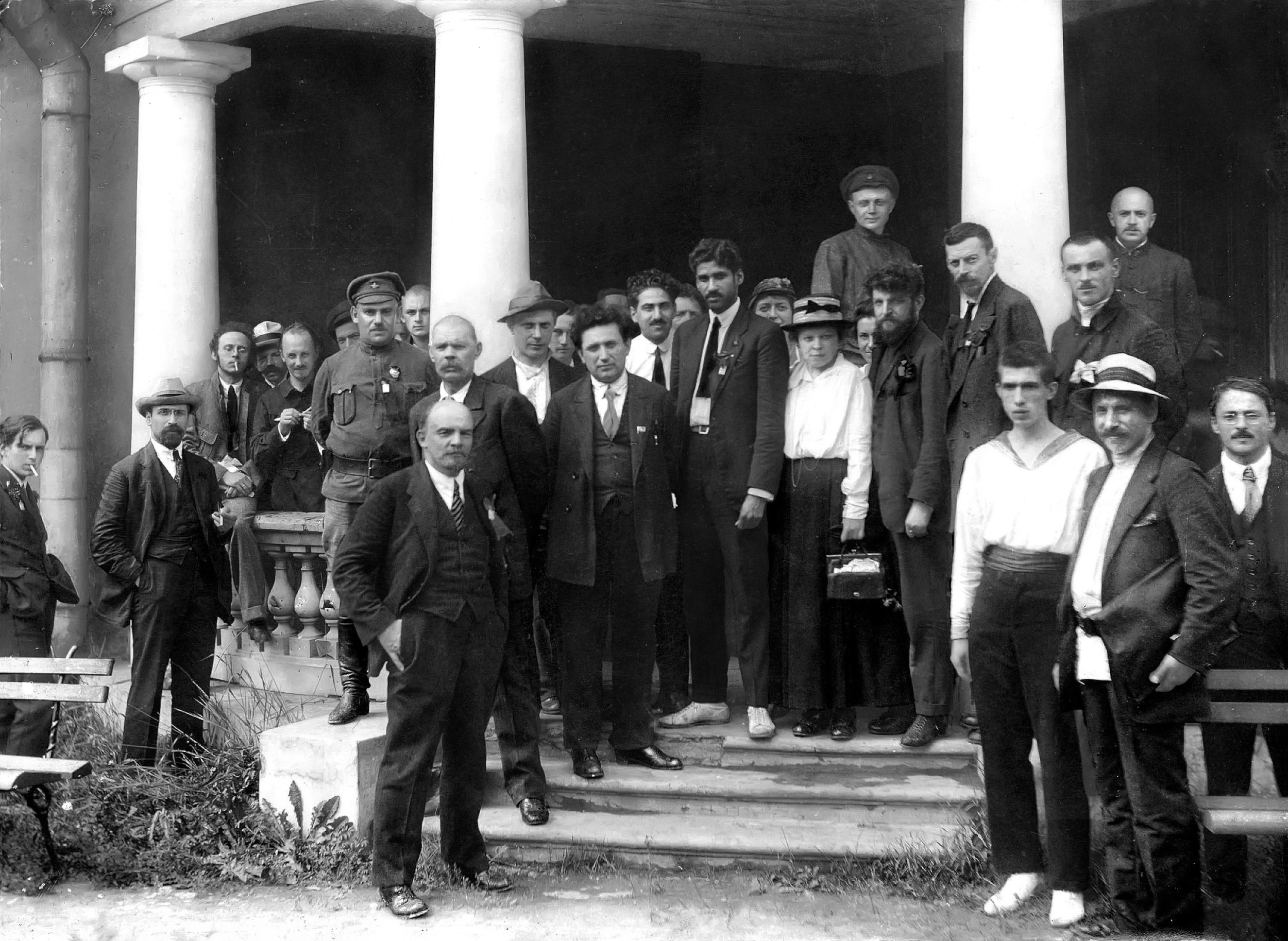
Grigory Zinoviev and Vladimir Lenin among the delegates to the second congress of the Comintern at the Uritsky Palace in Petrograd, 1920

Zinoviev was a logical choice to head the Comintern, having been active as he was in the international Zimmerwald movement during the war. With the success of socialist revolution in peasant Russia seemingly bound to the rapid achievement of revolution in the industrialized West, Zinoviev's position as Comintern chief was one of enormous prestige and authority, further cementing his position as one of the top leaders of the Russian Communist Party.

The Founding Congress of the Comintern was a small and informal affair, held during the first week of March 1919. There were 52 people who participated, but only 12 were officially delegated representatives of radical political organizations, with perhaps 8 of these being representatives of the Russian Communist Party.

Joining Lenin and Zinoviev on this delegation to the founding convention were top leaders Leon Trotsky, Nikolai Bukharin, Georgy Chicherin, Vatslav Vorovsky, N. Osinsky, and perhaps Joseph Stalin, listed as a delegate but leaving no evidence of having actually participated. The blockade of Soviet Russia made attendance extremely difficult in the best case; others participated informally or without formal credentials, delegates by virtue of felicitously having been present in Moscow at the right moment.

Lenin spoke to open the gathering and Zinoviev conveyed the formal greetings of the Central Committee of Russian Communist Party, indicative of the relative positions of pair in the party hierarchy.

In the aftermath of the gathering Zinoviev squabbled with Angelica Balabanoff, who had served as secretary at the founding convention and who was among the small circle of individuals who helped to establish the Comintern's organization form, hosting initial meetings of ECCI in her Moscow living quarters until more permanent facilities could be maintained. As a result of these quarrels, Zinoviev established a parallel headquarters for the Comintern at the Smolny Institute in Petrograd, from which the organization issued its publications. The Smolny building was also used by Zinoviev as his headquarters as chair of the Petrograd Soviet, allowing him to retain and consolidate authority in both organizations.

One of the main functions of the Comintern was Bolshevization, whereby the proletarian revolution was postponed, and an emphasis was put on unconditional support for the Kremlin's foreign policy. This policy, formalized at the Fifth Comintern Congress in 1924 during Zinoviev's tenure as chairman, required foreign communist parties to restructure their internal organization to mirror the Russian Bolshevik model, prioritizing strict discipline and loyalty to Moscow. The Comintern closely supervised many national parties, and reorganized them along Soviet lines, with a hefty dose of Soviet political rhetoric as well.

=== Rise to the top (1921–1923) ===
In early 1921, when the Communist Party was split into several factions, and policy disagreements were threatening the unity of the Party, Zinoviev supported Lenin's faction. As a result, Zinoviev was made a full member of the Politburo after the 10th Party Congress on 16 March 1921, while members of other factions, such as Nikolai Krestinsky, were dropped from the Politburo and the Secretariat.

Zinoviev was one of the most influential figures in the Soviet leadership during Lenin's final illness in 1922–23 and immediately after his death in January 1924, joining with Lev Kamenev and Joseph Stalin to form a three-person triumvirate, sometimes referred to by the Russian word for a three horse sleigh, a troika. Zinoviev reportedly marshalled Stalin's candidacy for general secretary of the Communist Party at the 11th Party Congress in 1922, a move intended to help entrench a close associate in a position of authority.

First among equals in this period, Zinoviev delivered the Central Committee's reports to the 12th and 13th Party Congresses in 1923 and 1924, respectively. These keynote address always previously delivered by Lenin. He was also considered one of the Communist Party's leading theoreticians.

Trotsky attributed Stalin's appointment to the initial recommendation of Zinoviev. This view has been supported by several historians. According to Russian historian Vadim Rogovin, Stalin's election occurred after the 11th Party Congress, held at the end of March through early April 1922) in which Lenin, due to his poor health, participated only sporadically.

=== The leadership struggle accelerates ===
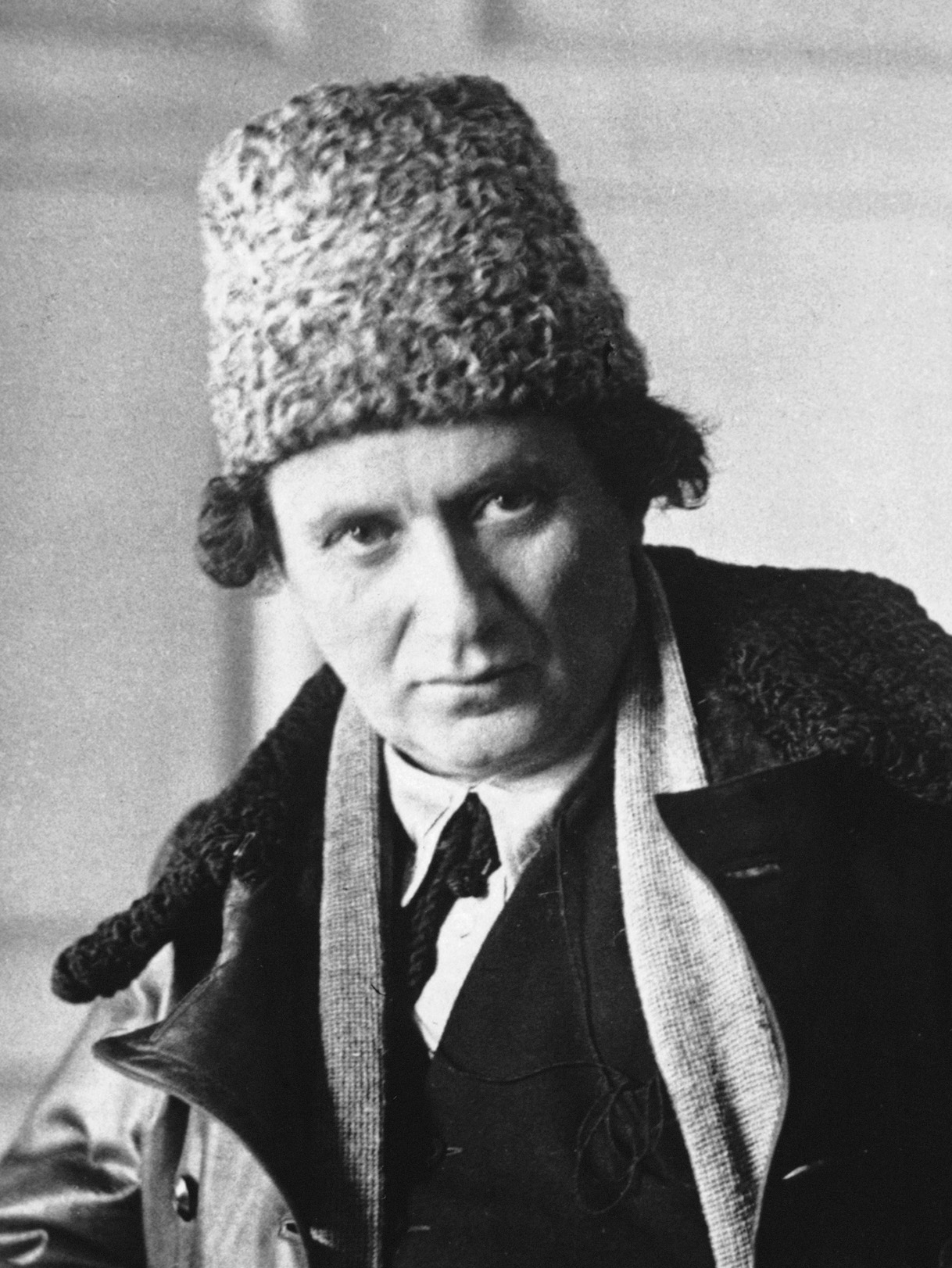
Zinoviev in 1920

On March 9, 1923, Lenin suffered a second severe stroke, pushing the leadership of the Russian Communist Party into an even deeper flux. Zinoviev, Kamenev, and Stalin represented a majority on the Politburo, effectively making joint decisions as a triumvirate, with Trotsky isolated as a minority; the time was not ripe for an outright break, however, since the possibility of Lenin's full recovery remained possible while policy differences between the two groupings on industrial and agricultural policy not yet completely defined. The annual congress of the Russian Communist Party, scheduled for March 1923, was postponed until April 17 due to leadership turmoil associated with Lenin's sudden health setback.

During this interval, Zinoviev was the first among equals, the de facto leader of the party, head of the world communist organization, and the apparent heir to Lenin's chair.

Zinoviev and Trotsky immediately began to jockey for position to succeed Lenin after his latest health crisis, the two most logical candidates for the chief executive function. Zinoviev prepared a series of six lectures which he delivered early in 1923, reviewing the history of the Bolshevik party from its foundation down to February 1917. These were collected and released as a short book, The History of the Russian Communist Party (Bolsheviks), eventually translated into English.

Trotsky possessed an outstanding mind and years of total commitment to the revolutionary cause, but was for years an outsider to the Bolshevik Party and owed his position of power to some great extent to Lenin's personal patronage. However, Zinoviev, Lenin's closest associate for a decade, and Trotsky, Lenin's persistent opponent, shared a deep personal animus which accentuated their frequent policy disagreements.

Trotsky was particularly concerned about policies fostering capitalism in the countryside and began to take an more aggressive line in developing the planning process and committing financial support to industry. Zinoviev, for his part, sought an end to debilitating rates of inflation through a stable currency and favored a continued effort to rebuild the economy in the countryside through the New Economic Policy (NEP) program of moderation of tax rates and combination of various existing fees into a single agricultural tax.

Trotsky's report on industry to the 12th congress noted an escalation of the real price of industrial goods compared to the real price of agricultural commodities — the emergence of "price scissors" that would grow to become one of the main economic problems facing the Soviet government in the coming year. He did not declare this an insurmountable crisis or propose radical structural changes, however, and the 1923 party conclave effectively ratified the comparatively moderate, pro-peasant policies advocated by Zinoviev, Kamenev, and Stalin.

The triumvirate carefully managed the intra-party debate and delegate-selection process in autumn 1923, during the run-up to the 13th party conference, and secured the vast majority of the seats. The conference, held in January 1924 just before Lenin's death, denounced Trotsky and Trotskyism. Some of Trotsky's supporters suffered demotion or reassignment in the wake of his defeat, and Zinoviev's power and influence seemed at its zenith.

After Trotsky's defeat at the 13th Conference, tensions between Zinoviev and Kamenev, on the one hand, and Stalin on the other became more pronounced and threatened to end their alliance. Nevertheless, Zinoviev and Kamenev helped Stalin retain his position as General Secretary of the Central Committee at the 13th Party Congress in May–June 1924 during the first Lenin's Testament controversy.

The 13th Congress marked the zenith of Zinoviev's authority within the triumvirate as he was given the task of delivering the report of the central committee to the gathering — the main political statement of the Communist Party for the year. With the economic crisis of 1923 abating somewhat, Zinoviev continued to focus on conditions in rural Russia, declaring "the Party is still too much an urban party; we know the countryside too little." Indeed, this was the period of "High NEP," and as British historian E.H. Carr observed, "no party held at this period and under Zinoviev's leadership could fail to pay its tribute to the primary importance of the peasant."

=== The "Literary Discussion" of 1924 ===
The "Literary Discussion" was launched in October 1924 with the publication of the 1917 volume of Trotsky's collected works.

The fourth quarter 1924 was marked by the so-called "Literary Discussion" in which the various leading participants in the Lenin succession struggle began to take explicit aim at one another with pamphlets, books, and magazine articles. The first great salvo came October 14, with the publication of the third volume of Trotsky's Collected Works by the State Publishing House — a two-part volume focused on Trotsky's writings during the revolution of 1917.

Trotsky used the foreword of this book as the venue for a 60-page introductory essay, "Uroki Oktyabrya" (Lessons of October), an extensive summary of the events of 1917. In this essay, Trotsky noted in passing recent Comintern failures with revolutionary uprisings in Bulgaria and Germany, an implicit criticism of Zinoviev's leadership, before moving to revisit details of the October days, during which, according to Trotsky, "the right wing of the party sought to delay the development of events," believing, as did the Mensheviks, that the February revolution would lead inevitably to so-called "bourgeois parliamentarianism," that multiple years remained before the time would be ripe for proletarian revolution, and that the Central Committee's advocacy of armed insurrection thus marked a grievous error and a threat to the Bolshevik Party's existence.

Zinoviev and Kamenev's letter of October 11, "On the Current Sitaution," declaring armed insurrection to be a "risk not just to the fate of our party, but the fate of the Russian and international revolution as well," was emphasized. Clearly, these two would have preferred such a collywobble to have remained unmentioned. The essay was regarded as a full-frontal attack by Trotsky on the revolutionary credentials of the party leadership; the response by Zinoviev and the Politburo majority was immediate and vigorous.

On October 24, just ten days after Trotsky's volume had hit the street, the Central Committee issued a statement, over the signatures of Zinoviev and Kamenev, decrying Trotsky's new book introduction as "a conscious distortion of the history of the party" designed to promote "Comrade Trotsky's factional goals. The Central Committee sent additional instructions callling for the "distribution of appropriate works" dealing with the 1917 revolution — a clear signal for the release of a spate of new pamphlets to counter Trotsky's perspective.

Zinoviev's chief contribution to the anti-Trotsky campaign of 1924 was an article published on November 30 and frequently reprinted in pamphlet form, Bolshevism or Trotskyism? The massive article appeared simultaneously in Sunday editions of the official party daily, Pravda, as well as the official government daily, Izvestiya, and bluntly charged Trotsky with a conscious attempt to substitute an ill-defined "Trotskyism" directly for "Leninism." This followed a tag-team effort by Kamenev and Stalin on the same them that had similarly appeared in both publications the previous Wednesday, emphasizing for all readers the direction of the political winds then blowing.

Zinoviev would follow this effort up with a long book attempting to establish "Leninism" as a body of formal doctrine and to emphasize Trotsky's missteps and failures to adhere to it in 1925 with the publication of Leninism: Introduction to the Study of Leninism.

They and their supporters accused Trotsky of various mistakes during the Russian Civil War in order to damage his reputation, and alleged that he was plotting a military coup. This campaign prompted Trotsky to resign in protest as People's Commissar of Army and Fleet Affairs and Chairman of the Revolutionary Military Council in January 1925, stating that the constant political attacks made it impossible to carry out his duties as military leader. Zinoviev further demanded Trotsky's expulsion from the Communist Party, but Stalin refused to go along at that time and played the role of a mediator.

=== The break with Stalin ===
With Trotsky finally on the sidelines, the Zinoviev-Kamenev-Stalin triumvirate began to crumble. In the fall of 1924, Stalin, head of the Communist Party's Organization Bureau, in charge of job assignments, removed Zinoviev ally I. A. Zelensky as secretary of the Moscow party committee and transferred him to a position in Central Asia. In his place was installed N. A. Uglanov, a former party secretary in Petrograd who had frequently found himself at odds with Zinoviev. This move undercut not only Zinoviev, but Kamenev, who found Uglanov, a member of the Orgburo and the Party Secretariat, an active opponent in ostensibly his own Moscow center of power.

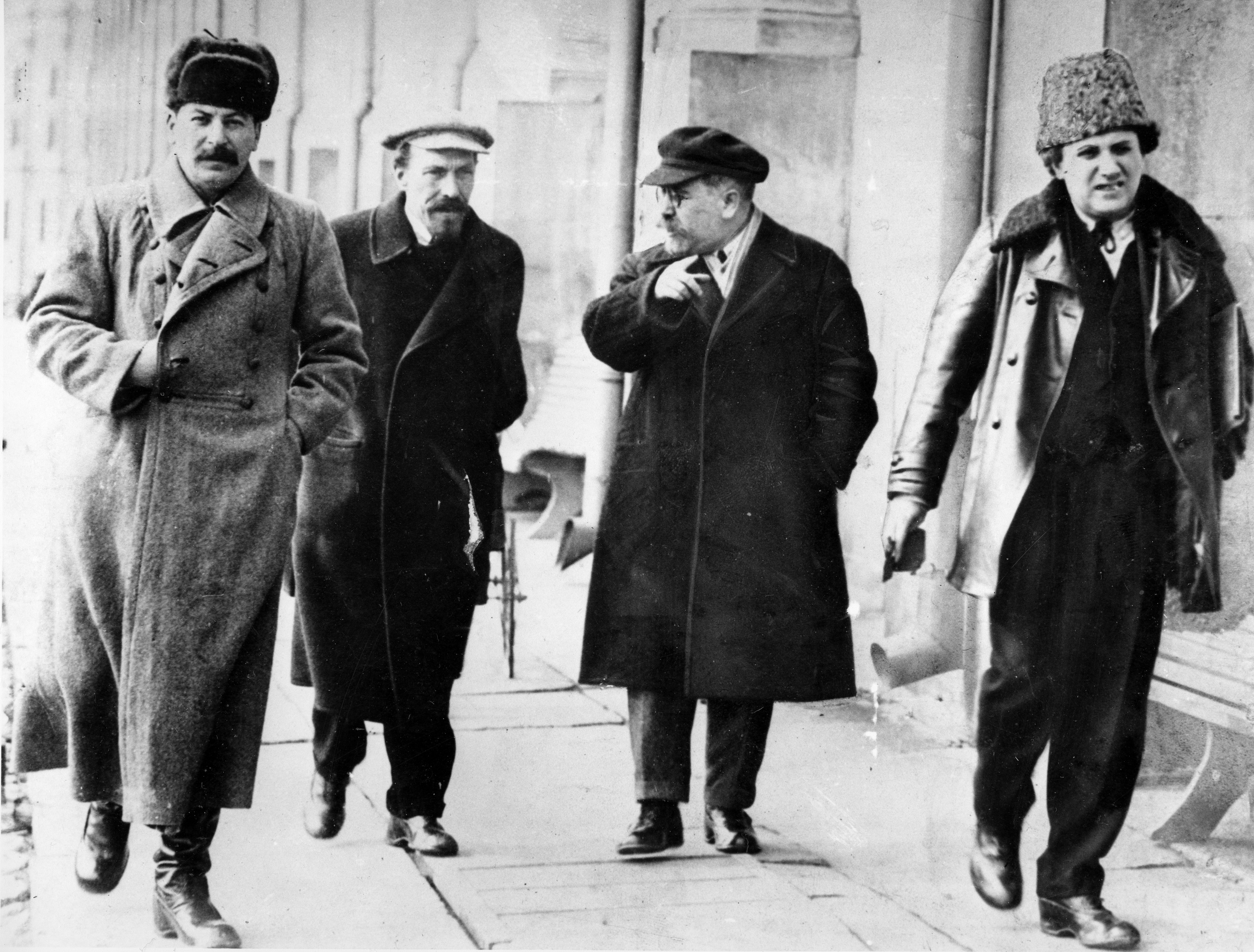
Top leaders of the USSR, April 1925 in a Kremlin photo: Joseph Stalin, Alexei Rykov, Lev Kamenev, and Grigory Zinoviev.

The two sides spent most of 1925 lining up support behind the scenes. Stalin struck an alliance with a Communist Party theoretician and Pravda editor Nikolai Bukharin and Soviet prime minister Alexei Rykov. Zinoviev and Kamenev allied with Lenin's widow, Nadezhda Krupskaya, and Grigory Sokolnikov, the Soviet Commissar of Finance and a non-voting Politburo member.

The struggle became open at the September 1925 meeting of the Central Committee and came to a head at the 14th Party Congress in December 1925. With only the Leningrad delegation behind them, Zinoviev and Kamenev found themselves in a tiny minority and were soundly defeated. Zinoviev was re-elected to the Politburo, but his ally Kamenev was demoted from a full member to a non-voting member and Sokolnikov was dropped altogether, while Stalin had more of his allies elected to the Politburo.

Within weeks of the Congress, Stalin wrested control of the Leningrad party organization and government from Zinoviev and had him dismissed from all regional posts, leaving only the Comintern as a possible power base for Zinoviev.

During a lull in the intra-party fighting in the spring of 1926, Zinoviev, Kamenev and their supporters gravitated closer to Trotsky's supporters and the two groups soon formed an alliance, which also incorporated some smaller opposition groups within the Communist Party. The alliance became known as the United Opposition. In May 1926, Stalin, weighing his options in a letter to Vyacheslav Molotov, directed his supporters to concentrate their attacks on Zinoviev since the latter was intimately familiar with Stalin's methods from their time together in the triumvirate.

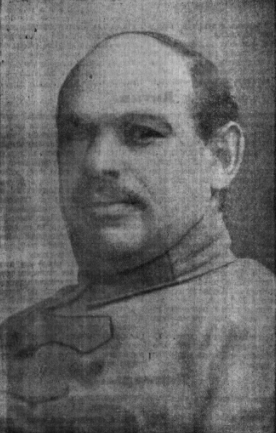
Deputy People's Commissar of War Mikhail Lashevich, a member of Zinoviev's "United Opposition."

In June 1926, a number of members of the opposition held a secret meeting in a forest near Moscow — a gathering organized and addressed by Mikhail Lashevich, a candidate member of the Central Committee and deputy People's Commissar of War, and G. Belenky, a Comintern official. News of the gathering was reported to the Stalin–Bukharin majority faction, however, and on June 20 the Communist Party's disciplinary arm, the Central Control Commission, dominated by the Stalin–Bukharin faction, reprimanded the organizers and called for Lashevich's removal from his job and seat on the Central Committee.

The Central Committee was next to act in the matter of this so-called Lashevich Affair, convening a joint plenum with the Central Control Commission on July 14, lasting 10 days. Near the start of this protracted meeting a written program was presented by a minority faction, including Trotsky, Zinoiev, Kamenev, and others. This document called for policy changes with resepect to wage rates, taxation, and agricultural focus, as well as making a protracted attack of "bureaucratic deformations of the party apparatus" that led to top-down decision-making and a denial of a right to criticize the actions of superiors.

"These severe bureaucratic defects in the party regime are what have made defendancts out of Comrades Lashevich and Belenky, whom the party has known for more than two decades aas devoted and disciplined members," this so-called "Declaration of the Thirteen" boldly asserted. While not mentioning Stalin directly, the declaration did take an indirect shot at the leader of the majority faction by holding up a December 1925 speech by his right-hand man, V.M. Molotov for ridicule.

The denouement had been reached. On July 20, the governing presidium of the Central Control Commission, clearly acting in accordance with a private factional decision, decided to expand the focus of the Lashevich inquiry to include Zinoviev, owing to his and Belenky's close personal and political ties with the Comintern leader. In the bitter debate that followed, the majority Stalin group held sway, with the final resolution of the joint plenum declaring:

While holding all Party members participating in the factional struggle responsible for it, the Party cannot fail to hold Comrade Zinoviev...politically responsible for this divisive struggle; his like-minded associates are taking a most active part in factional work and are utilizing the apparatus of the [Comintern], which is subordinate to Comrade Zinoviev — especially given that Comrade Zinoviev has made not the slightest attempt to condemn these associates of his or to dissociate himself from them.... [D]eeming it intolerable that the actual leadership of the opposition’s factional struggle is being carried out by a member of the Politburo of the CC, [it is resolved] to remove Comrade Zinoviev from the Politburo of the CC..."

Soon thereafter the post of the Comintern president was abolished, eliminating Zinoviev's final position of power.

Despite his demotion, Zinoviev refused to recant, remaining in opposition to Stalin and his majority faction into 1927. This decision resulting in his expulsion from the Central Committee in October 1927. When the United Opposition tried to organize independent demonstrations commemorating the 10th anniversary of the October Revolution in November 1927, the demonstrators were dispersed by force and Zinoviev and Trotsky were expelled from the Communist Party on November 12. Their leading supporters, from Kamenev down, were expelled in December 1927 by the 15th Party Congress, paving the way for mass expulsions of rank-and-file oppositionists as well as internal exile of opposition leaders in early 1928.

According to Zinoviev's testimony while in NKVD custody in December 1934, Zinoviev's political faction maintained an underground organization in Leningrad, complete with ward committees, in 1927 and 1928, with its participants having "melted away" by the latter date so that "after 1929 there was no organization at all." The Zinoviev opposition was thus effectively terminated.

=== Submission to Stalin (1928–1934) ===
While Trotsky remained firm in his opposition to Stalin after his expulsion from the Party and subsequent exile, Zinoviev and Kamenev capitulated almost immediately and called on their supporters to follow suit. They wrote open letters acknowledging their mistakes and were readmitted to the Communist Party after a six-month cooling off period. They never regained their Central Committee seats, but they were given mid-level positions within the Soviet bureaucracy. Bukharin, then at the beginning of his short and ill-fated struggle with Stalin, courted Kamenev and, indirectly, Zinoviev during the summer of 1928. This was soon reported to Stalin and used against Bukharin as proof of his factionalism.

After once more admitting their supposed mistakes, they were readmitted to the Party in December 1933. They were forced to make self-flagellating speeches at the 17th Party Congress in January 1934, with Stalin parading his erstwhile political opponents, now defeated and outwardly contrite.

=== The Kirov murder ===
Late in the afternoon of December 1, 1934, first secretary of the Leningrad Communist Party organization Sergei Kirov entered the Smolny building, the government's headquarters in the city. An address to a 6 pm meeting of party activists was on his agenda for the evening. Kirov's office was located on the third floor of the building, the nexus of party activity, protected by an armed guard, with access strictly limited to Communist Party members.

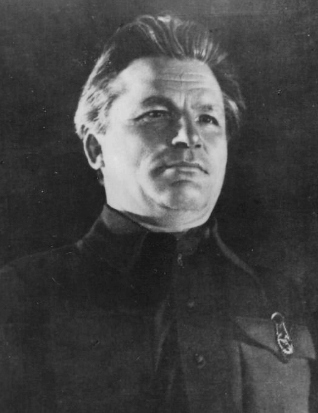
Sergei Kirov, assassinated chief of the Leningrad Communist Party organization.

As Kirov passed down the hallway to his office, an unemployed Communist named Leonid Nikolaev, who lay in wait with a briefcase in his hand and a revolver in his pocket, stepped from a restroom. Nikolaev allowed Kirov to pass, then circled behind him, following him from the main corridor to a small corridor leading to his office. As Kirov slowed to enter his office, Nikolaev sped up his step to reduce the distance, pulled the handgun, and shot the Leningrad party boss — a close friend of Joseph Stalin — once in the back of the head, killing him instantly.

Nikolaev was speedily apprehended and subjected to the tender mercies of the interrogators of the NKVD for investigation.

Prior to the opening of Soviet archives in the early 1990s, a great deal of scholarly and popular literature, working from the third- and fourth-hand oral testimony of various NKVD defectors, posited that the Kirov assassination was a calculated inside job ordered by Stalin himself to annihilate a potential rival for power rather than the work of a disgruntled lone wolf with a party card. The rich vein of archival documents now available seems to have relegated this material to the stacks as examples of misdirected Kremlinology, however.

The night of December 1/2, Nikolaev underwent his first round of interrogation, conducted by the central NKVD rather than local Leningrad officials. Nikolaev's wife and half-brother were also hauled in for questioning, with initial investigation focusing on building a timeline of activities for the Nikolaev brothers and focusing on a potential foreign connection between his wife, Milda Draule, her relatives in Latvia, and various German engineers. A complete set of interrogation transcripts was provided to Stalin by Deputy Chief of the NKVD Yakov Agranov on December 4 and daily updates followed — all of which still remain in party archives. No mention was made of Zinoviev or his followers during the first three days of the investigation.

On December 2 or 3, Stalin intervened to redirect the investigation from foreign-linked activity to Communist Party opponents with secret police boss Nikolay Yezhov publicly asserting in 1937 that Stalin and his inner circle were already focused on enemies in the Leninigrad party organization, phoning up Yezhov with the instruction to "look for the killer among the Zinovievites." Surviving investigation protocols show a sharp change of focus on December 4, with Agranov beginning to press Nikolaev on his connections with "Zinovievites."

On December 4, Nikolaev submitted to his interrogators, declaring that his "ties with the Trotskyites [Nikolai] Shatsky, Vania Kotolynov, and Nikolai Barding and others influenced my decision to kill Comrade Kirov." As followers of Trotsky and Zinoviev had joined as a "United Opposition" in 1926–27 and stood side by side against the majority Stalin faction, this was regarded as a potentially critical connection since, as historian Matthew Lenoe has noted, "there was not a clear distinction between Zinovievite and Trotskyite ideas" during that interval. Indeed, Agranov directly informed Stalin by telegram the next day that "according to the testimony of Nikolaev...the Trotskyites Shatsky, Bardin, and Kotolynov were of a terrorist disposition."

Chief investigator Agranov took an overnight train from Leningrad to Moscow the night of December 7/8 to meet with Stalin and his inner circle, including Molotov, Lazar Kaganovich, Sergo Ordzhonikidze, Andrei Zhdanov, NKVD chief Yagoda, and future NKVD chief Nikolai Yezhov that afternoon. Zinoviev and his former supporters seem to have been specifically targeted at this time. The following day the NKVD arrested seven former leaders of the Leningrad Communist Party leadership from the period of Zinoviev's primacy — all of whom who had been expelled from the party late in 1927 as oppositionists. Yezhov joined Agranov in Leningrad to assist with the investigation, questioning witnesses about the NKVD detachment assigned to provide security at Smolny at the time of the Kirov killing.

That same day, goaded to provide evidence against "former participants in the counterrevolutionary Trotsky–Zinoviev Opposition," the arrested Vladimir Rumiantsev, a former factional ally of Zinoviev, provided the first direct testimony hinting at direct conspiratorial activity by Zinoviev and Kamenev themselves. The secret police's net was closing in on its ultimate targets.

=== Arrest, trial, imprisonment, retrial, execution ===
By the middle of December 1934, following an evolving centrally-created script, personal relationships between former members of the Zinoviev opposition had been used as building blocks detailing an eloborate counterrevolutionary network. Included were parallel organizations identified as the "Moscow Center" and the "Leningrad Center" — the latter of which was said to consist of five underground "groups." The conspratorial organization was alleged to have formed in 1933, with Zinoviev purportedly joining the so-called Moscow Center; the assassin Leonid Nikolaev was listed as a member of the dual Leningrad organization.

Early in the evening of December 16, NKVD People's Commissar Yagoda, in charge of the Moscow investigation, conducted simultaneous raids on his apartment as well as those of Kamenev and former Leningradskaia pravda editor Georgy Safarov, formerly a close political associate. Even while the raid was going on and old documents being seized, including Zinoviev's 1920s-era correspondence with Trotsky, Zinoviev sat down and set pen to paper writing an abject note to Stalin:

"I can say to you honestly, Comrade Stalin, that from the moment I returned from Kustanaya... I have not had even one single thought which I might want to hide from the party, from the Central Committee, from you personally... I have and could have nothing more than old archives... I am guilty of nothing, nothing, nothing before the party, before the Central Committee, and before you personally. I swear to you by everything that a Bolshevik can hold sacred, I swear to you by Lenin's memory. I cannot imagine what could have sparked suspicion against me."

The secret investigation now went public, with Pravda and Leningradskaya pravda running an ominous identical lead editorial, "Without Mercy We Must Root Out the Remnants of Our Smashed Enemies!" The remaining dominos fell rapidly. On December 20 the Central Control Commission expelled Zinoviev, Kamenev, Safarov, and 22 others from party membership as "counterrevolutionaries," followed immediately thereafter by arrest.

They were tried in January 1935 and forced to admit "moral complicity" in Kirov's assassination. Zinoviev was sentenced to 10 years in prison and his supporters to various prison terms.

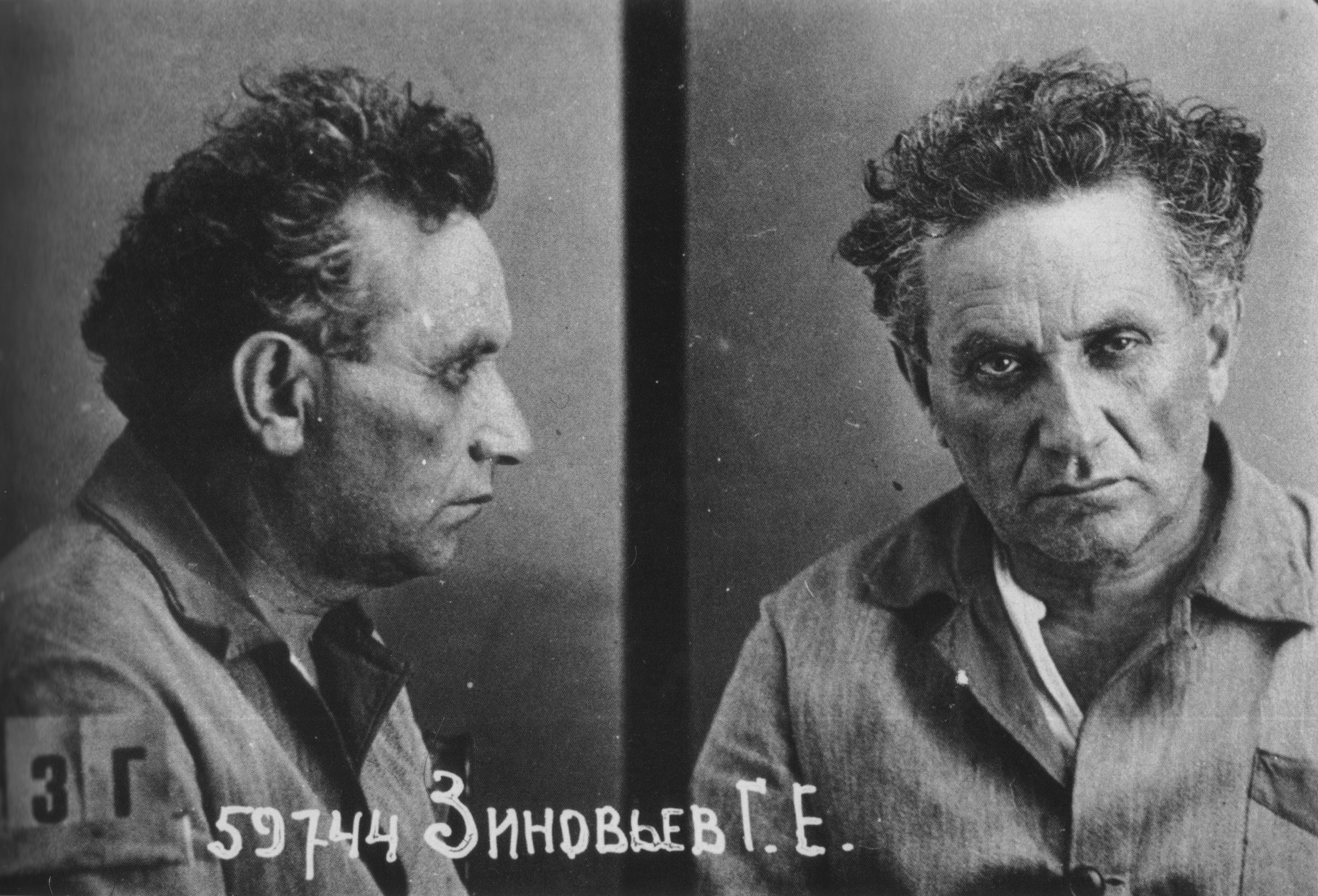
Police photographs of Zinoviev, taken by the NKVD in prison in 1936.

In August 1936, after months of rehearsals in secret police prisons, Zinoviev, Kamenev and 14 others, mostly Old Bolsheviks, were put on trial again. This time, the charges included forming a terrorist organization that killed Kirov and tried to kill Stalin and other leaders of the Soviet government. This Trial of the Sixteen (or the trial of the "Trotskyite-Zinovievite Terrorist Center") was the first Moscow Show Trial and set the stage for subsequent show trials where Old Bolsheviks confessed to increasingly elaborate and egregious crimes, including espionage, poisoning and sabotage. Zinoviev and the other defendants were found guilty on 24 August 1936.

Before the trial, Zinoviev and Kamenev had agreed to plead guilty to the false charges on the condition that they not be executed, a condition that Stalin accepted, stating "that goes without saying". A few hours after their conviction, Stalin ordered their execution that night. Shortly after midnight, on the morning of 25 August, Zinoviev and Kamenev were executed by firing squad.

Accounts of Zinoviev's execution vary, with some having him beg and plead for his life, prompting the stoic Kamenev to tell Zinoviev to "quiet down and die with dignity". Zinoviev allegedly struggled against the guards escorting him so fiercely that instead of taking him to the appointed execution room, he was simply dragged into a nearby cell and shot there.

Zinoviev's futile pleading was later re-enacted and mocked by Stalin's personal bodyguard, Karl Pauker. Stalin was described to have "laughed immoderately on seeing an imitation of the old Bolshevik leader Grigori Zinoviev being dragged to his execution, making pleas for mercy with obscenities". Stalin was told Zinoviev's last words were "Hear, O Israel ..." Pauker would himself later perish in the purges.

The execution of Zinoviev, Kamenev and their associates was a sensational news event in the USSR and around the world, paving the way for the mass arrests and executions of the Great Purge of 1937–1938. In 1988, during perestroika, Zinoviev and his co-defendants were formally rehabilitated by the Military Collegium of the Supreme Court of the Soviet Union.

=== Legacy ===
Between 1924 and 1934 Zinoviev's home town of Yelizavetgrad was renamed Zinovyevsk (Ukrainian: Зінов'євськ) in his honor.

In an article published after his own death at the hands of the Soviet secret police, Leon Trotsky remembered his rival and occasional ally, Grigory Zinoviev in tandem with Lev Kamenev:

"Zinoviev and Kamenev are two profoundly different types. Zinoviev is an agitator. Kamenev — a propagandist. Zinoviev was guided in the main by subtle political instinct. Kamenev was given to reason and analyzing. Zinoviev was always inclined to fly off on a tangent. Kamenev, on the contrary, erred on the side of excessive caution. Zinoviev was entirely absorbed by politics, cultivating no other interests and appetites. In Kamenev there sat a sybarite and an esthete. Zinoviev was vindictive. Kamenev was good nature personified.... In 1917 they were brought close together for a time by their opposition to the October Revolution.... They were subsequently drawn together by their opposition to me, and later, to Stalin. * * *

"Each of them, to be sure, was Stalin's intellectual superior. But they lacked sufficient character. Lenin had precisely this trait in mind when he wrote in his 'testament' that it was 'no accident' that Zinoviev and Kamenev were opponents of the insurrection in the autumn of 1917. They failed to withstand the pressure of bourgeois public opinion."

Historian Edward Hallett Carr was more assertive in his negative assessment of Zinoviev, charging him with having been "the initiator of many sinister developments in party history." Carr asserted that Zinoviev, "was more responsible than anyone for establishing the cult of Leninism" and for making "absolute fidelity to Lenin" the "main and indispensible qualification" for party leadership. He also charged that Zinoviev invented, or was at least the first Soviet leader to publicly use, the term "Trotskyism" as a term of abuse for factional rivals. He was additionally, according to Carr, responsible for the party norm that defeated minorities in party debates should not merely submit to the decision of the majority but also to confess error, and for the practice of denouncing any alteration from the current party line as a form of heresy.

These doctrines, Carr declares, were a rather natural byproduct of Zinoviev's own political needs, in which his "close association to Lenin was his principal asset and the source of his prestige" among the party rank-and-file.

This was not all. In addition to such "sinister developments," Carr charged Zinoviev for possessing a toxic combination of personal ambition and political ineptitude:

"Zinoviev understood nothing of the nature of political power or the management of men, and he lacked the native tact that sometimes goes with innocence. Clumsy in all his dealings, he revealed his cards before the time had come to play them. His ambition to assume the mantle of Lenin was so naively displayed as to make his vanity ridiculous.... Nor had he any gifts as an organizer. When he attempted to counter Stalin's rising power, the Leningrad party machine, of which he had hitherto been undisputed master, crumbled in his hand, leaving him helpless in face of an adversary infintely astuter and better prepared for the fray.

"No leading Bolshevik of this period incurred so much adverse personal criticism as Zinoviev, or appears to have been so widely disliked. None of them inspired so little personal respect.... Compared with his fellow-triumvirs he lacked the acumen of Kamenev or the application of Stalin.... Zinoviev never succeeded in attaining either depth of conviction or depth of understanding; and this innate superficiality, among men who treated the subtleness of doctrine with passionate earnestness, won him an unenviable reputation for shiftiness and lack of scruple."

Writing more than half a century after Carr, historian Lars Lih put forward a more nuanced view of the "populist Leninist" Zinoviev in a 2011 book:

"Zinoviev was not in the least a systematic thinker who could state a coherent outlook in propositional form. On the other hand, he was an inspirational speaker who very often told stories — small anecdotes from daily life, large narratives about the revolution as a whole — in order to impress his audience. An assessment of the coherence and consistency of his outlook therefore requires a systematic survey of his many speeches during his time in the top leadership of the ruling Bolshevik party."

Despite his abilities as an inspirational orator, Lih characterizes Zinoviev as ultimately a man of "anti-charisma" who promoted simplistic and dubious policy proposals and made tactical political errors that ultimately doomed him in the contest for top leadership in the USSR. Lih challenged Carr's harsh assessment that Zinoviev opportunistically adjusted his sails during the agricultural policy debates of 1925, arguing that Zinoviev maintained an "essential consistency" in his views.

==== Post-Soviet archival research ====
Post-Soviet archival research has nuanced earlier Cold War-era assessments. Historical records indicate that Zinoviev's power base in Leningrad was deeply rooted in local patronage networks, and his opposition to Stalin was initially framed around ideological concerns regarding the pace of industrialization and party "bureaucratization", rather than mere personal ambition.

== "Zinoviev Letter" ==
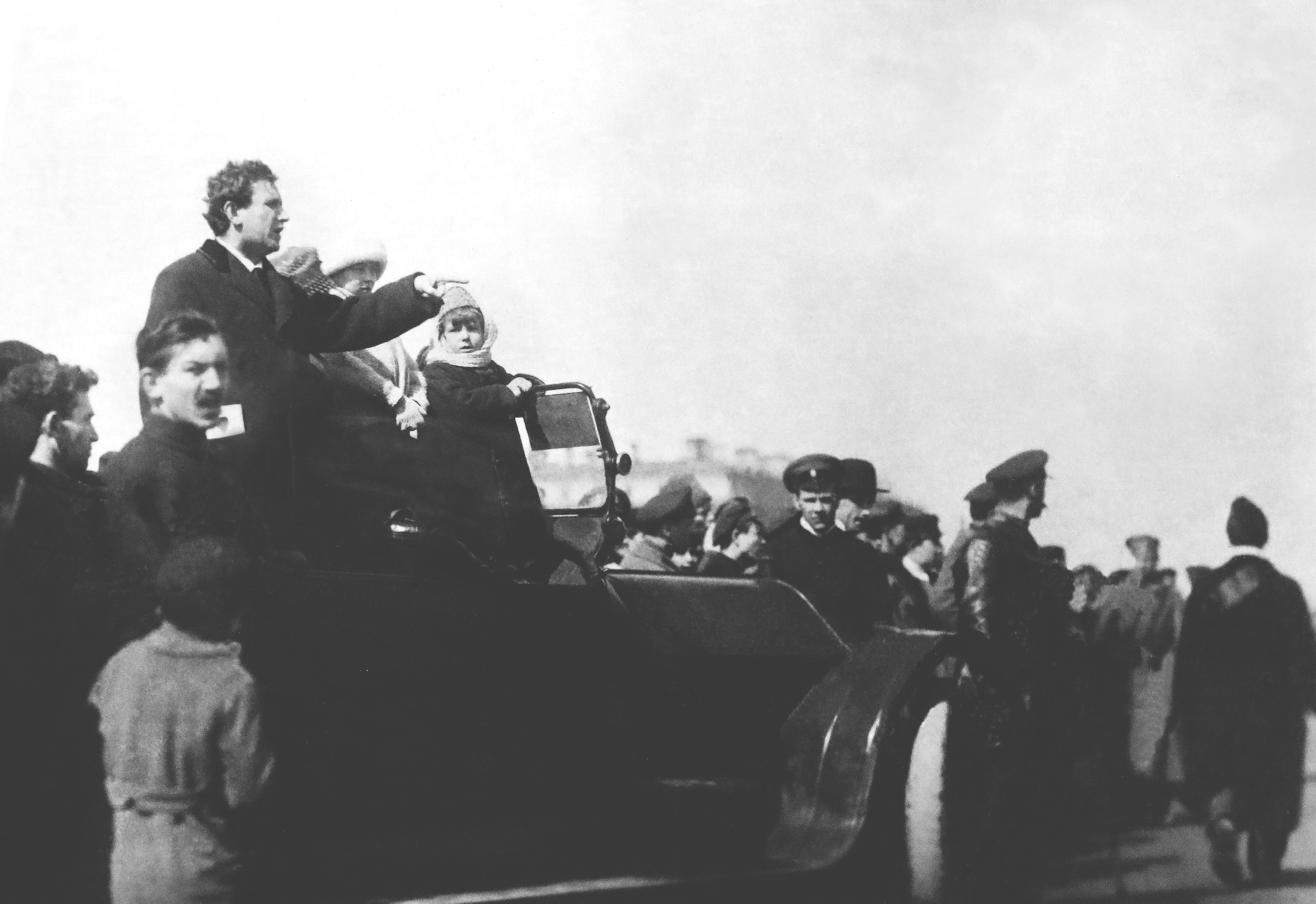
Grigory Zinoviev, Chairman of the Petrograd Soviet, addresses the crowd on the first International Workers' Day after the October Uprising (the Bolshevik Revolution), 1 May 1918.

Zinoviev was the alleged author of the "Zinoviev Letter" which caused a sensation in the United Kingdom when published on 25 October 1924, four days before a general election. The letter called on British Communists to prepare for revolution. This document is now generally accepted to have been a fabrication, validating the declaration that Zinoviev made in a letter dated 27 October 1924:

The letter of 15 September 1924, which has been attributed to me, is from the first to the last word, a forgery. Let us take the heading. The organisation of which I am the president never describes itself officially as the Executive Committee of the Third Communist International; the official name is Executive Committee of the Communist International. Equally incorrect is the signature, The Chairman of the Presidium. The forger has shown himself to be very stupid in his choice of the date. On 15 September 1924, I was taking a holiday in Kislovodsk, and, therefore, could not have signed any official letter. ...

It is not difficult to understand why some of the leaders of the Liberal-Conservative bloc had recourse to such methods as the forging of documents. Apparently they seriously thought they would be able, at the last minute before the elections, to create confusion in the ranks of those electors who sincerely sympathise with the Treaty between England and the Soviet Union. It is much more difficult to understand why the English Foreign Office, which is still under the control of the Prime Minister, MacDonald, (Note: The letter was published in December, after Ramsay MacDonald, the first prime minister from the socialist Labour Party, had been replaced with the Conservative Stanley Baldwin. A footnote clarifies that the letter was written while MacDonald was still prime minister.) did not refrain from making use of such a white-guardist forgery.

Despite Zinoviev's prompt denial, the publication of the forged document contributed to a "Red Scare" in Britain. Historians argue that the controversy damaged the Labour Party's electoral prospects, reinforcing public fears of Soviet subversion ahead of the 1924 general election.

== Selected works ==
- N. Lenin: His Life and Works. Toronto: General Workers Unit of the OBU, 1918.
- International of Youth and Its Tasks. [1919] Corvallis, OR: 1000 Flowers, 2026.
- Boi za Peterburg: Dve Rechi (The Fight for St. Petersburg: Two Speeches). With Leon Trotsky. St. Petersburg: Gosudarstvennoe Izdatel'stvo, 1920.
- International of Youth and Its Tasks: Speech to the Congress of Youth, September 16, 1919. [1919] Corvallis, OR: 1000 Flowers, 2026.
- Bolshevizm ili Trotskizm? (with L. Kamenev and I. Stalin) Kursk: Gubkom, 1925.
- Revolution, Stabilization, and Socialism in One Country: Report to a plenum of the Central Committee of the Russian Communist Party, Moscow — April 26, 1925." Corvallis, OR: 1000 Flowers, 2026.
- Leninizm: Vvedenie i izuchenie Leninizma [Leninism: Introduction to the Study of Leninism]. Leningrad: Gosudarstvennoe Izdatel'stvo, 1925.
- Komsomol and Party. [1925] Corvallis, OR: 1000 Flowers, 2026.

== See also ==
- Outline of the Russian Revolution and Civil War
- Bibliography of the Russian Revolution and Civil War
- Bibliography of Stalinism and the Soviet Union
- Index of Old Bolsheviks
- Index of articles related to the Russian Revolution and Civil War
- Foreign relations of the Soviet Union
- Moscow Trials
- United Opposition (Soviet Union)
