= Sarra Ravich =

- Born: August 1, 1879; Vitebsk, Russian Empire
- Died: 1957
- Occupation: Politician
- Spouse: Grigory Zinoviev

Sarra Naumovna Ravich (Russian: Са́рра Нау́мовна Ра́вич; pseudonym, Olga; 1879–1957) was a figure in the Russian revolutionary movement. She was the first wife of Grigory Zinoviev.

== Biography ==
She was born on August 1, 1879, in Vitebsk into a Jewish family. Her father was a merchant, Nohim Leib Ravich, and her mother was Golda, née Yakhnim. She became a member of the RSDLP (Russian Social Democratic Labour Party) in 1903. In June 1906, she moved to Paris, where she spent 6 months before relocating to Geneva. There, she met Grigory Zinoviev and became his wife (though their marriage was brief). She studied at the Faculty of Philosophy at the University of Geneva.

In 1908, she was arrested in Munich in connection with a case involving a robbery in Tiflis, during which she tried to exchange banknotes stolen during the heist. By no later than 1911, she married economist Vyacheslav Alekseevich Karpinsky. Together with her husband, she managed the library named after G. A. Kuklin in Geneva.

She returned to Russia in 1917 in a sealed train along with Lenin, Zinoviev, and his second wife, Zlata Ionovna Lilina, and their son Stefan. She actively participated in party work, carrying out assignments from Lenin and the Central Committee of the CPSU (Communist Party of the Soviet Union). In 1917, she was a member of the Petrograd Committee of the RSDLP(b) (Russian Social Democratic Labour Party (Bolsheviks)). After the assassination of Moisei Uritsky, she performed the duties of the Commissioner for Internal Affairs of the Northern Region. She was a delegate to many party congresses and was a member of the Congress of the CPSU from 1924 to 1925. In 1918, she aligned with the "left communists" and, in 1920, became the first authorized representative of the People's Commissariat for Foreign Affairs in Petrograd.

She wrote memoirs titled Beyond the Threshold of Life as well as articles on the philosophical and political views of Nikolay Chernyshevsky, Vsevolod Garshin, and others.

== Arrests, imprisonments, and exile ==
From 1922, she was a member of the Moscow branch of the All-Union Society of Old Bolsheviks. She was an active participant in the opposition from 1926 to 1927. In 1927, she was expelled from the party but reinstated in 1928. In 1935, she was expelled again for "counter-revolutionary activities." Prior to her arrest, she was the manager of the Voronezh Confectionery Trust. On December 12, 1934, she was arrested and exiled to Yakutia for 5 years.

She was subsequently arrested again in 1937, 1946, and 1951, and was only released in 1954 following a decision by the Ministry of Internal Affairs and the Prosecutor's Office of the USSR, which lifted her criminal record but did not fully rehabilitate her in court. She died in a retirement home.
