= Lars T. Lih =

American-born historian

Lars T. Lih is a historian and scholar of Russian and socialist history. His books include Lenin, Lenin Rediscovered, and Bread and Authority in Russia, 1914–1921.

Lih was raised in "a small town in Cold War America". He received a B.A. from Yale University in 1968 and a B.Phil. from the University of Oxford in 1971 before working for six years in the office of U.S. Representative Ron Dellums. He later completed a Ph.D. in political science at Princeton University in 1984. He has written for Jacobin, Weekly Worker, and the International Socialist Review, and has published several books. He was also, for a time, a lecturer at the Schulich School of Music of McGill University in Montreal, Canada.

His 2006 book Lenin Rediscovered was about Vladimir Lenin's What Is to Be Done?, and was written in part to counter the mainstream perceptions and interpretations of the book; Lih argues that "What is To be Done? is not so important, but it is very important to see why it is not so important". In 2024, he published What Was Bolshevism?, a book using primary sources from Lenin, Stalin, Bukharin, Trotsky, and Zinoviev to "paint an indispensable self-portrait of Soviet civilization".

== Books ==
- Lih, Lars T. (2024). What Was Bolshevism?. Historical Materialism. Brill. (also published by Haymarket)
- Lih, Lars T. (2011). Lenin. Critical Lives. Reaktion Books. (also distributed by the University of Chicago Press)
- Lih, Lars T. (2006). Lenin Rediscovered: 'What Is to Be Done?' in Context. Brill. (republished in 2008 by Haymarket)
- Lih, Lars T. (1990). Bread and Authority in Russia, 1914–1921. University of California Press.
