= Executive Committee of the Petrograd Soviet =

The Executive Committee of the Petrograd Soviet, commonly known as the Petrograd Soviet Ispolkom (Russian: Петроградский исполнительный комитет) was a self-appointed executive committee of the Petrograd Soviet. As an antagonist of the Russian Provisional Government, after the 1917 February Revolution in Russia, the Ispolkom became a second center of power. It was dissolved during the Bolshevik October Revolution later that year.

The Ispolkom are known for the controversial "Order No 1" (and 3) which stipulated that all military units should form committees like the Petrograd Soviet and that the military from every political perspective should not contradict the Ispolkom. The socialists at the Petrograd Soviet feared that officers were the most likely counter revolutionary elements and the intention of the Order was to limit their power. These orders rendered the officers powerless at the Russian front lines of World War I, which led to confusion, disastrous military discipline, and desertions.

== History ==
During World War I, on 22 February 1917 (Julian Calendar) Tsar Nikolai II decided to leave Petrograd and travel to the front. The following day minor riots began on International Women's Day. Within a few days, riots morphed into a revolution in Russia's capital city - the February Revolution. The Tsar abdicated at Pskov on the afternoon of 2 March.

On March 1, the parliament, the State Duma had elected a Provisional Committee of the State Duma which later would be known as the Russian Provisional Government. Workers and soldiers had simultaneously (on the same date) founded the Petrograd Soviet on their own. This revolutionary assembly had several thousand people, and without any firm rules. As their meetings tended to be a blur of oration, the Socialist intellectuals in the Soviet formed an executive committee of their own, the Ispolkom, initially the provisional one, and later the permanent one. It was not elected by the Soviet, but self-appointed.

All parties represented in the Petrograd Soviet had three members each. The Ispolkom soon began issuing orders, without consulting the provisional government. Their first five orders, usually merged under the name "Order No 1" aimed to stop conservative officers from making a counterrevolution, led to disaster at the front. The still unknown Stalin was among the Bolshevik representatives in the Ispolkom.

The Ispolkom continued to compete with the provisional government. As the Ispolkom member Alexander Kerensky joined the government, Kerensky himself began to rise above both the Ispolkom and the government and became the Minister of War. The February Revolution, which the Ispolkom became a significant part of, wasn't a bloodbath. It had a democratic and Social Democratic background. But the new Russian state became volatile as the Provisional Government, the Ispolkom as well as Kerensky himself, wished to continue the war.

After the October Revolution, the Bolsheviks under Lenin and Trotsky, dissolved the sitting Ispolkom, and imposed a new, Bolshevik dominated, Ispolkom. Its prior power was diminished. After the Bolsheviks moved Russia's capital back to Moscow, Petrograd as a city declined. So did the Petrograd Soviet and Ispolkom.

== Parties and movements ==
All political parties and movements who were included in the entire Petrograd Soviet had representatives in the Ispolkom. They had in common a strong dislike of the autocratic monarchy. This is (an incomplete) list of political parties and movements who supported the February Revolution:

- Socialist Revolutionary Party
- Mensjevik Party
- Liberal Party & Octobrists (a confederation often known as "The Cadets")
- Popular Socialist Party
- Left Socialist Revolutionaries
- Farmers' Socialist Party ("Trudoviks")
- Progressive Party
- Bolshevik Party
- Anarchists

In May (1917), after having been expanded, the Ispolkom had 72 members. Of these 23 were Mensheviks, 22 Socialist Revolutionaries and 12 Bolsheviks. The remaining 15 members' party affiliation at that time isn't known.

After the October Revolution all other February-revolutionary parties soon boycotted the Bolsheviks, but the Left Social Revolutionaries. During some months in 1918, after the complete breakdown in the Bolshevik-Menshevik negotiations, two members of the Left Socialist Revolutionaries joined Lenin, Trotsky and Stalin in a "Inner Cabinet" Government.

10 (41.6%) of the 24 members of the governing bureau of the Petrograd Soviet were Jewish.

As the Russian Civil War broke out, the last traces of anything that even resembled parliamentary democracy, vanished. Inside the Bolshevik Party a certain limited debate between the "great Bolsheviks" remained for some years, but this passed slowly but surely away while Stalin ensured a new total autocracy.
