= Central Committee of the 16th Congress of the All-Union Communist Party (Bolsheviks) =

1930–1934 leadership body

Central Committee of the 16th Congress

13 July 1930 – 10 February 1934

Leadership
- General Secretary: Joseph Stalin
- Second Secretary: Vyacheslav Molotov (Jul.– Dec. 1930); Lazar Kaganovich (1930–1934)
- Inner-groups: Politburo: 10 full & 5 candidates Secretariat: 5 full & 2 candidates Orgburo: 11 full & 4 candidates

Candidates

Apparatus
- No. of departments: 7

The Central Committee (CC) composition was elected by the 16th Congress, and sat from 13 July 1930 until 10 February 1934. Its 1st Plenary Session elected the Politburo, Secretariat and Orgburo. The 16th Congress was the first party convention since the 13th Congress which saw no organized opposition, and the first congress in party history in which there was no opposition to the party leadership. Ukrainian historian Oleg Khlevniuk considers the period 1930–1934 to be a "transitional period" between collective leadership (referred to interchangeably by him as oligarchy) and Joseph Stalin's personal dictatorship (autocracy). The removal of Alexei Rykov, the Chairman of the Council of People's Commissars (SNK, the Soviet government), from the Politburo at the 1st Joint Plenary Session of the CC and the Central Control Commission (CCC) has been marked in historic literature as "the definitive Stalinization of that body [Politburo]" according to Khlevniuk.

The Central Committee elected Stalin General Secretary of the Central Committee at its 1st Plenary Session. Vyacheslav Molotov served as Stalin's deputy, an informal post referred to by Sovietologists as Second Secretary, and was empowered to manage party business and sign Politburo resolutions when Stalin was away from Moscow. Upon Molotov's appointment as SNK Chairman in December 1930, Lazar Kaganovich took his place as Second Secretary.

This Central Committee composition led the party and the country through the first five-year plan, Syrtsov–Lominadze affair, dekulakization, collectivization of agriculture, Ryutin Affair, Soviet famine of 1932–33 (which has led to accusation of "extermination by hunger" by the Ukrainian state), the beginning of the second five-year plan, purges of the last oppositional elements within the party and heightened repression.

== Plenums ==
The Central Committee was not a permanent institution. It convened plenary sessions. Seven CC plenary sessions and two plenary sessions held in conjunction with the convening of the Central Control Commission were held between the 16th Congress and the 17th Congress. When the CC was not in session, decision-making power was vested in the internal bodies of the CC itself; that is, the Politburo, Secretariat and Orgburo. None of these bodies were permanent either; typically they convened several times a month.

Plenary sessions of the Central Committee
Plenum	Date	Length
1st Plenary Session	13 July 1930	1 day
2nd Plenary Session	1 December 1930	1 day
1st Joint Plenary Session	17–21 December 1930	5 days
3rd Plenary Session	11–15 June 1931	5 days
4th Plenary Session	28–31 October 1931	4 days
5th Plenary Session	4 February 1932	1 day
6th Plenary Session	28 September – 2 October 1932	5 days
2nd Joint Plenary Session	7–12 January 1933	6 days
7th Plenary Session	25 January 1934	1 day

== Apparatus ==
Individuals employed by the Central Committee's bureaus, departments and newspapers made up the apparatus between the 16th Congress and the 17th Congress. The bureaus and departments were supervised by the Secretariat, and each secretary (member of the Secretariat) supervised a specific department. The leaders of departments were officially referred to as Heads, while the titles of bureau leaders varied between chairman, first secretary and secretary.

Central Committee Apparatus of the 16th Congress of the All-Union Communist Party (Bolsheviks)
Institution	Leader	Cyrillic	Took office	Left office	Length of tenure	Nationality	Gender
Accounting Department	Timofey Samsonov	Тимофей Самсонов	1932	10 February 1934	1 year and 254 days	Russian	Male
Administrator of Affairs	Timofey Samsonov	Тимофей Самсонов	13 July 1930	10 February 1934	3 years and 212 days	Russian	Male
Administrative, Enterprise and Trade Union Cadres Department	Ivan Moskvin	Иван Москвин	13 July 1930	14 November 1930	124 days	Russian	Male
Administrative, Enterprise and Trade Union Cadres Department	Nikolai Yezhov	Николай Ежов	14 November 1930	10 February 1934	3 years and 92 days	Russian	Male
Agitation and Mass Campaign Department	Grigory Kaminsky	Григорий Каминский	13 July 1930	August 1930	19 days	Russian	Male
Agitation and Mass Campaign Department	Klavdiya Nikolayeva	Клавдия Николаева	August 1930	1933	2 years and 304 days	Russian	Female
Agriculture Department	Lazar Kaganovich	Лазарь Каганович	15 December 1932	10 February 1934	1 year and 57 days	Jewish	Male
Bolshevik	Vilhelm Knorin	Вильгельм Кнорин	13 July 1930	10 February 1934	3 years and 212 days	Latvian	Male
Central Asian Bureau	Isaak Zelensky	Исаак Зеленский	13 July 1930	January 1931	172 days	Jewish	Male
Central Asian Bureau	Karl Bauman	Карл Бауман	January 1931	10 February 1931	3 years and 40 days	Latvian	Male
Culture and Propaganda Department	Aleksei Stetskii	Алексей Стецкий	13 July 1930	10 February 1934	3 years and 212 days	Russian	Male
Institute of Marx–Engels–Lenin	Vladimir Adoratsky	Владимир Адоратский	November 1931	10 February 1934	3 years and 105 days	Russian	Male
Organizational-Instruction Department	Dmitry Bulatov	Дмитрий Булатов	13 July 1930	July 1931	353 days	Russian	Male
Organizational-Instruction Department	Joseph Meerzon	Жозеф Меерзон	July 1931	1932	336 days	Jewish	Male
Organizational-Instruction Department	Pavel Postyshev	Па́вел По́стышев	1932	January 1933	214 days	Russian	Male
Organizational-Instruction Department	Vladimir Polonsky	Владимир Полонский	January 1933	August 1933	212 days	Russian	Male
Pravda	Lev Mekhlis	Лев Мехлис	13 July 1930	10 February 1934	3 years and 212 days	Jewish	Male
Secret Department	Ivan Tovstukha	Иван Товстуха	13 July 1930	22 July 1930	9 days	Ukrainian	Male
Secret Department	Alexander Poskrebyshev	Александр Поскрёбышев	22 July 1930	10 February 1934	3 years and 203 days	Russian	Male

== Composition ==
=== Members ===
Members of the Central Committee of the 16th Congress of the All-Union Communist Party (Bolsheviks)
Name	Cyrillic	15th CC	17th CC	Birth	Death	PM	Nationality	Gender	Portrait
Pyotr Alexeyev	Пётр Алексеев	Candidate	Reelected	1893	1937	1914	Russian	Male	
Andrey Andreyev	Андрей Андреев	Old	Reelected	1895	1971	1914	Russian	Male	
Nikolay Antipov	Николай Антипов	Old	Reelected	1894	1938	1912	Russian	Male	
Aleksei Badayev	Алексей Бадаев	Old	Reelected	1883	1951	1904	Russian	Male	
Karl Bauman	Карл Бауман	Old	Reelected	1892	1937	1907	Latvian	Male	
Andrei Bubnov	Андрей Бубнов	Old	Reelected	1884	1938	1903	Russian	Male	
Nikolai Bukharin	Никола́й Буха́рин	Old	Candidate	1888	1938	1906	Russian	Male	Nikolai Bukharin
Vlas Chubar	Влас Чубар	Old	Reelected	1891	1939	1907	Ukrainian	Male	Vlas Chubar
Mikhail Chudov	Михаил Чудов	Old	Reelected	1893	1937	1913	Russian	Male	
Mikhail Chuvyrin	Михаил Чувырин	Candidate	Reelected	1883	1947	1903	Russian	Male	
Robert Eikhe	Роберт Эйхе	Candidate	Reelected	1890	1940	1905	Latvian	Male	
Yan Gamarnik	Ян Гамарник	Old	Reelected	1894	1937	1916	Jewish	Male	
Filipp Goloshchyokin	Филипп Голощёкин	Old	Not	1876	1941	1903	Jewish	Male	
Ivan Kabakov	Иван Кабаков	Old	Reelected	1891	1937	1914	Russian	Male	
Lazar Kaganovich	Лазарь Каганович	Old	Reelected	1893	1991	1911	Jewish	Male	
Mikhail Kalinin	Михаил Калинин	Old	Reelected	1875	1946	1898	Russian	Male	
Mendel Khatayevich	Мендель Хатаевич	Candidate	Reelected	1893	1937	1913	Russian	Male	Mendel Khatayevich
Sergey Kirov	Серге́й Ки́ров	Old	Reelected	1886	1934	1904	Russian	Male	
Vilhelm Knorin	Вильгельм Кнорин	Old	Reelected	1890	1938	1910	Latvian	Male	
Ivan Kodatsky	Иван Кодацкий	Candidate	Reelected	1893	1937	1914	Ukrainian	Male	
Nikolay Kolotilov	Николай Колотилов	Old	Not	1885	1937	1903	Russian	Male	
Nikolay Komarov	Николай Комаров	Old	Candidate	1886	1937	1909	Russian	Male	
Joseph Kosior	Иосиф Косиор	Old	Reelected	1889	1937	1908	Polish	Male	
Stanislav Kosior	Станислав Косиор	Old	Reelected	1889	1939	1907	Polish	Male	Stanislav Kosior
Nadezhda Krupskaya	Наде́жда Кру́пская	Old	Reelected	1869	1939	1898	Russian	Female	a photograph of Nadezhda Krupskaya, the date the photograph was taken in 1924
Gleb Krzhizhanovsky	Глеб Кржижано́вский	Old	Reelected	1872	1959	1898	Russian	Male	Gleb Krzhizhanovsky
Nikolay Kubyak	Николай Кубяк	Old	Candidate	1881	1937	1898	Russian	Male	
Valerian Kuybyshev	Валериан Куйбышев	Old	Reelected	1888	1935	1904	Russian	Male	
Emanuel Kviring	Эммануил Квиринг	Old	Not	1888	1937	1912	Volga German	Male	
Dmitry Lebed	Дмитрий Лебедь	New	Reelected	1893	1937	1909	Russian	Male	
Fyodor Leonov	Фёдор Леонов	Candidate	Not	1892	1938	1914	Russian	Male	
Semyon Lobov	Семён Лобов	Old	Reelected	1888	1937	1913	Russian	Male	
Vissarion Lominadze	Виссарион Ломинадзе	Candidate	Removed	1897	1935	1917	Georgian	Male	
Isidore Lyubimov	Исидор Любимов	Old	Reelected	1882	1937	1902	Russian	Male	
Dmitry Manuilsky	Дмитро Мануїльський	Old	Reelected	1883	1959	1903	Ukrainian	Male	
Anastas Mikoyan	Анаста́с Микоя́н	Old	Reelected	1895	1978	1915	Armenian	Male	
Vyacheslav Molotov	Вячеслав Молотов	Old	Reelected	1890	1986	1906	Russian	Male	
Ivan Moskvin	Иван Москвин	Old	Not	1890	1937	1911	Russian	Male	
Ivan Nosov	Иван Носов	Candidate	Reelected	1888	1937	1905	Russian	Male	
Georgy Oppokov	Георгий Оппоков	Old	Not	1888	1938	1903	Russian	Male	a man with a serious demeanour, with tidy hair wearing a blazer, a white shirt and a tie
Mamia Orakhelashvili	Мамия Орахелашвили	Old	Not	1888	1937	1903	Georgian	Male	Mamia Orakhelashvili
Grigol Ordzhonikidze	Григо́рий Орджоники́дзе	By-election	Reelected	1886	1937	1903	Georgian	Male	
Grigory Petrovsky	Григо́рій Петро́вський	Old	Reelected	1878	1958	1898	Ukrainian	Male	Grigory Petrovsky
Osip Piatnitsky	Осип Пятницкий	Old	Reelected	1882	1938	1898	Jewish	Male	Osip Piatnitsky
Pavel Postyshev	Григо́рій Петро́вський	Old	Reelected	1887	1939	1904	Russian	Male	a man with wavy but well kept hair, bearded, smiling to the camera, wearing a black but stripped suit, a white shirt and a coloured tie
Georgy Pyatakov	Георгий Пятаков	New	Reelected	1890	1939	1910	Russian	Male	Georgy Pyatakov
Jānis Rudzutaks	Ян Рудзутак	Old	Reelected	1887	1938	1905	Latvian	Male	Jānis Rudzutaks
Moisei Rukhimovich	Моисей Рухимович	Old	Reelected	1889	1938	1913	Russian	Male	
Ivan Rumyantsev	Иван Румянцев	Old	Reelected	1886	1937	1905	Russian	Male	
Alexei Rykov	Алексей Рыков	Old	Candidate	1881	1938	1898	Russian	Male	Alexei Rykov
Kuzma Ryndin	Кузьма Рындин	Candidate	Reelected	1893	1938	1915	Russian	Male	
Isaak Schwartz	Исаак Шварц	Old	Candidate	1879	1951	1899	Jewish	Male	
Boris Sheboldayev	Борис Шеболдаев	New	Reelected	1895	1937	1914	Russian	Male	
Nikolay Shvernik	Николай Шверник	Old	Reelected	1888	1970	1905	Russian	Male	Nikolay Shvernik
Mykola Skrypnyk	Микола Скрипник	Old	Died	1872	1933	1898	Ukrainian	Male	a photograph of Mykola Skrypnyk, taken in 1933
Alexander Smirnov	Александр Смирно	Old	Removed	1878	1938	1898	Russian	Male	
Joseph Stalin	Ио́сиф Ста́лин	Old	Reelected	1878	1953	1898	Georgian	Male	
Aleksei Stetskii	Алексей Стецкий	Old	Reelected	1896	1938	1915	Russian	Male	
Konstantin Strievsky	Константин Стриевский	Old	Candidate	1885	1938	1902	Belarusian	Male	
Daniil Sulimov	Даниил Сулимов	Old	Reelected	1890	1937	1905	Russian	Male	
Sergei Syrtsov	Сергей Сырцов	Old	Removed	1893	1937	1913	Russian	Male	
Aleksandr Tolokontsev	Александр Толоконцев	Old	Not	1889	1937	1914	Russian	Male	
Mikhail Tomsky	Михаил Томский	Old	Candidate	1880	1936	1904	Russian	Male	
Anton Tsikhon	Антон Цихон	Candidate	Not	1887	1939	1906	Russian	Male	
Konstantin Ukhanov	Константин Уханов	Old	Reelected	1891	1937	1907	Russian	Male	
Iosif Vareikis	Иосиф Варейкис	Old	Reelected	1894	1938	1913	Lithuanian	Male	
Kliment Voroshilov	Климент Ворошилов	Old	Reelected	1881	1969	1903	Russian	Male	
Yakov Yakovlev	Я́ков Я́ковлев	New	Reelected	1896	1938	1913	Jewish	Male	Yakov Yakovlev
Isaak Zelensky	Исаак Зеленский	Old	Reelected	1890	1937	1906	Jewish	Male	
Andrei Zhdanov	Андрей Жданов	Candidate	Reelected	1896	1948	1915	Russian	Male	
Ivan Zhukov	Иван Жуков	Old	Reelected	1889	1937	1909	Russian	Male	

=== Candidates ===
Candidate Members of the Central Committee of the 16th Congress of the All-Union Communist Party (Bolsheviks)
Name	Cyrillic	15th CC	17th CC	Birth	Death	PM	Nationality	Gender	Portrait
Stepan Afanasyev	Степан Афанасьев	New	Not	1894	1965	1912	Russian	Male	
Aleksey Amosov	Алексей Амосов	New	Not	1896	1937	1914	Russian	Male	
Naum Antselovich	Наум Анцелович	New	Not	1895	1971	1905	Russian	Male	
Pyotr Baranov	Пётр Баранов	Candidate	Died	1892	1933	1912	Russian	Male	
Sergei Bergavinov	Сергей Бергавинов	New	Not	1889	1937	1917	Russian	Male	
Nikolai Bryukhanov	Николай Брюханов	Candidate	Not	1878	1938	1902	Russian	Male	
Ivan Bulat	Иван Булат	New	Not	1896	1938	1912	Ukrainian	Male	
Dmitry Bulatov	Дмитрий Булатов	New	Not	1889	1941	1912	Russian	Male	
Anton Bulin	Антон Булин	New	Candidate	1894	1938	1914	Russian	Male	
Nikolai Chaplin	Николай Чаплин	Candidate	Not	1902	1938	1919	Russian	Male	
Sergey Chutskayev	Сергей Чуцкаев	Candidate	Not	1876	1944	1903	Russian	Male	
Alexander Dogadov	Александр Догадов	Member	Not	1888	1937	1905	Russian	Male	
Shalva Eliava	Шалва Элиава	Candidate	Candidate	1883	1937	1904	Georgian	Male	Shalva Eliava
Konstantin Gey	Константин Гей	Candidate	Not	1896	1939	1916	Russian	Male	
Nikolay Goloded	Николай Голодед	New	Not	1894	1937	1918	Belarusian	Male	
Fyodor Gryadinsky	Фёдор Грядинский	Candidate	Candidate	1893	1938	1912	Russian	Male	
Akmal Ikramov	Акмаль Икрамов	Candidate	Member	1898	1938	1918	Uzbek	Male	
Uraz Isayev	Ураз Исаев	New	Member	1899	1938	1920	Kazakh	Male	
Vladimir Ivanov	Владимир Иванов	Candidate	Member	1893	1938	1915	Russian	Male	
Mikhail Kakhiani	Михаил Кахиани	New	Not	1896	1937	1917	Georgian	Male	
Anna Kalgyna	Анна Калыгина	Candidate	Candidate	1895	1937	1915	Russian	Female	
Moisei Kalmanovich	Моисей Калманович	New	Candidate	1888	1937	1917	Russian	Male	
Grigory Kaminsky	Григорий Каминский	Candidate	Candidate	1895	1938	1913	Jewish	Male	Grigory Kaminsky
Lavrentiy Kartvelishvili	Лаврентий Картвелишвили	New	Member	1890	1938	1910	Georgian	Male	
Mikhail Khloplyankin	Михаил Хлоплянкин	New	Not	1892	1938	1914	Russian	Male	
Aleksei Kiselyov	Алексей Киселёв	Candidate	Not	1879	1937	1898	Russian	Male	
Ivan Klimenko	Иван Клименко	Candidate	Not	1891	1937	1912	Russian	Male	
Alexander Kosarev	Александр Косарев	New	Member	1903	1939	1919	Russian	Male	
Ivan Kozlov	Иван Козлов	New	Not	1883	1970	1918	Russian	Male	
Alexander Krinitsky	Александр Криницкий	Candidate	Not	1894	1937	1915	Russian	Male	
Vasily Kuritsyn	Василий Курицын	New	Candidate	1892	1937	1917	Russian	Male	
Solomon Lozovsky	Соломон Лозовский	Candidate	Candidate	1892	1952	1901	Russian	Male	
Valery Mezhlauk	Валерий Межлаук	Candidate	Member	1893	1938	1917	Latvian	Male	Valery Mezhlauk
Vasily Mikhailov	Василий Михайлов	Member	Candidate	1894	1937	1915	Russian	Male	
Mikhail Mikhailov-Ivanov	Михаил Михайлов-Иванов	Candidate	Died	1894	1931	1913	Russian	Male	
Levon Mirzoyan	Левон Мирзоян	Candidate	Member	1887	1939	1917	Armenian	Male	Levon Mirzoyan
Gazanfar Musabekov	Газанфар Мусабеков	Candidate	Candidate	1888	1938	1918	Azerbaijani	Male	
Klavdiya Nikolayeva	Клавдия Николаева	Candidate	Member	1893	1944	1909	Russian	Female	
Valerian Osinsky	Валериан Оболенский	Candidate	Candidate	1887	1938	1907	Russian	Male	
Mikhail Oshvintsev	Михаил Ошвинцев	Candidate	Not	1889	1939	1917	Russian	Male	
Nikolay Pakhomov	Николай Пахомов	New	Candidate	1890	1938	1917	Russian	Male	
Ivan Perepechko	Иван Перепечко	New	Not	1897	1943	1914	Ukrainian	Male	
Vladimir Polonsky	Владимир Полонский	Candidate	Not	1893	1937	1912	Russian	Male	
Nikolai Popov	Николай Попов	New	Candidate	1890	1938	1919	Russian	Male	
Boris Pozern	Борис Позерн	New	Candidate	1882	1939	1902	Russian	Male	Boris Pozern
Vladimir Ptukha	Владимир Птуха	New	Candidate	1894	1938	1917	Ukrainian	Male	Vladimir Ptukha
Konstantin Rumyantsev	Константин Румянцев	Candidate	Died	1891	1932	1916	Russian	Male	
Maximilian Saveliev	Максимилиа́н Саве́льев	New	Not	1898	1939	1903	Russian	Male	
Vasily Schmidt	Василий Шмидт	Candidate	Not	1886	1938	1905	German	Male	Vasily Schmidt
Alexei Sedelnikov	Алексей Седельников	New	Candidate	1894	1938	1914	Russian	Male	
Boris Semenov	Борис Семёнов	Candidate	Candidate	1890	1937	1907	Russian	Male	
Alexander Serebrovsky	Александр Серебровский	Candidate	Candidate	1884	1938	1903	Russian	Male	
Pyotr Smorodin	Пётр Смородин	New	Candidate	1897	1939	1917	Russian	Male	Pyotr Smorodin
Grigori Sokolnikov	Григорий Сокольников	Member	Candidate	1888	1939	1905	Jewish	Male	
Vasily Stroganov	Василий Строганов	Candidate	Not	1888	1938	1905	Russian	Male	
Kirill Sukhomlin	Кирилл Сухомлин	Candidate	Not	1886	1938	1905	Russian	Male	
Roman Terekhov	Роман Терехов	New	Not	1889	1979	1912	Russian	Male	
Fyodor Tsarkov	Фёдор Царьков	New	Not	1888	1938	1906	Russian	Male	
Ieronim Uborevich	Иероним Уборевич	New	Candidate	1896	1937	1917	Lithuanian	Male	Ieronim Uborevich
Józef Unszlicht	Ио́сиф У́ншлихт	Candidate	Candidate	1879	1938	1900	Polish	Male	Józef Unszlicht
Mikhail Uryvayev	Михаил Урываев	Candidate	Not	1887	1937	1917	Russian	Male	
Gavrii Veynberg	Гавриил Вейнберг	Candidate	Candidate	1891	1946	1906	Polish	Male	
Pyotr Volkov	Пётр Волков	New	Not	1896	1937	1917	Russian	Male	
Genrikh Yagoda	Генрих Ягода	New	Member	1891	1938	1907	Russian	Male	Genrikh Yagoda
Iona Yakir	Иона Якир	New	Candidate	1896	1937	1917	Moldovan	Male	
Voronova Yakovlevna	Пелагея Воронова	New	Not	1892	1990	1917	Russian	Female	
Tikhon Yurkin	Тихон Юркин	New	Candidate	1898	1986	1915	Russian	Male	
