= Central Committee of the 17th Congress of the All-Union Communist Party (Bolsheviks) =

Central Committee of the 17th Congress
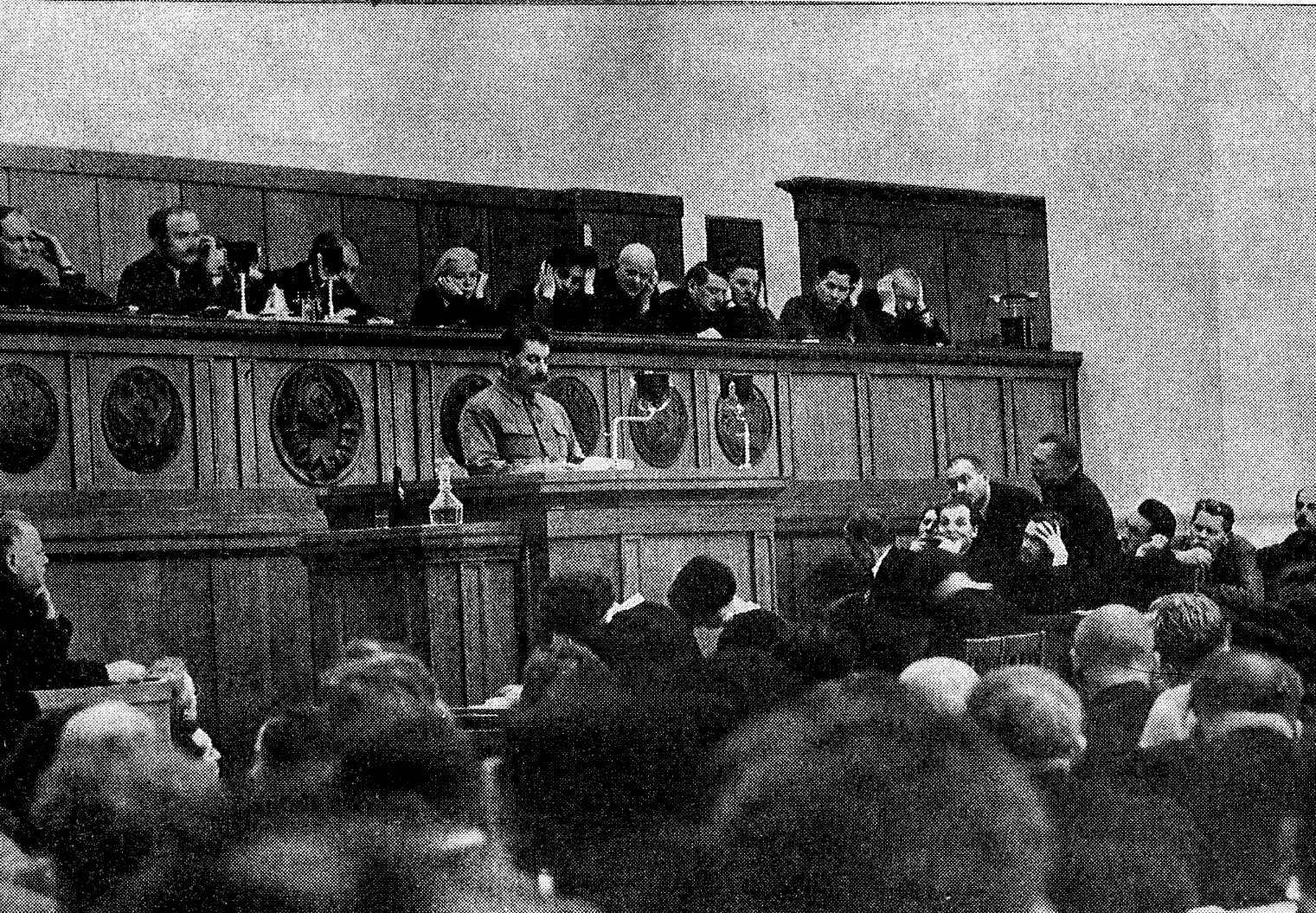
- A scene from the 17th Congress

10 February 1934 – 22 March 1939

Leadership
- General Secretary: Joseph Stalin
- Second Secretary: Lazar Kaganovich (1934–1935)
- Inner-groups: Politburo: 12 full & 5 candidates Secretariat: 6 members Orgburo: 12 full & 2 candidates

Candidates

Apparatus
- No. of departments: 12

The Central Committee of the 17th Congress of the All-Union Communist Party (Bolsheviks) sat from 10 February 1934 until the convening of the 18th Congress on 10 March 1939. Its 1st Plenary Session elected the Politburo, Secretariat and Orgburo. The 17th Congress was labelled the "Congress of Victors" to mark the success of the first five-year plan and the collectivization of agriculture. The CC 1st Plenary Session elected Joseph Stalin General Secretary of the Central Committee, and Lazar Kaganovich continued to serve as Stalin's deputy, an informal post referred to by Sovietologists as Second Secretary, and was empowered to manage party business and sign Politburo resolutions when Stalin was away from Moscow.

This Central Committee composition saw the de-formalisation of politics; for example, the number of Politburo meetings was reduced to 16 for the year of 1934. Politburo decisions were made either by polling the members or informal meeting between Stalin and other Politburo members. According to Ukrainian historian Oleg Khlevniuk the "procedures followed by the Politburo became increasingly simplified as it was transformed from a collective body into an appendage of a decision-making system that rested on Stalin's sole authority. According to Vadim Rogovin, "During the period of the Great Purge, the rights of the Central Committee and its members were restricted even more", noting that CC members lost the right to attend Politburo sessions or being informed on the decisions taken by the Politburo, Secretariat or the Orgburo. When looking back, Nikita Khrushchev lamented the situation; "by 1938, the earlier democracy in the Central Committee had already been greatly undermined. For instance, as a candidate member of the Politburo, I did not receive materials of our sessions. ... I received only the material which Stalin sent to me on his own orders."

Of the 139 full members and candidate members elected at the 17th Party Congress, 98 people were killed in the period 1936–1940. Of these 44 (out of 71) were full members, while 55 (out of 68) were candidate members. Of those arrested, over 80 percent of them were below the age of 50. When the 18th Party Congress convened in 1939, 31 individuals remained in the Central Committee. Of these, seven were not reelected, and of them five were pensioned or relieved of leading offices (Grigory Petrovsky, Gleb Krzhizhanovsky, Grigory Broydo, Mikhail Chuvyrin and Isaak Schwartz) while Tikhon Yurkin and Avraami Zavenyagin were reelected to the CC at the 19th Party Congress (in 1952) and the 20th Party Congress (in 1956) respectively. Of the 24 reelected at the 18th Party Congress, four would be subject to violent repression (Mikhail Kaganovich in 1941, Solomon Lozovsky in 1952, Lavrentiy Beria in 1953 and Mir Jafar Baghirov in 1956). Klavdiya Nikolayeva became the only CC member who had previously been active in intra-party opposition to survive the purge.

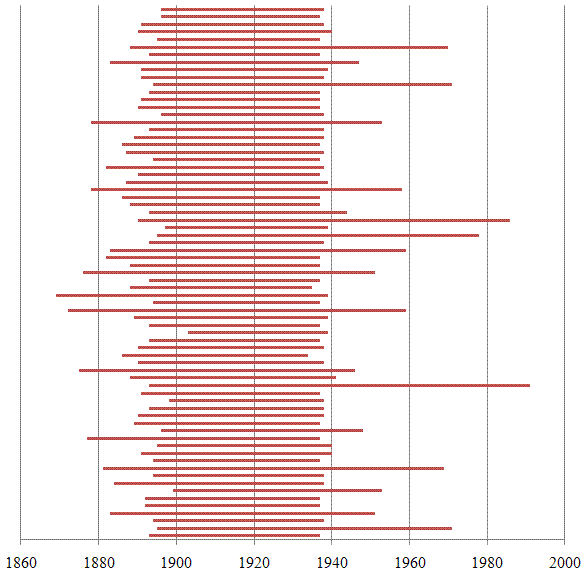
Life durations of members of Central Committee chosen on the 17th Congress of the All-Union Communist Party (Bolsheviks)

When asked in an interview how the Central Committee approved its own destruction (the decision to expel a member from the CC or for a member to be arrested by the authorities had to be approved by the CC itself through a plenary session), Vyacheslav Molotov replied; "In the first place, on democratic centralism—Listen, it did not happen that a minority expelled a majority. It happened gradually. Seventy expelled 10–15 people, then 60 expelled another 15. All in line with majority and minority. ... Essentially, it happened that a minority of the composition of the TsK [CC] remained of this majority, but without formal violation [of democratic centralism]." According to J. Arch Getty and Oleg Naumov the CC "In the name of party unity and with a desperate feeling of corporate self-preservation, the nomenklatura committed suicide." However, there were some within the CC who breached party tradition and spoke against the purges, such as Grigory Kaminsky and Osip Piatnitsky for example.

== Plenums ==
The CC was not a permanent institution. The CC was convened for fourteen plenary sessions between the 17th Congress and the 18th Congress. When the CC was not in session, decision-making powers were transferred to inner bodies of the CC itself; the Politburo, Secretariat and Orgburo (none of these bodies were permanent either, but convened to decide on crucial matters).

Plenary sessions of the Central Committee
Plenum	Date	Length
1st Plenary Session	10 February 1934	1 day
2nd Plenary Session	29 June – 1 July 1934	3 days
3rd Plenary Session	25–28 November 1934	4 days
4th Plenary Session	1 February 1935	1 day
5th Plenary Session	28 February 1935	1 day
6th Plenary Session	5–7 June 1935	3 days
7th Plenary Session	21–25 December 1935	5 days
8th Plenary Session	1–4 June 1936	4 days
9th Plenary Session	4, 7 July 1936	2 days
10th Plenary Session	23 February – 5 March 1937	12 days
11th Plenary Session	26–29 June 1937	4 days
12th Plenary Session	11–12 October 1937	2 days
13th Plenary Session	11, 14, 18, 20 January 1938	4 days
14th Plenary Session	9–11 January 1938	3 days

== Apparatus ==
Individuals employed by Central Committee's bureaus, departments and newspapers made up the apparatus between the 17th Congress and the 18th Congress. The bureaus and departments were supervised by the Secretariat, and each secretary (member of the Secretariat) supervised a specific department. The leaders of departments were officially referred to as Heads, while the titles of bureau leaders varied between chairman, first secretary and secretary.

Central Committee Apparatus of the 17th Congress of the All-Union Communist Party (Bolsheviks)
Institution	Leader	Cyrillic	Took office	Left office	Length of tenure	Nationality	Gender
Administrator of Affairs	Timofey Samsonov	Тимофей Самсонов	10 February 1934	1935	1 year and 111 days	Russian	Male
Administrator of Affairs	Ivan Lychov	Иван Лычев	1935	May 1938	3 years and 120 days	Russian	Male
Administrator of Affairs	Dmitry Krupin	Дмитрий Крупин	May 1938	22 March 1939	325 days	Russian	Male
Agriculture Department	Andrei Zhdanov	Андрей Жданов	3 March 1934	10 April 1934	38 days	Russian	Male
Agriculture Department	Yakov Yakovlev	Я́ков Я́ковлев	10 April 1934	1936	2 years and 52 days	Jewish	Male
Bolshevik	Aleksei Stetskii	Алексе́й Сте́цкий	10 February 1934	26 April 1938	4 years and 55 days	Ukrainian	Male
Cultural and Educational Work Department	Alexander Shcherbakov	Алекса́ндр Щербако́в	13 May 1935	1936	1 year and 19 days	Russian	Male
Cultural and Educational Work Department	Aleksey Angarov	Алексей Ангаров	1936	July 1937	1 year and 30 days	Russian	Male
Industrial Department	Nikolai Yezhov	Николай Ежов	3 March 1934	3 March 1935	1 year and 0 days	Russian	Male
Industrial Department	Andrey Andreyev	Андрей Андреев	3 March 1935	13 May 1937	2 years and 71 days	Russian	Male
Industrial Department	Mikhail Tselishev	Михаил Целищев	13 May 1937	September 1937	111 days	Russian	Male
Leninist Culture and Propaganda Department	Aleksei Stetskii	Алексей Стецкий	10 February 1934	13 May 1935	1 year and 92 days	Russian	Male
Planning, Finance and Trade Department	Andrei Zhdanov	Андрей Жданов	10 April 1934	1934	235 days	Russian	Male
Planning, Finance and Trade Department	Karl Bauman	Карл Бауман	1934	20 January 1938	4 years and 19 days	Latvian	Male
Political-Administrative Department	Yakov Brezanovsky	Яков Брезановский	10 March 1934	February 1935	328 days	Polish	Male
Political-Administrative Department	Osip Piatnitsky	Осип Пятницкий	19 August 1935	7 July 1937	1 year and 322 days	Russian	Male
Pravda	Lev Mekhlis	Лев Мехлис	10 February 1934	4 September 1937	3 years and 206 days	Jewish	Male
Press and Publications Department	Boris Tal	Борис Таль	13 May 1935	4 September 1937	2 years and 114 days	Azerbaijani	Male
Press and Publications Department	Lev Mekhlis	Лев Мехлис	4 September 1937	2 January 1938	120 days	Jewish	Male
Press and Publications Department	Alexander Niktin	Александр Никитин	2 January 1938	21 November 1938	323 days	Russian	Male
Propaganda Department	Aleksei Stetskii	Алексей Стецкий	13 May 1935	26 April 1938	2 years and 348 days	Russian	Male
Propaganda Department	Andrei Zhdanov	Андрей Жданов	21 November 1938	22 March 1939	121 days	Russian	Male
Science and Scientific-technological Discoveries Department	Karl Bauman	Карл Бауман	13 May 1935	14 April 1937	1 year and 336 days	Latvian	Male
School Department	Boris Volin	Борис Волин	13 May 1935	1936	1 year and 19 days	Russian	Male
Special Sector	Alexander Poskrebyshev	Александр Поскрёбышев	10 February 1934	22 March 1939	5 years and 40 days	Russian	Male
Transportation Department	Lazar Kaganovich	Лазарь Каганович	10 March 1934	9 July 1935	1 year and 121 days	Jewish	Male
Transportation Department	Nikolai Zimin	Николай Зимин	9 July 1935	10 September 1938	3 years and 63 days	Russian	Male

== Composition ==
=== Members ===
Members of the Central Committee of the 17th Congress of the All-Union Communist Party (Bolsheviks)
Name	Cyrillic	16th CC	18th CC	Birth	Death	PM	Nationality	Gender	Portrait
Pyotr Alexeyev	Пётр Алексеев	Old	Removed	1877	1936	1914	Russian	Male	—
Andrey Andreyev	Андрей Андреев	Old	Reelected	1895	1971	1914	Russian	Male	
Nikolay Antipov	Николай Антипов	Old	Removed	1894	1938	1912	Russian	Male	
Aleksei Badayev	Алексей Бадаев	Old	Reelected	1883	1951	1904	Russian	Male	
Mir Jafar Baghirov	Мир Багиров	Promoted	Reelected	1896	1956	1917	Azerbaijani	Male	
Vsevolod Balitsky	Всеволод Балицкий	New	Removed	1892	1937	1915	Ukrainian	Male	
Karl Bauman	Карл Бауман	Old	Removed	1892	1937	1907	Latvian	Male	—
Lavrentiy Beria	Лавре́нтий Бе́рия	New	Reelected	1899	1953	1917	Georgian	Male	
Vasily Blyukher	Василий Блюхер	Promoted	Arrested	1899	1938	1916	Russian	Male	
Andrei Bubnov	Андрей Бубнов	Old	Removed	1884	1938	1903	Russian	Male	Andrei Bubnov
Nikolai Bulganin	Николай Булганин	Promoted	Reelected	1895	1975	1917	Russian	Male	Nikolai Bulganin
Anton Bulin	Антон Булин	Promoted	Removed	1894	1938	1914	Russian	Male	—
Mikhail Chernov	Михаил Чернов	New	Removed	1891	1938	1920	Ukrainian	Male	
Vlas Chubar	Влас Чубар	Old	Arrested	1891	1939	1907	Ukrainian	Male	Vlas Chubar
Mikhail Chudov	Михаил Чудов	Old	Removed	1893	1937	1913	Russian	Male	—
Mikhail Chuvyrin	Михаил Чувырин	Old	Not	1883	1947	1903	Russian	Male	—
Robert Eikhe	Роберт Эйхе	Old	Arrested	1890	1940	1905	Latvian	Male	
Avel Enukidze	А́вель Енуки́дзе	Old	Removed	1877	1937	1898	Georgian	Male	—
Yan Gamarnik	Ян Гамарник	Old	Suicide	1894	1937	1916	Jewish	Male	—
Vladimir Ivanov	Владимир Иванов	Candidate	Removed	1893	1938	1915	Russian	Male	
Akmal Ikramov	Акмаль Икрамов	Candidate	Removed	1898	1938	1918	Uzbek	Male	
Uraz Isayev	Ураз Исаев	Candidate	Removed	1899	1938	1920	Kazakh	Male	—
Ivan Kabakov	Иван Кабаков	Old	Removed	1891	1937	1914	Russian	Male	—
Lazar Kaganovich	Лазарь Каганович	Old	Reelected	1893	1991	1911	Jewish	Male	
Mikhail Kaganovich	Михаил Каганович	New	Reelected	1888	1941	1905	Jewish	Male	
Mikhail Kalinin	Михаил Калинин	Old	Reelected	1875	1946	1898	Russian	Male	Mikhail Kalinin
Lavrentiy Kartvelishvili	Лаврентий Картвелишвили	Candidate	Removed	1890	1938	1910	Georgian	Male	
Mendel Khatayevich	Мендель Хатаевич	Old	Removed	1893	1937	1913	Russian	Male	Mendel Khatayevich
Nikita Khrushchev	Никита Хрущёв	New	Reelected	1894	1971	1918	Russian	Male	
Sergey Kirov	Серге́й Ки́ров	Old	Murder	1886	1934	1904	Russian	Male	
Vilhelm Knorin	Вильгельм Кнорин	Old	Removed	1890	1938	1910	Latvian	Male	
Ivan Kodatsky	Иван Кодацкий	Old	Removed	1893	1937	1914	Ukrainian	Male	
Alexander Kosarev	Александр Косарев	Candidate	Arrested	1903	1939	1919	Russian	Male	
Joseph Kosior	Иосиф Косиор	Old	Died	1889	1937	1908	Polish	Male	
Stanislav Kosior	Станислав Косиор	Old	Arrested	1889	1939	1907	Polish	Male	Stanislav Kosior
Nadezhda Krupskaya	Наде́жда Кру́пская	Old	Died	1869	1939	1898	Russian	Female	a photograph of Nadezhda Krupskaya, the date the photograph was taken in 1924
Alexander Krinitsky	Александр Криницкий	Candidate	Removed	1894	1937	1915	Russian	Male	Alexander Krinitsky
Gleb Krzhizhanovsky	Глеб Кржижано́вский	Old	Not	1872	1959	1898	Russian	Male	Gleb Krzhizhanovsky
Mikhail Kulkov	Михаил Кульков	Promoted	Removed	1891	1939	1915	Russian	Male	—
Valerian Kuybyshev	Валериан Куйбышев	Old	Died	1888	1935	1904	Russian	Male	Valerian Kuybyshev
Dmitry Lebed	Дмитрий Лебедь	Old	Removed	1893	1937	1904	Russian	Male	
Maxim Litvinov	Макси́м Литви́нов	New	Reelected	1876	1951	1898	Lithuanian	Male	Maxim Litvinov
Semyon Lobov	Семён Лобов	Old	Removed	1888	1937	1913	Russian	Male	—
Solomon Lozovsky	Соломон Лозовский	Promoted	Reelected	1892	1952	1901	Jewish	Male	
Isidor Lyubimov	Исидор Любимов	Old	Removed	1882	1937	1902	Russian	Male	—
Ivan Makarov	Иван Макаров	Promoted	Candidate	1888	1949	1905	Russian	Male	—
Dmitry Manuilsky	Дмитро Мануїльський	Old	Reelected	1883	1959	1903	Ukrainian	Male	
Lev Mekhlis	Лев Ме́хлис	Promoted	Reelected	1889	1953	1918	Jewish	Male	Lev Mekhlis
Valery Mezhlauk	Валерий Межлаук	Candidate	Removed	1893	1938	1917	Latvian	Male	Valery Mezhlauk
Mikhail Mikhailov	Михаил Михайлов	Promoted	Removed	1902	1938	1919	Russian	Male	—
Anastas Mikoyan	Анаста́с Микоя́н	Old	Reelected	1895	1978	1915	Armenian	Male	
Levon Mirzoyan	Левон Мирзоян	New	Arrested	1887	1939	1917	Armenian	Male	Levon Mirzoyan
Vyacheslav Molotov	Вячеслав Молотов	Old	Reelected	1890	1986	1906	Russian	Male	
Klavdiya Nikolayeva	Клавдия Николаева	New	Reelected	1893	1944	1909	Russian	Female	
Ivan Nosov	Иван Носов	Old	Removed	1888	1937	1905	Russian	Male	—
Grigol Ordzhonikidze	Григо́рий Орджоники́дзе	Old	Suicide	1886	1937	1903	Georgian	Male	
Nikolay Pakhomov	Николай Пахомов	Candidate	Removed	1890	1938	1912	Russian	Male	
Grigory Petrovsky	Григо́рій Петро́вський	Old	Not	1878	1958	1898	Ukrainian	Male	Grigory Petrovsky
Osip Piatnitsky	Осип Пятницкий	Old	Removed	1882	1938	1898	Russian	Male	Osip Piatnitsky
Pavel Postyshev	Григо́рій Петро́вський	Old	Arrested	1887	1939	1904	Russian	Male	a man with wavy but well kept hair, bearded, smiling to the camera, wearing a black but stripped suit, a white shirt and a coloured tie
Eduard Pramnek	Эдуард Прамнэк	Promoted	Removed	1899	1938	1917	Lithuanian	Male	
Georgy Pyatakov	Георгий Пятаков	Old	Arrested	1890	1937	1910	Russian	Male	Georgy Pyatakov
Mikhail Razumov	Михаил Разумов	New	Removed	1894	1937	1913	Ukrainian	Male	—
Jānis Rudzutaks	Ян Рудзутак	Old	Removed	1887	1938	1905	Latvian	Male	Jānis Rudzutaks
Moisei Rukhimovich	Моисей Рухимович	Old	Removed	1889	1938	1913	Russian	Male	
Ivan Rumyantsev	Иван Румянцев	Old	Removed	1886	1937	1905	Russian	Male	
Kuzma Ryndin	Кузьма Рындин	Old	Removed	1893	1938	1915	Russian	Male	—
Boris Sheboldayev	Борис Шеболдаев	Old	Removed	1895	1937	1914	Russian	Male	
Nikolai Shvernik	Николай Шверник	Old	Reelected	1888	1970	1905	Russian	Male	grayscale photo of Nikolay Shvernik
Pyotr Smorodin	Пётр Смородин	Promoted	Removed	1897	1938	1917	Russian	Male	Pyotr Smorodin
Joseph Stalin	Ио́сиф Ста́лин	Old	Reelected	1878	1953	1898	Georgian	Male	
Aleksei Stetskii	Алексей Стецкий	Old	Arrested	1896	1938	1915	Russian	Male	
Daniil Sulimov	Даниил Сулимов	Old	Removed	1890	1937	1905	Russian	Male	
Aleksandr Ugarov	Александр Угаров	Promoted	Removed	1900	1939	1917	Russian	Male	
Konstantin Ukhanov	Константин Уханов	Old	Removed	1891	1937	1907	Russian	Male	
Iosif Vareikis	Иосиф Варейкис	Old	Removed	1894	1938	1913	Lithuanian	Male	—
Kliment Voroshilov	Климент Ворошилов	Old	Reelected	1881	1969	1903	Russian	Male	
Yakov Yakovlev	Я́ков Я́ковлев	Old	Removed	1896	1938	1913	Jewish	Male	Yakov Yakovlev
Genrikh Yagoda	Генрих Ягода	Candidate	Removed	1891	1938	1907	Russian	Male	Genrikh Yagoda
Iona Yakir	Иона Якир	Candidate	Removed	1896	1937	1917	Moldovan	Male	
Yefim Yevdokimov	Ефи́м Евдоки́мов	New	Arrested	1891	1940	1918	Russian	Male	
Nikolai Yezhov	Николай Ежов	New	Not	1895	1940	1917	Russian	Male	
Isaak Zelensky	Исаак Зеленский	Old	Removed	1890	1937	1906	Jewish	Male	
Andrei Zhdanov	Андрей Жданов	Old	Reelected	1896	1948	1915	Russian	Male	Andrei Zhdanov
Ivan Zhukov	Иван Жуков	Old	Removed	1889	1937	1909	Russian	Male	—

=== Candidates ===
Candidate Members of the Central Committee of the 17th Congress of the All-Union Communist Party (Bolsheviks)
Name	Cyrillic	16th CC	18th CC	Birth	Death	PM	Nationality	Gender	Portrait
Mir Jafar Baghirov	Мир Багиров	New	Promoted	1896	1956	1917	Azerbaijani	Male	
Georgy Blagonravov	Георгий Благонравов	New	Removed	1896	1938	1917	Russian	Male	
Vasily Blyukher	Георгий Благонравов	New	Promoted	1890	1938	1916	Russian	Male	
Grigory Broydo	Григорий Бройдо	New	Not	1883	1956	1918	Russian	Male	
Semyon Budyonny	Семён Будённый	New	Member	1883	1973	1919	Russian	Male	
Nikolai Bukharin	Никола́й Буха́рин	Member	Removed	1888	1938	1906	Russian	Male	Nikolai Bukharin
Nikolai Bulganin	Николай Булганин	New	Promoted	1895	1975	1917	Russian	Male	Nikolai Bulganin
Anton Bulin	Антон Булин	New	Promoted	1894	1938	1914	Russian	Male	—
Yakov Bykin	Яков Быкин	New	Removed	1888	1938	1912	Jewish	Male	
Nikolai Demchenko	Николай Демченко	New	Removed	1896	1937	1916	Ukrainian	Male	—
Terenty Deribas	Терентий Дерибас	New	Removed	1896	1937	1903	Russian	Male	
Shalva Eliava	Шалва Элиава	Candidate	Removed	1883	1937	1904	Georgian	Male	Shalva Eliava
Nikolai Filatov	Николай Филатов	New	Removed	1891	1939	1912	Russian	Male	—
Nikolai Gikalo	Николай Гикало	New	Removed	1897	1938	1917	Ukrainian	Male	
Nikolay Goloded	Николай Голодед	Candidate	Removed	1894	1937	19181	Belarusian	Male	
Fyodor Gryadinsky	Фёдор Грядинский	Candidate	Removed	1893	1938	1912	Russian	Male	
Hryhoriy Hrynko	Григорий Гринько	New	Removed	1890	1938	1919	Ukrainian	Male	
Uraz Isayev	Ураз Исаев	Candidate	Promoted	1899	1938	1920	Kazakh	Male	—
Anna Kalgyna	Анна Калыгина	Candidate	Removed	1895	1937	1915	Russian	Female	—
Moisei Kalmanovich	Моисей Калманович	Candidate	Removed	1888	1937	1917	Russian	Male	—
Grigory Kaminsky	Григорий Каминский	Candidate	Removed	1895	1938	1913	Ukrainian	Male	Grigory Kaminsky
Nikolay Komarov	Николай Комаров	Member	Removed	1886	1937	1909	Russian	Male	
Nikolay Kubyak	Николай Кубяк	Member	Removed	1881	1937	1898	Russian	Male	
Mikhail Kulkov	Михаил Кульков	New	Removed	1891	1939	1915	Russian	Male	—
Vasily Kuritsyn	Василий Курицын	Candidate	Removed	1892	1937	1917	Russian	Male	—
Alfred Lepa	Альфред Лепа	New	Removed	1892	1937	1914	Latvian	Male	—
Solomon Lozovsky	Соломон Лозовский	Candidate	Promoted	1892	1952	1901	Jewish	Male	
Panas Lyubchenko	Соломон Лозовский	New	Suicide	1897	1937	1913	Ukrainian	Male	Panas Lyubchenko
Ivan Makarov	Иван Макаров	New	Promoted	1888	1949	1905	Russian	Male	—
Lev Mekhlis	Лев Мехлис	New	Promoted	1889	1953	1918	Jewish	Male	Lev Mekhlis
Mikhail Mikhailov	Михаил Михайлов	New	Promoted	1902	1938	1919	Russian	Male	—
Vasily Mikhailov	Василий Михайлов	Candidate	Removed	1894	1937	1915	Russian	Male	
Gazanfar Musabekov	Газанфар Мусабеков	Candidate	Removed	1888	1938	1918	Azerbaijani	Male	
Valerian Osinsky	Валериан Оболенский	Candidate	Removed	1887	1938	1907	Russian	Male	—
Nikolay Pakhomov	Николай Пахомов	Candidate	Promoted	1890	1938	1912	Russian	Male	
Ivan Pavlunovsky	Иван Павлуновский	New	Removed	1888	1937	1905	Russian	Male	—
Vladimir Polonsky	Владимир Полонский	Candidate	Removed	1893	1937	1912	Russian	Male	
Nikolai Popov	Николай Попов	Candidate	Removed	1891	1938	1906	Russian	Male	—
Alexander Poskrebyshev	Александр Поскрёбышев	New	Member	1891	1965	1917	Russian	Male	—
Boris Pozern	Борис Позерн	Candidate	Arrested	1882	1939	1902	Russian	Male	Boris Pozern
Eduard Pramnek	Эдуард Прамнэк	New	Promoted	1899	1938	1917	Latvian	Male	Eduard Pramnek
Vladimir Ptukha	Владимир Птуха	Candidate	Removed	1894	1938	1917	Ukrainian	Male	Vladimir Ptukha
Arkady Rosengolts	Аркадий Розенгольц	New	Removed	1889	1938	1905	Jewish	Male	
Alexei Rykov	Алексей Рыков	Member	Removed	1881	1938	1898	Russian	Male	Alexei Rykov
Sarkis Sarkisov	Саркис Саркисов	New	Removed	1898	1938	1917	Armenian	Male	Sarkis Sarkisov
Isaak Schwartz	Исаак Шварц	Candidate	Not	1879	1951	1899	Jewish	Male	
Alexei Sedelnikov	Алексей Седельников	Candidate	Removed	1894	1938	1914	Russian	Male	—
Boris Semenov	Борис Семёнов	Candidate	Removed	1890	1937	1907	Russian	Male	—
Alexander Serebrovsky	Александр Серебровский	Candidate	Removed	1884	1938	1903	Russian	Male	
Aleksandr Shteyngart	Александр Штейнгарт	New	Died	1887	1934	1913	Ukrainian	Male	—
Vladimir Shubrikov	Владимир Шубриков	New	Removed	1895	1937	1917	Russian	Male	—
Pyotr Smorodin	Пётр Смородин	Candidate	Promoted	1897	1939	1917	Russian	Male	Pyotr Smorodin
Grigori Sokolnikov	Григорий Сокольников	Candidate	Arrested	1888	1939	1905	Ukrainian	Male	
Konstantin Strievsky	Константин Стриевский	Member	Removed	1885	1938	1902	Belarusian	Male	—
Pyotr Struppe	Пётр Струппе	New	Removed	1889	1937	1907	Russian	Male	Pyotr Struppe
Mikhail Tomsky	Михаил Томский	Member	Suicide	1880	1936	1904	Russian	Male	
Ivan Tovstukha	Иван Товстуха	New	Died	1889	1935	1913	Ukrainian	Male	Ivan Tovstukha
Mikhail Tukhachevsky	Михаи́л Тухаче́вский	New	Arrested	1893	1937	1918	Russian	Male	Mikhail Tukhachevsky
Ieronim Uborevich	Иероним Уборевич	Candidate	Removed	1896	1937	1917	Lithuanian	Male	Ieronim Uborevich
Aleksandr Ugarov	Александр Угаров	New	Promoted	1900	1939	1917	Russian	Male	
Józef Unszlicht	Ио́сиф У́ншлихт	Candidate	Removed	1879	1938	1900	Polish	Male	Józef Unszlicht
Yevgeny Veger	Евгений Вегер	New	Removed	1899	1937	1917	Russian	Male	—
Alexander Yegorov	Александр Егоров	New	Arrested	1883	1939	1918	Russian	Male	
Gavrii Veynberg	Гавриил Вейнберг	Candidate	Candidate	1891	1946	1906	Polish	Male	—
Ivan Yeromin	Иван Ерёмин	New	Removed	1895	1937	1917	Russian	Male	—
Tikhon Yurkin	Тихон Юркин	Candidate	Not	1898	1986	1915	Russian	Male	
Avraami Zavenyagin	Авраамий Завенягин	New	Not	1901	1956	1917	Russian	Male	
Volodymyr Zatonsky	Володи́мир Зато́нський	New	Removed	1888	1938	1917	Ukrainian	Male	Volodymyr Zatonsky
