= Lychev =

Lychev or Lychyov (Russian: Лычёв), feminine: Lycheva or Lychyova is a Russian surname. Notable people with the surname include:

- Grigory Lychyov (1903–1983), Soviet artillery designer
- Ivan Lychev (1881–1972), Soviet politician
- Katya Lycheva (born 1974), best known as a Soviet schoolgirl, a "goodwill ambassador" who visited the United States in 1986
