= 16th Central Committee =

16th Central Committee may refer to:

- Central Committee of the 16th Congress of the All-Union Communist Party (Bolsheviks), 1930–1934
- 16th Central Committee of the Chinese Communist Party, 2002–2007
