= 17th Central Committee =

17th Central Committee may refer to:

- Central Committee of the 17th Congress of the All-Union Communist Party (Bolsheviks), 1934–1939
- 17th Central Committee of the Chinese Communist Party, 2007–2012
