= Secretariat of the 16th Congress of the All-Union Communist Party (Bolsheviks) =

The Secretariat of the 16th Congress of the All-Union Communist Party (Bolsheviks) was in session from 1930 to 1934.

== Composition ==
=== Members ===
Name (birth–death)	Took office	Left office	Duration	Note
Karl Bauman (1892–1937)	13 July 1930	10 February 1932	1 year, 212 days	Relieved of his duties at the 5th Plenary Session.
Lazar Kaganovich (1893–1991)	13 July 1930	10 February 1934	3 years, 212 days	—
Vyacheslav Molotov (1890–1986)	13 July 1930	21 December 1930	161 days	Relieved of his duties at the 3rd Plenary Session.
Pavel Postyshev (1887–1939)	13 July 1930	10 February 1934	3 years, 212 days	—
Joseph Stalin (1878–1953)	13 July 1930	10 February 1934	3 years, 212 days	Elected General Secretary at the 1st Plenary Session.

=== Candidate ===
Name (birth–death)	Took office	Left office	Duration	Note
Ivan Moskvin (1890–1937)	10 February 1932	2 October 1932	2 years, 0 days	Elected at the 5th Plenary Session, and relieved of his duties at the 6th Plenary Session. th Plenary Session.
Nikolay Shvernik (1888–1970)	10 February 1932	10 February 1934	2 years, 0 days	Elected at the 5th Plenary Session.
