= Orgburo of the 16th Congress of the All-Union Communist Party (Bolsheviks) =

Organisational Bureau of Soviet Union (1930–34)

The Orgburo of the 16th Congress of the All-Union Communist Party (Bolsheviks) was in session from 1930 to 1934.

== Composition ==
=== Members ===
Name (birth–death)	Took office	Left office	Duration	Note
Ivan Akulov (1888–1937)	13 July 1930	2 October 1932	2 years, 81 days	Relieved of his duties at the 6th Plenary Session.
Karl Bauman (1892–1937)	13 July 1930	2 October 1932	2 years, 81 days	Relieved of his duties at the 6th Plenary Session.
Andrei Bubnov (1884–1938)	13 July 1930	10 February 1934	3 years, 212 days	—
Yan Gamarnik (1894–1937)	13 July 1930	10 February 1934	3 years, 212 days	—
Lazar Kaganovich (1893–1991)	13 July 1930	10 February 1934	3 years, 212 days	—
Semyon Lobov (1888–1937)	13 July 1930	10 February 1934	3 years, 212 days	—
Vyacheslav Molotov (1890–1986)	13 July 1930	21 December 1930	161 days	Relieved of his duties at the 2nd Plenary Session.
Ivan Moskvin (1890–1937)	13 July 1930	10 February 1934	3 years, 212 days	—
Pavel Postyshev (1890–1937)	13 July 1930	10 February 1934	3 years, 212 days	—
Joseph Stalin (1878–1953)	13 July 1930	10 February 1934	3 years, 212 days	—
Nikolay Shvernik (1888–1970)	13 July 1930	10 February 1934	3 years, 212 days	—

=== Candidate members ===
Name (birth–death)	Took office	Left office	Duration	Note
Alexander Dogadov (1888–1937)	13 July 1930	2 October 1932	2 years, 81 days	Relieved of his duties at the 6th Plenary Session.
Alexander Kosarev (1903–1939)	13 July 1930	10 February 1934	3 years, 212 days	—
Alexander Smirnov (1878–1938)	13 July 1930	12 January 1933	2 years, 183 days	Relieved of his duties at the 2nd Joint Plenary Session of the Central Committee and the Central Control Commission.
Anton Tshikon (1888–1939)	13 July 1930	10 February 1934	3 years, 212 days	—
