= 16th Congress of the All-Union Communist Party (Bolsheviks) =

1930 meeting of Soviet delegates

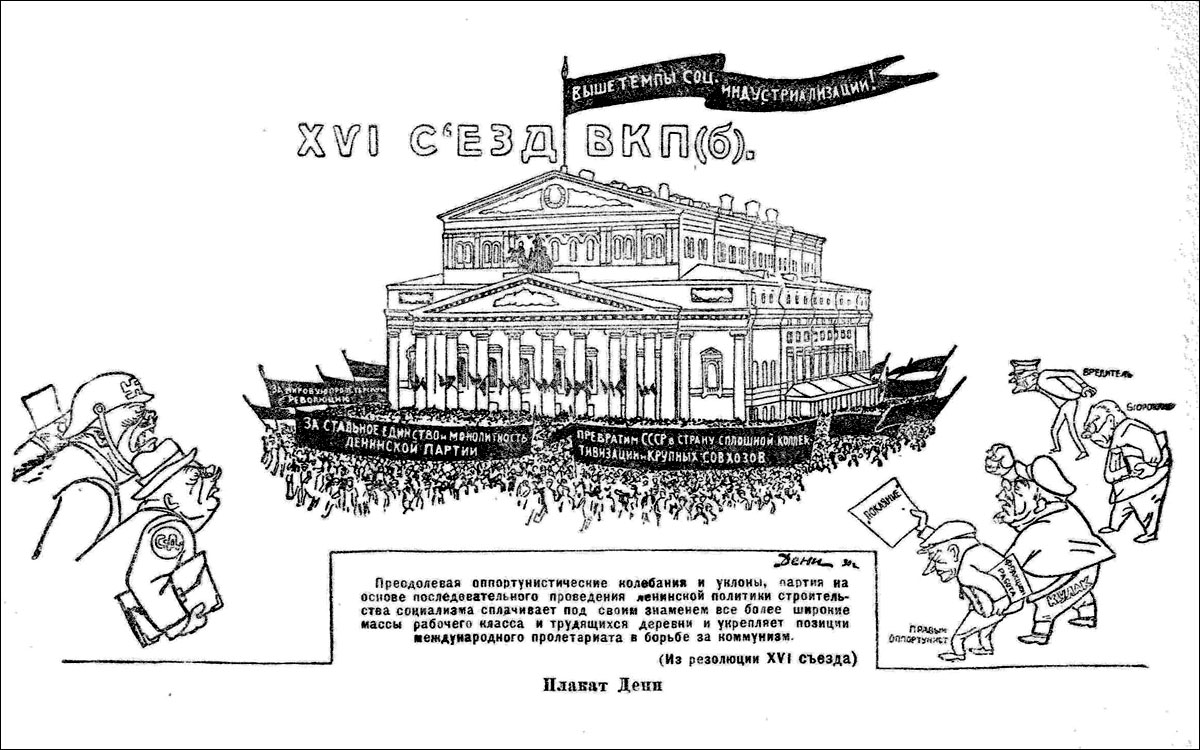
Poster celebrating the 16th Congress of the All-Union Communist Party (Bolsheviks), 1930

The 16th Congress of the All-Union Communist Party (Bolsheviks) was held during 26 June – 13 July 1930 in Moscow. The congress of the All-Union Communist Party (Bolsheviks) was attended by 1,268 voting delegates and 891 delegates with observer status. It elected the 16th Central Committee.

An exercise of devotion to Joseph Stalin, this is the last congress to be dominated by the original leadership of the Soviet Union.

== Agenda of the Congress ==
1. Political report of the Central Committee (Stalin)
2. Organization report of the Central Committee (Kaganovich)
3. Report of the Central Revision Commission (Vladimirsky)
4. Report of the Central Control Commission (Ordzhonikidze)
5. Report of the All-Union Communist Party (Bolsheviks) Delegation to the Comintern (Molotov)
6. Completion of the five-years plan for the industry (Kuybyshev)
7. The Kolkhoz movement and the rise of the agriculture (Yakovlev)
8. Tasks of the trade unions in the reconstruction period (Shvernik)
9. Elections to the Party's central organs

The Sixteenth Congress of the All-Union Communist Party (Bolshevik) focused on accelerating socialist construction and eliminating capitalist elements in the USSR. Key topics included reports from party leaders, industrial and agricultural development, trade union roles, and political purges.

== Key decisions and themes ==
- Industrial Expansion: The congress emphasised rapid industrialisation, surpassing five-year plan targets, and prioritising heavy industry, metallurgy, and technology.
- Agricultural Collectivization: The congress approved full-scale collectivization, consolidating peasant farms into kolkhozes and eliminating the kulaks as a class.
- Political Control & Purges: It reinforced the party’s ideological stance by intensifying struggles against Trotskyism, right-wing deviation, and bureaucratic inefficiency.
- Education & Cultural Revolution: Universal compulsory elementary education and literacy eradication efforts were mandated.
- Strengthening Soviet Defense: A policy of global peace was declared while reinforcing military-industrial capabilities.

The congress went down in history as the “congress of the full-scale socialist offensive on all fronts” setting the stage for further economic and political transformation in the Soviet Union.
