= Boris Pozern =

Russian revolutionary and Soviet politician (1882–1939)

- Борис Позерн
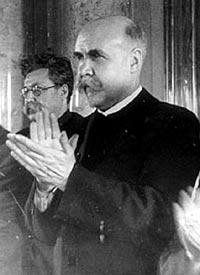

Mayor of Minsk
- In office March 1917 – July 1917
- Preceded by: Vladimir Drutskoy-Sokolninsky
- Succeeded by: Isidor Lyubimov

Personal details
- Born: 7 July 1882 Nizhny Novgorod, Russian Empire (now Nizhny Novgorod Oblast, Russian Federation)
- Died: 25 February 1939 (aged 56) Moscow, Russian SFSR, Soviet Union (now Russia)
- Party: All-Union Communist Party (Bolsheviks)
- Other political affiliations: Russian Social Democratic Labour Party (1903–1917)

Boris Pavlovich Pozern (Russian: Бори́с Па́влович По́зерн; 7 July 1882 – 25 February 1939) was a Soviet politician, party official and member of the Troika of the NKVD of the Soviet Union.

Pozerb was born in Nizhny Novgorod to a noble family of a doctor of German origin. He became a member of the Russian Social Democratic Labour Party in 1903. After the February Revolution, Pozern became the head of the Minsk Soviet.

A member of the Russian Constituent Assembly of 1918. He was a member of the Central Committee of the 17th Congress of the All-Union Communist Party (Bolsheviks). During the Great Purge, he was arrested on 9 July 1938 and later executed by firing squad in Moscow. After the death of Joseph Stalin, he was rehabilitated in 1957.

== Works ==
- Оппозиция на XV партконференции (Opposition at the 15th Party Conference)
- Leningrad, 1925: Pozern et al.: Коммунистическая партия и крестьянство (The Communist Party and the Peasantry)
- Moscow and Leningrad, 1928: Как оппозиция обороняет СССР (How Opposition Defends the U.S.S.R.)
- Leningrad, 1931: Новые задачи и новые условия работы инженерно-технических работников (New Tasks and New Working Conditions for Engineers and Technicians)

== Bibliography ==
- Anatoly Rybakov: Jahre des Terrors. Deutsch von Juri Elperin. 440 pages. Deutscher Taschenbuch Verlag (dtv 11590), Munich, 1992, ISBN 3-423-11590-4
- Handbook of the History of the Communist Party and Soviet Union 1898 - 1991 (in Russian)
- Article title (in Russian)
- http://www.az-libr.ru/index.htm?Persons&FE7/c188733b/index (in Russian)
- Позерн Борис Павлович (in Russian). ХРОНОС: ВСЕМИРНАЯ ИСТОРИЯ В ИНТЕРНЕТЕ.
