= Nikolai Zimin =

Soviet politician

Nikolai Nikolayevich Zimin (Russian: Никола́й Никола́евич Зими́н; 1895 – September 10, 1938) was a Soviet politician. He was of Russian ethnicity. He was a recipient of the Order of Lenin. He was a member of the Central Committee elected by the 17th Congress of the All-Union Communist Party (Bolsheviks). He was appointed head of the Transportation Department on July 9, 1935. During the Great Purge, he was arrested on February 11, 1938, sentenced to death on September 7, 1938, by the Military Collegium of the Supreme Court of the Soviet Union and executed by firing squad three days later. After the death of Joseph Stalin, he was rehabilitated.

== Bibliography ==
- Przewodnik po historii Partii Komunistycznej i ZSRR (ros.)
- http://www.az-libr.ru/index.htm?Persons&70B/b6310cc5/0001/8472b0d7 (ros.)
