= First Congress of Soviet Writers =

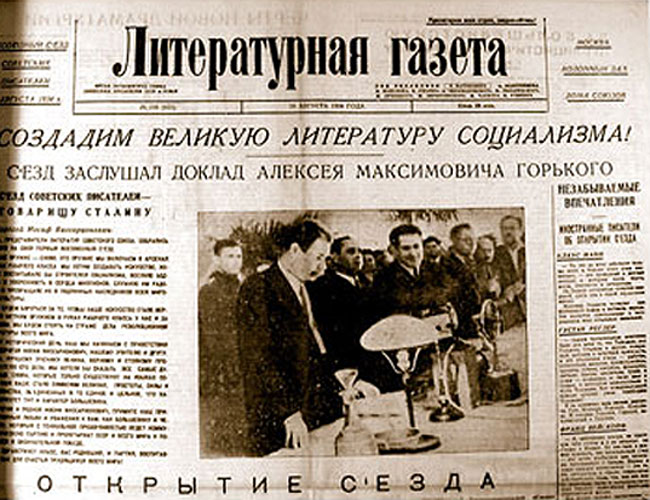
Report on the First Congress of Writers in Literaturnaya Gazeta

The First Congress of Soviet Writers was an all-Union meeting of writers, held in Moscow from August 17 to September 1, 1934, which led to the founding of the Union of Soviet Writers.

It was staged soon after Comintern had switched its popular in favour of forming a popular front with socialist parties and western intellectuals, against the threat from Nazi Germany. The congress has been described as "a high point of a comparatively interlude in the Stalin years." It took place before the Great Purge in the Soviet Union, and after the start of the Nazi book burnings in Germany.

== Venue and procedure ==
The Congress began with an open air event on 8 August 1934, held by moonlight in the Moscow Park of Culture and Rest, attended by a crowd numbering tens of thousands, and continued for fifteen days in Moscow's Hall of Columns, which was decorated for the occasion by huge portraits of Shakespeare, Balzac, Cervantes, Tolstoy, Gogol, Pushkin and others. There were nearly 600 delegates, plus visiting parties of teachers, actors, factory workers, farm workers, and soldiers.

At the start, delegates were required to elect a Praesidium, a Secretariat, a Credentials Committee and an Editing Committee to manage the congress. In each case, the poet Nikolai Tikhonov moved the motions that created the bodies, and the number and the names of who should be members of each. All his proposals were accepted without dissent. The Praesidium had 52 members, the secretariat had 15.

== Speakers ==
There were about 200 speeches delivered during the congress, the verbatim record of which filled 700 printed pages. The main speakers were Andrei Zhdanov, who delivered the address on behalf of the Central Committee, Maxim Gorky, who gave the report on literature, Nikolai Bukharin, who reported on poetry, Karl Radek, on world literature, and Aleksei Stetsky, who summed up on behalf of the Central Committee.

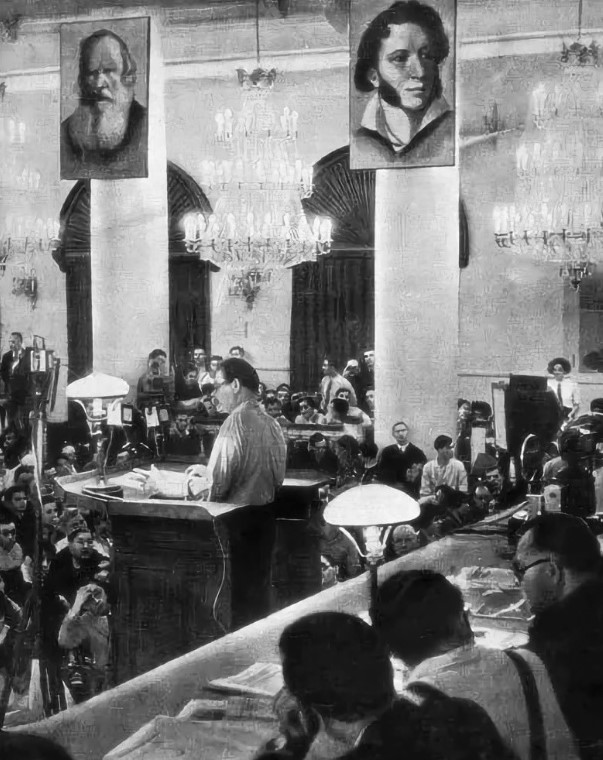
Maxim Gorky's report at the Congress

Most of the writers then living in the Soviet Union whose reputations have outlived the Stalin era, such as Anna Akhmatova, Mikhail Bulgakov and Andrei Platonov were not delegates to the Congress. The poets Osip Mandelstam and Nikolai Klyuev were under arrest. But Boris Pasternak was a visible presence, on the congress platform, and was singled out for praise by Bukharin, but attacked by the next speaker, Alexey Surkov. The writers Isaac Babel and Yuri Olesha spoke from the floor. The oldest speaker was Gustave Isnard, an 86-year survivor of the Paris Commune of 1871.

According to Ilya Ehrenburg:

All the delegations 'presented claims': the women textile-workers wanted a novel about weavers, the railwaymen said that writers neglected transport problems, the miners asked for a description of the Donbas, inventors insisted on inventor-heroes ... The old ashug (poet-singer) Suleyman Stalsky instead of making a speech decided to recite, or rather sing a poem about the Congress.

The main business of the Congress, conducted at the end, was to agree to create the Union of Soviet Writers, and the composition of its governing bodies.

== Aftermath ==
Out of nearly 600 delegates to the Congress, just 123 were still alive at the time of the second writers' congress in 1954. Some, including Gorky and Zhdanov, died of natural causes, or were killed during the war with Germany, but a very large proportion are likely to have been victims of the Great Purge, during which Bukharin, Stetsky and Babel were executed, and Radek was sent to the Gulag, where he was murdered.
