= Pavel Lobanov =

Soviet bureaucrat and academician (1902–1984)

- Павел Лобанов
- Lobanov in 1959

Deputy Chairman of the Council of Ministers of the Soviet Union
- In office February 28, 1955 – April 9, 1956
- Prime Minister: Nikolai Bulganin

5th People's Commissar of Grain and Livestock Farms of the Soviet Union
- In office December 10, 1938 – March 15, 1946
- Prime Minister: Vyacheslav Molotov; Joseph Stalin
- Preceded by: Tikhon Yurkin
- Succeeded by: Position abolished

6th Chairman of the Council of the Union of the Supreme Soviet of the Soviet Union
- In office July 14, 1956 – March 18, 1962
- Preceded by: Alexander Volkov
- Succeeded by: Ivan Spiridonov

First Deputy Chairman of the Council of Ministers of the Russian Soviet Federative Socialist Republic
- In office 1953–1955
- Prime Minister: Alexander Puzanov

1st Minister of Agriculture of the Russian Soviet Federative Socialist Republic
- In office December 20, 1953 – March 26, 1955
- Prime Minister: Alexander Puzanov
- Preceded by: Himself as Minister of Agriculture and Procurement of the Russian Soviet Federative Socialist Republic
- Succeeded by: Peter Morozov

2nd Minister of Agriculture and Procurement of the Russian Soviet Federative Socialist Republic
- In office August 15, 1953 – December 20, 1953
- Prime Minister: Alexander Puzanov
- Preceded by: Alexander Fedin
- Succeeded by: Position abolished

9th People's Commissar of Agriculture of the Russian Soviet Federative Socialist Republic
- In office 1938 – December 1938
- Preceded by: Nikolay Lisitsyn
- Succeeded by: Alexey Sukhov

Personal details
- Born: January 15, 1902 Staro, Russian Empire
- Died: August 13, 1984 (aged 82) Moscow, Russian SFSR, Soviet Union
- Party: Communist Party of the Soviet Union (from 1927)
- Education: Kliment Timiryazev Moscow Agricultural Academy (1925)
- Portfolio: Doctor of Economics, Academician of the Lenin All–Union Academy of Agricultural Sciences (1948)
- Awards: Hero of Socialist Labour; Order of Lenin; Order of the October Revolution; Order of the Red Banner of Labour; Order of Friendship of Peoples; Medal "For Labour Valour"

Pavel Pavlovich Lobanov (Russian: Павел Павлович Лобанов; January 15, 1902 – August 13, 1984) was a Soviet bureaucrat and academician. He was a member of the Central Auditing Commission of the Communist Party of the Soviet Union from 1939 to 1952 and a candidate member of the CPSU from 1956 to 1961.

== Biography ==
Lobanov was born into a peasant family in Moscow Governorate. He graduated from the Agronomic Faculty of the Moscow Timiryazev Agricultural Academy in 1925.

- 1925 – agronomist of the Shakhovskaya Section of the Volokolamsky Uyezd of the Moscow Region;
- 1925–1926 – served in the Workers' and Peasants' Red Army;
- 1926–1927 – agronomist for grain inspection of the elevator of the Moscow–Kazan railway;
- 1927–1930 – agronomist of the Kostroma District and district land administration;
- 1930–1931 – technical director of the Soviet Farm "Ilyich's Precepts", Ivanovo Oblast;
- 1931–1936 – postgraduate student at the All–Union Scientific Research Institute of Soviet Farms;
- 1936–1937 – head of the department of the Moscow Institute of Land Management;
- 1937 – Director of the Voronezh Agricultural Institute;
- 1937–1938 – Deputy People's Commissar of Agriculture of the Russian Soviet Federative Socialist Republic;
- 1938 – People's Commissar of Agriculture of the Russian Soviet Federative Socialist Republic;
- 1938–1946 – People's Commissar of Grain and Livestock Farms of the Soviet Union;
- 1946–1953 – Deputy, 1st Deputy Minister of Agriculture of the Soviet Union;
- 1953 – 1st Deputy Minister of Agriculture and Procurement of the Soviet Union;
- 1953–1955 – First Deputy Chairman of the Council of Ministers of the Russian Soviet Federative Socialist Republic and Minister of Agriculture and Procurement of the Russian Soviet Federative Socialist Republic (since 1953 – Minister of Agriculture of the Russian Soviet Federative Socialist Republic);
- 1955–1956 – Deputy Chairman of the Council of Ministers of the Soviet Union;
- 1956–1961 – President of the Lenin All–Union Academy of Agricultural Sciences and Chairman of the Council of the Union of the Supreme Soviet of the Soviet Union (until 1962);
- 1961–1965 – Deputy Chairman of the State Planning Committee of the Soviet Union;
- 1965–1978 – President of the Lenin All–Union Academy of Agricultural Sciences.

From 1978, he was a personal pensioner.

He died in 1984 and is buried in the city of Dmitrov.

== Awards ==
- Hero of Socialist Labour;
- Two Orders of Lenin;
- Order of the October Revolution;
- Order of the Red Banner of Labour;
- Order of Friendship of Peoples.

== Sources ==
- Лобанов Павел Павлович (Lobanov Pavel Pavlovich) in the Great Soviet Encyclopedia (in Russian) – via Great Scientific Library
- State Power of the Soviet Union. The Highest Authorities And Management And Their Leaders. 1923–1991. Historical and Biographical Reference Book / Compiled by Vladimir Ivkin. Moscow, 1999 – ISBN 5-8243-0014-3

Preceded by Trofim Lysenko	President of the Lenin All–Union Academy of Agricultural Sciences; April 10, 1956 – August 8, 1961	Succeeded by Trofim Lysenko
Preceded by Mikhail Olshansky	President of the Lenin All–Union Academy of Agricultural Sciences; February 10, 1965 – August 1, 1978	Succeeded by Pyotr Vavilov
