= Ivan Lychev =

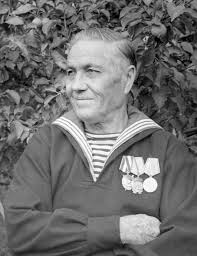
Ivan Lychev

Ivan Akimovich Lychev (Russian: Иван Акимович Лычёв; 11 June 1881 – 16 November 1972) was a Soviet politician. He was a member of the Central Control Commission and the Committee of Party Control. He also served as Administrator of Affairs (1935–1938) of the Central Committee of the All-Union Communist Party (Bolsheviks).

Preceded by Timofey Samsonov	Chief Administrator; 1935–1938	Succeeded by Dmitry Krupin

== Bibliography ==
- Воспоминания потёмкинца. М.,Л., 1925.
- Мятеж на «Потёмкине». Самара, 1925.
- Потёмкинцы. Хабаровск, 1935.
- Потёмкинцы. Минск, 1936.
- Потёмкинцы. Восспоминания участника восстания на броненосце «Князь *Потёмкин-Таврический». М., 1937.
- Потёмкинцы. Воспоминания о восстании на броненосце «Князь Потёмкин-*Таврический». М., 1954.
- Подготовка и восстание на броненосце «Потёмкин» // Военные моряки в *период первой русской революции 1905—1907 гг. М. 1955.
- Годы борьбы. Записки старого большевика. Куйбышев. 1957.
- Потёмкинцы. М., 1965.
