= Joseph Meerzon =

Bundist and later Soviet politician

Joseph Isaakovich Meerzon (Russian: Жозеф Исаакович Меерзон; October 31, 1894 – February 10, 1938) was a Bundist and later Soviet politician. He was educated at Moscow State University. He joined the Communist Party of the Soviet Union in 1918 and started as Secretary of the District Committee. From August 1919 to September 1920 he was Chairman of the Vitebsk gubernatorial Committee. He was Secretary of the responsible Tula gubernatorial Committee from December 1920 to May 1923. During the Great Purge, he was arrested on October 10, 1937, sentenced to death by the Military Collegium of the Supreme Court of the USSR on February 8, 1938, and executed by firing squad two days later. After the death of Joseph Stalin, he was posthumously rehabilitated in 1955.

Preceded by Dmitri Bulatov	Head of the Organizational-Instruction Department of the Central Committee; 1931–1932	Succeeded by Pavel Postyshev

== Bibliography ==
- Przewodnik po historii Partii Komunistycznej i ZSRR (ros.)
- http://www.sakharov-center.ru/asfcd/martirolog/?t=page&id=10988 (ros.)
