= Timofey Samsonov =

Timofey Petrovich Samsonov (Russian: Тимофей Петрович Самсонов; 9 May 1888 – 28 October 1955) was a Russian revolutionary, Soviet politician and veteran of the Russian Civil War.

He became a member of the Bolshevik faction of the Russian Social Democratic Labour Party in 1906 but left the Party to join an Anarcho-Syndicalist group. He later rejoined the Russian Communist Party (b) in 1918 and served in the Civil War.

He was a member of the Central Committee elected by the 15th Congress of the All-Union Communist Party (Bolsheviks), the Central Committee elected by the 16th Congress of the All-Union Communist Party (Bolsheviks) and the Central Committee elected by the 17th Congress of the All-Union Communist Party (Bolsheviks). He was Chief Administrator (1927–1935) and head of the Accounting Department (1932–1934) of the Central Committee. He retired in 1955 and died two months later in Moscow.

== Bibliography ==
- Самсонов Т. П. Вне закона. М., 1933.
- Незавершённая историческая повесть о Д. Кантемире;
- Автор многочисленных публикаций в печати — статей, воспоминаний.

== Works ==
- Алексеев М. А., Колпакиди А. И., Кочик В. Я. Энциклопедия военной разведки. 1918—1945 гг. М., 2012, с. 687;
- Архив ВЧК / Отв. Ред. В. Виноградов, А. Литвин, В. Христофоров. М.: Кучково поле, 2007. С. 702–703;
- Кучков Г., Плеханов А. Чекисты: история в лицах. Москва, Кучково Поле, 2008, с. 110;
- Демоническое. История уголовно-политического террора в биографиях. Под редакцией Гусева О., Перина Р., 2003 г
