= Tikhon Yurkin =

Soviet bureaucrat (1898–1986)

- Тихон Юркин
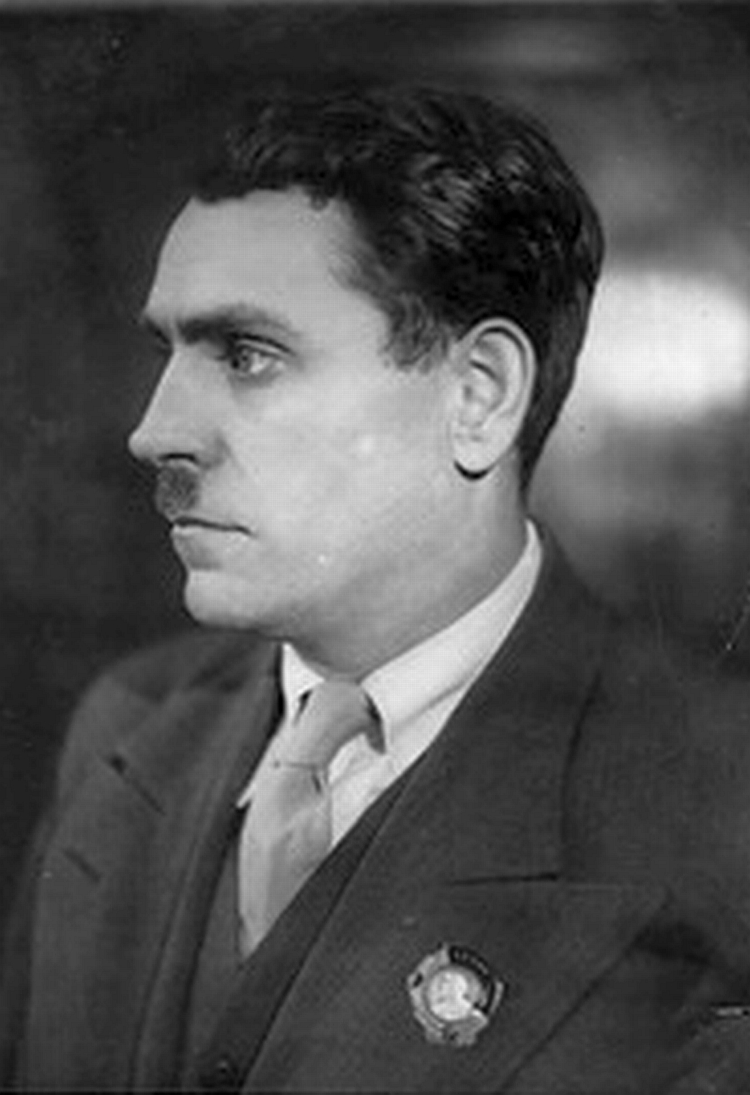
- Yurkin in 1930

Minister of Procurement of the Russian Soviet Federative Socialist Republic
- In office 6 March 1961 – 1962

Minister of Grain Products of the Russian Soviet Federative Socialist Republic
- In office 5 September 1960 – 6 March 1961
- Preceded by: Fyodor Kulakov
- Succeeded by: Position abolished

Minister of Soviet Farms of the Russian Soviet Federative Socialist Republic
- In office 1954–1957
- Preceded by: Position established
- Succeeded by: Position abolished

4th People's Commissar of Grain and Livestock Soviet Farms of the Soviet Union
- In office 22 July 1937 – 21 November 1938
- Preceded by: Nikolay Demchenko
- Succeeded by: Pavel Lobanov

People's Commissar of Grain and Livestock Soviet Farms of the Russian Soviet Federative Socialist Republic
- In office September 1936 – August 1937
- Preceded by: Position established
- Succeeded by: Ivan Benediktov

1st People's Commissar of Grain and Livestock Soviet Farms of the Soviet Union
- In office 1 October 1932 – 4 April 1934
- Preceded by: Position established
- Succeeded by: Moisey Kalmanovich

Personal details
- Born: 29 June 1898 Moscow, Russian Empire
- Died: August 18 or August 19, 1986 Moscow, Russian SFSR, Soviet Union
- Resting place: Kuntsevo Cemetery, Moscow
- Party: Russian Communist Party (Bolsheviks) (since 1919)
- Awards: Order of Lenin; Order of the October Revolution; Order of Friendship of Peoples; Medal "For Labour Valour"

Tikhon Alexandrovich Yurkin (Russian: Ти́хон Алекса́ндрович Ю́ркин; 29 June 1898 – 18 August 1986) was a Soviet bureaucrat.

== Biography ==
Yurkin was born on 29 June 1898 in the family of a water carrier. He was of Russian ethnicity. Yurkin became a member of the Russian Communist Party from 1919. From 1911 he was a turner at the factories of Moscow and Petrograd; he then served in food detachments in Valuyki and Samara. Starting in 1922, he worked in various Soviet farms in towns such as Kropotkin and Armavir.

In 1928–1930, he was the organizer and first director of the Soviet grain farm Gigant. He then became the chairman of the Board of the All–Union Union of Agricultural Collectives of the Soviet Union in 1930. In the same year, he became a candidate member of the Central Committee of the Communist Party of the Soviet Union.

In 1931 Yurkin became Chairman of the State Association of Union Trusts of Grain Farms. From then until 1937, he moved between various People's Commissar of Grain and Livestock Farms jobs.

In the autumn of 1938, he was accused by Lavrentiy Beria of spying for the United States. Stalin did not agree with the accusations, but on 21 November 1938, Yurkin was removed from the post of People's Commissar "as having failed to do his job" and in the same year was removed from the Central Committee of the Communist Party of the Soviet Union.

In 1939–1943, he was the director of the Soviet farm "May 1" in Balashikha. During the war, he met and began to live in a civil marriage with Lyudmila Ponomareva. He received a secondary education from the Kupyansk Agricultural College in 1948 as an external student.

Between 1949 and 1969, Yurkin bounced between different ministries within the Russian Soviet Federative Socialist Republic; these included Minister of Soviet Farms and Minister of Procurement. In 1962, he became an adviser to the Council of Ministers of the Russian Soviet Federative Socialist Republic, and was later promoted to Deputy of the Supreme Soviet of the Soviet Union from the Novosibirsk Region.

Yurkin died on 18 or 19 August 1986, and was buried at the Kuntsevo Cemetery.

== Personal life ==
Yurkin fathered four children - Yuri Yurkin, Olga Sumarokova, Evgenia Semyonova, and Eleonora Yurkina. He had four grandchildren, including Alexey Semyonov. He was also the great-uncle of the deputy of the State Duma of the Russian Federation, Ilya Ponomarev.

== Awards ==
He was awarded four Orders of Lenin, the Order of the October Revolution, and the Order of Friendship of Peoples.
