= Anton Bulin =

Soviet military personnel (1894–1938)

Anton Stepanovich Bulin
- Born: 10 January 1894
- Died: 29 July 1938 (aged 40)
- Allegiance: Soviet Union
- Branch: Soviet Red Army
- Service years: 1918–1921, 1923–1937
- Rank: Army Commissar 2nd rank
- Conflicts: Russian Civil War; Kinship Wars; Polish–Soviet War; Battle of Warsaw
- Awards: Order of the Red Banner

Anton Stepanovich Bulin (Russian: Антон Степанович Булин; 10 January 1894 – 29 July 1938) was a Russian revolutionary, Soviet political officer and military commander. A member of the Bolshevik Party since 1914, he participated in the Civil War against the White movement and in the wars against Finland and Poland.

He was executed in 1938 during the Great Purge and rehabilitated in 1955.

== Early years ==
Bulin was born in the Yefremovsky Uyezd of the Tula Governorate in a family of Russian ethnicity. He graduated from the village school in 1906 and began working as a teenager.

An active participant in the revolutionary movement in Russia, he joined the Russian Social Democratic Labour Party (RSDLP) at the age of twenty in 1914. From September 1911, he was a clerk in the Kulotinskaya Manufactory Joint Stock Company. In June-August 1914, he was a clerk at the Putilov hospital fund.

In August-September 1914 he was imprisoned. He was expelled from the capital for organizing a strike of office workers in Petrograd.

From September 1914, he was a clerk at the Ressora Joint Stock Company. From May through September 1915, he was a clerk at the Simonovskaya sick fund in Moscow and the sick fund at the Elektroperedachi power plant in Pavlovsky Posad. He left the power plant because the police took him under surveillance.

He continued his revolutionary activities when he was drafted into the Imperial Russian Army. In September-October 1915, he was a private in a reserve infantry regiment in Kazan.

In October-December 1915, he was a storekeeper at the Cheremukhino mine in the city of Apeksandrovsk-Grushevsky, Cherkasy District, Don Cossack Host Region. In December 1915, he illegally returned to Petrograd and worked as a clerk at the Talant society and as an accountant at the wholesale purchasing society in Petrograd. In April-May 1917, he was an assistant to the head of the office of the editorial office of Pravda newspaper in Petrograd. In May-July 1917, he was once again a soldier, this time in the 3rd Reserve Infantry Regiment in Peterhof.

== Revolutionary activity ==
After the February Revolution he was elected a member of the regimental committee of his regiment. During the July Days, he organized a march of his regiment to the Tauride Palace in support of the Petrograd workers, and the 3rd Reserve Infantry Regiment, armed and in full combat order, moved to Petrograd. Bulin walked with a red armband at the head of the regiment. On the way to the Tauride, the soldiers of the 3rd Reserve led the Jaeger, Izmailovsky and Semenovsky regiments along with them.

When the workers and soldiers approached the Tauride Palace, demanding an immediate end to the war and the transfer of all power to the Soviets, rifle shots were heard from the direction of the palace. Bulin and a group of soldiers, without thinking, rushed to the left wing, where the cadets were holed up, and a few minutes later the shots stopped. For this he was arrested in July 1917 and imprisoned in Kresty Prison until September.

The members of the regimental committees arrested after the suppression of the July demonstration, including Bulin, sent a greeting from prison to the 6th Party Congress. This greeting was read at the congress by Yakov Sverdlov. Immediately after his release from prison, Bulin was again among the soldiers.

From September 1917 he was a member of the Red Guard. As a soldier, he participated in the formation of an armed detachment, then, together with this detachment, defended the approaches to Krasnoye Selo. As a commissar of the Peterhof garrison, he participated in battles with the troops of the Russian Provisional Government near Tsarskoye Selo and Krasnoye Selo.

== Record in the Russian Civil War ==
Bulin was chosen as the chairman of the Red Guard headquarters and district military commissar of the 3rd infantry regiment and military commissariats in Peterhof and Luga. In August 1918, he led the suppression of the kulak uprising in Luga.

From November 1918 he was military commissar of the 2nd and 1st rifle brigades of the 6th rifle division, military commissar of the Petrograd separate division on the Narva front, then district military commissar in Tsarskoye Selo and military commissar of a rifle regiment, rifle brigade. In August through December 1919 he was the military commissar of the 6th rifle division of the Northern Front, during the difficult days of fighting with Nikolai Yudenich's troops and the Finnish interventionists. Taking 30 communists with him and armed with two light machine guns, Bulin moved at night across the thin ice of the Luga River, attacked the White Guard general's troops from the rear, and cut off the enemy's escape routes.

Bulin served in 1920 and 1921 as military commissar of a number of other rifle divisions, then commandant of the Petrograd fortified region, before being transferred to party work in July 1921.

== Soviet career ==
From July 1921, Bulin was head of the management department of the Petrograd Soviet, then put in charge of the Vasileostrovsky District, then the Kronstadt regional committees of the RCP(b) in Petrograd and Kronstadt several months after the suppression of the Kronstadt rebellion. In March 1923 he returned to political work in the Red Army as military commissar of the headquarters of the Western Front, then deputy head of the political department of the Western Front. After the disbanding of the front in July 1924, he was assistant to the commander for political affairs and head of the political department of the Moscow Military District.

At the same time, he was engaged in party work in Moscow. For a number of years he was a member of the Bureau of the Moscow City Committee. From 31 December 1925 to 26 June 1930 he was member of the Central Control Commission of the Communist Party of the Soviet Union (elected at the 14th Congress of the All-Union Communist Party (Bolsheviks) and again at the 15th Congress of the All-Union Communist Party (Bolsheviks). From July 1928 he was deputy head of the Main Political Directorate of the Soviet Army and Soviet Navy under first Andrei Bubnov, then Yan Gamarnik.

Bulin had been a long-time opponent of Leon Trotsky, dating from 1919, when Bulin criticized Trotsky's leadership of the army. According to the statement of his wife, Natalia Loginovna Yakovleva-Bulina, sent from the Segezha Corrective Labor Camp (Karelian ASSR) in January 1940 to Voroshilov, "Bulin hated Trotsky with a wild hatred. All people who were active Trotskyists always aroused terrible indignation in Bulin.... In 1927, when Trotsky was expelled from the party, he called Bulin a Stalinist gendarme for dispersing the Trotskyists on 7/11/1927, when they went out into the streets with anti-Stalinist slogans." Bulin was also one of the leaders of the "intra-army opposition", which spoke out against the "insufficient activity of the party and political organs of the army, against the facts of distortion of the party line in the content of military-political education, etc."

== The Great Purge ==
Bulin was personally known and highly valued by Joseph Stalin and Kliment Voroshilov, who recommended him at the 17th Party Congress for membership in the Central Committee. Bulin was a candidate member of the Central Committee elected by the 17th Congress of the All-Union Communist Party (Bolsheviks) from 1934 until 12 October 1937.

Bulin's party career reached its peak during Stalin's campaign of repression against the leadership of the Red Army. In April 1937 he was appointed head of the Directorate for the Commanding Staff of the Red Army, replacing the dismissed and then arrested corps commander Boris Feldman. In July after Pyotr Smirnov replaced Yan Gamarnik as Chief of the Political Directorate of the Red Army Bulin became Smirnov's deputy.

By the end of 1937, however, everything changed. On 5 November 1937, he was arrested by the NKVD on an order signed by Mikhail Frinovsky and expelled from the All-Union Communist Party (Bolsheviks). On 8 December 1937 he was removed from the Central Committee.

Bulin's resistance under interrogation by the NKVD lasted ten days. On 16 November he wrote a statement addressed to Nikolai Yezhov, in which he indicated that in 1929, being the head of the political department of the Moscow Military District and a member of the bureau of the Moscow Committee of the All-Union Communist Party (Bolsheviks), he was recruited into the right-wing organization by the secretary of the Moscow City Committee Nikolai Uglanov. He named Gamarnik as another of his recruiters, but this time into the military conspiracy (in 1934).

Two days later, he found the strength to address the same Yezhov with a new statement, repudiating his confession: "... The statement I submitted to you on 16 November about my participation in a right-wing organization and in a military-fascist conspiracy is false from beginning to end; it was written under the dictation of those conducting the investigation into my case in my ill condition and as a result of beatings and torture; I have never been recruited by anyone into any conspiracy against Soviet power, against the Stalinist leadership of the All-Union Communist Party (Bolsheviks) and I have never been recruited. I have not carried out criminal activity against the party and Soviet power - this statement is truthful and honest. I was surrounded by enemies, I worked, unfortunately, in this environment, I missed their criminal enemy work, but I myself was never their accomplice, I was not an enemy of the people, I was not a conspirator against Soviet power, against the party."

The use of torture against Bulin is also confirmed by the testimony of his former investigator. In his explanation regarding the conduct of the investigation into Bulin's case, he indicated that Yezhov, in the presence of the investigative team, personally beat up Bulin for his refusal to admit his affiliation with the agents of the tsarist secret police.

The Politburo of the Central Committee of the All-Union Communist Party (Bolsheviks) nonetheless included him on the list of prisoners to be executed on 26 July 1938. He was formally sentenced to death by the Military Collegium of the Supreme Court of the USSR on 28 July 1938 "for participation in a counter-revolutionary Trotskyist organization" under Articles 58-16, 58-8, 58-9 and 58-11 of the Criminal Code of the RSFSR. He was shot on the following day.

He was rehabilitated by the Decision of the Military Collegium of 8 October 1955.

== Honors ==
He was a recipient of the Order of the Red Banner for his courage and leadership under fire in November 1919. “The military commissar of the 6th rifle division, comrade Anton Stepanovich Bulin, is awarded the Order of the Red Banner for the following distinctions: during the entire operation from Ligovo to 28 November 1919, Bulin, often being with chains in position, showed rare persistence and energy and with his behavior instilled an offensive spirit in the Red Army soldiers, achieved that in difficult times our units, overcoming fatigue and resistance of the enemy, moved forward ... In the battle near the village of Vysotskoye during the retreat of the Bashkirs on the night of 1-2 November, comrade Bulin restrained and inspired them; “There was not a single part of the Krasnoselsky district that he had not visited, everywhere demonstrating composure and resourcefulness, often being under rifle, machine gun and artillery fire...”

== Family ==
Father - Stepan Zinovievich Bulin (born in 1857).

Mother - Matrona Yakovlevna Bulina.

Wife - Natalia Loginovna Yakovleva-Bulina (born in 1897) was sentenced as a member of the family of a traitor to the Motherland to eight years in a labor camp, released from the Karaganda camp in 1945, teacher.

Eldest son - Sergei Antonovich Bulin. Born in 1919 in Petrograd. Arrested on 23 November 1937; at the time of his arrest, he was a 10th grade student. He was sentenced on 19 August 1938 by a special meeting of the NKVD of the USSR to five years in the camps. He served his term in the Berezniki camp in the Arkhangelsk region. He died in custody on 25 December 1941 and was rehabilitated on 8 February 1956.

Youngest son - Vladimir Antonovich Bulin. Born in 1920 in Petrograd. Arrested on 23 November 1937; at the time of his arrest, he was a 9th-grade student. He was sentenced on 19 August 1938 by a special meeting of the NKVD of the USSR to three years in the camps. He served his term in the Eastern Railway Camp (Komsomolsk-on-Amur) and was rehabilitated on 29 August 1956.
