= Konstantin Ukhanov =

- Константин Уханов
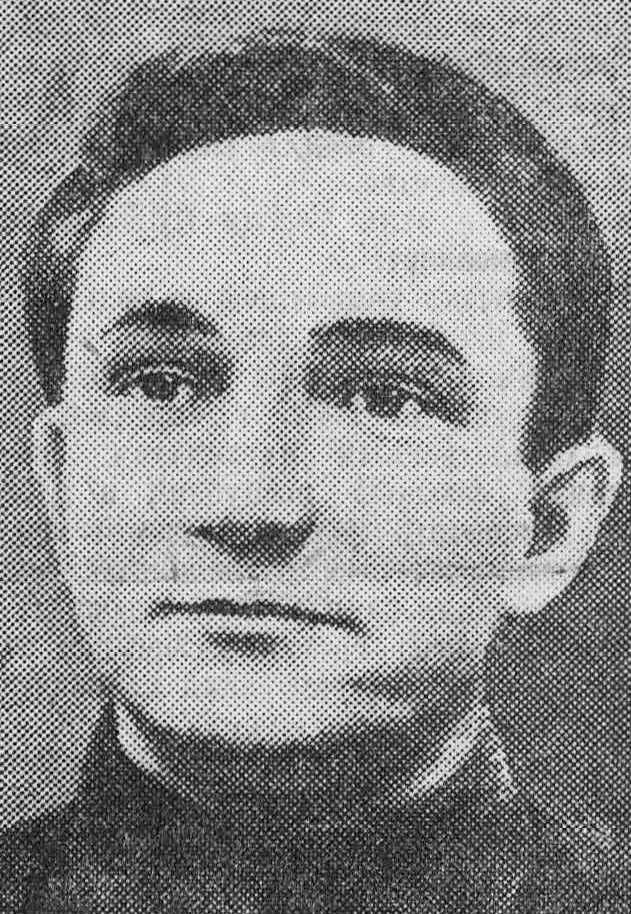
- Ukhanov in 1935

People's Commissar of Light Industry of the RSFSR
- In office 1936–1937
- Preceded by: Position established
- Succeeded by: Sergei Lukin

People's Commissar of Local Industry of the RSFSR
- In office 1934–1936
- Preceded by: Position established
- Succeeded by: Ivan Zhukov

Chairman of the Moscow Council of Workers' Deputies
- In office 1926–1932
- Preceded by: Lev Kamenev
- Succeeded by: Grigory Kaminsky

Personal details
- Born: 1891 Kazan, Russian Empire
- Died: 26 October 1937 (aged 45–46)
- Party: CPSU
- Awards: Order of Lenin

Konstantin Vasilievich Ukhanov (Russian: Константин Васильевич Уханов; 1891, Kazan – 26 October 1937, Moscow) was a Soviet politician and statesman.

== Biography ==
Ukhanov was born into the family of a poor fisherman. He became a worker in 1906 and joined the Bolsheviks in February 1907. He was involved in party activities in the Ivanovo-Voznesensk, Voronezh, Kostroma, St. Petersburg, Nizhny Novgorod province. From 1915 he was in Moscow and worked at the Dynamo plant. He was arrested and exiled for his revolutionary activity. After the February Revolution of 1917, he became a deputy of the Moscow City Council, was a member of its Presidium, then chairman of the Simonovsky District Council of Moscow. In the early days of October Revolution, he became a member of the Moscow Military Revolutionary Committee.

During the Civil War he was Chairman of the Rogozhsko-Simonovsky District Council of Moscow and a member of the Presidium of the Moscow City Council. Then he worked at the Dynamo plant first as a locksmith, then as a “red director”. As a capable organizer of production, he was nominated to the post of chairman of the board of the State Electrotechnical Trust. At the 12th Party Congress he was elected a member of the Central Committee of the Russian Communist Party (b).

From 17 May 1926 to 23 September 1929 Ukhanov was Chairman of the Executive Committee of the Moscow Council of Workers, Peasants and Red Army Deputies and from 23 September 1929 to 28 February 1931 Chairman of the Executive Committee of the Moscow Regional Council of Workers 'and Peasants' Deputies.

He was in charge of the economy of the capital in the final period of the NEP and at the beginning of the industrialization of the country. Under his leadership, a large-scale reconstruction of the capital's industry was launched, including such factories as Dynamo, an automobile plant, Hammer and Sickle, named after Vladimir Ilyich. New industrial giants were created such as Electrozavod, Fraser, GPZ-1 and others.

Along with the real achievements during the years of Ukhanov's leadership, the massive destruction of historical monuments began. In 1927, the Red Gate was dismantled. Closing of churches and their re-equipment for economic needs took place, there was a liquidation of private cooperative enterprises.

He was repeatedly elected a member of the All-Russian Central Executive Committee and the Central Executive Committee of the USSR and was a member of their Presidium. From 1923 to 1937 he was a member of the Central Committee of the All-Union Communist Party (b). Candidate member of the Central Committee Organizing Bureau from 1926 to 1930.

From 1932, Ukhanov worked as Deputy People's Commissar for Supply of the USSR. From 1934 he was appointed People's Commissar of Local Industry of the RSFSR.

He was awarded the Order of Lenin for overfulfilment of the production plan of 1935 by the People's Commissariat of Local Industry of the RSFSR and the successes achieved in organizing production and mastering technology.

On 21 May 1937 he was arrested by the NKVD. On 22 May 1937 he was removed from the Central Committee of the VKP (b) by a poll. Convicted by the Military Collegium of the Supreme Court of the USSR on 26 October 1937 to be executed, shot on the same day. He was buried in the Donskoye Cemetery in Moscow.

Ukhanov was rehabilitated on 27 August 1955, and posthumously reinstated in the party on 4 October 1955.
