= Nikolai Demchenko =

Soviet politician (1896–1937)

Nikolai Nesterovich Demchenko
- Микола Нестерович Демченко
- Born: 21 May 1896; Lebedyn, Lebedinsky Uyezd, Kharkov Governorate, Russian Empire
- Died: 30 October 1937 (aged 41); Moscow, Soviet Union
- Education: Kharkiv University
- Occupations: Politician, communist

Nikolai Nesterovich Demchenko (Ukrainian: Мико́ла Не́стерович Де́мченко, Russian: Никола́й Не́стерович Де́мченко; 21 May 1896 – 30 October 1937) was a Ukrainian communist and Soviet politician. Executed during the Great Purge, he was rehabilitated during the Khrushchev Thaw.

== Early years ==
He was born in Lebedyn, Kharkov Governorate, now the Sumy Oblast, Ukraine, to a bourgeois family. In 1915, he graduated from the gymnasium in Lebedyn. He studied medicine at Kharkiv University, graduating in March 1917.

== Soviet career ==
Demchenko had already become a member of the Bolshevik Party in 1916. He held a number of different positions in the following years, becoming a candidate member of the Central Committee of the CP(b)U in May 1924, a member of the Central Control Commission of the CP(b)U in December 1925, a member of the Central Committee of the CP(b)U in November 1927, a member of the Organizational Bureau of the Central Committee of the CP(b)U in November 1927, a candidate member of the Politburo in June 1928, a member of the Politburo of the Central Committee of the CP(b)U in March 1931, and a candidate member of the Central Committee of the CPSU(b) in February 1934. He was the People's Commissar of Agriculture of the Ukrainian SSR from December 1929 to January 1932, playing an active part in collectivization. He received the Order of Lenin on 20 December 1935.

== Arrest, execution and rehabilitation ==
During the Great Purge, he was arrested on 22 July 1937, sentenced to death by the Military Collegium of the Supreme Court of the USSR on 29 October 1937 and executed by firing squad the next day. After the death of Joseph Stalin, he was rehabilitated.

Preceded by New office	First Secretary of the Kiev Regional Committee; 1932–1934	Succeeded by Pavel Postyshev
