= Aleksei Stetskii =

Russian Soviet politician, journalist, official and propagandist

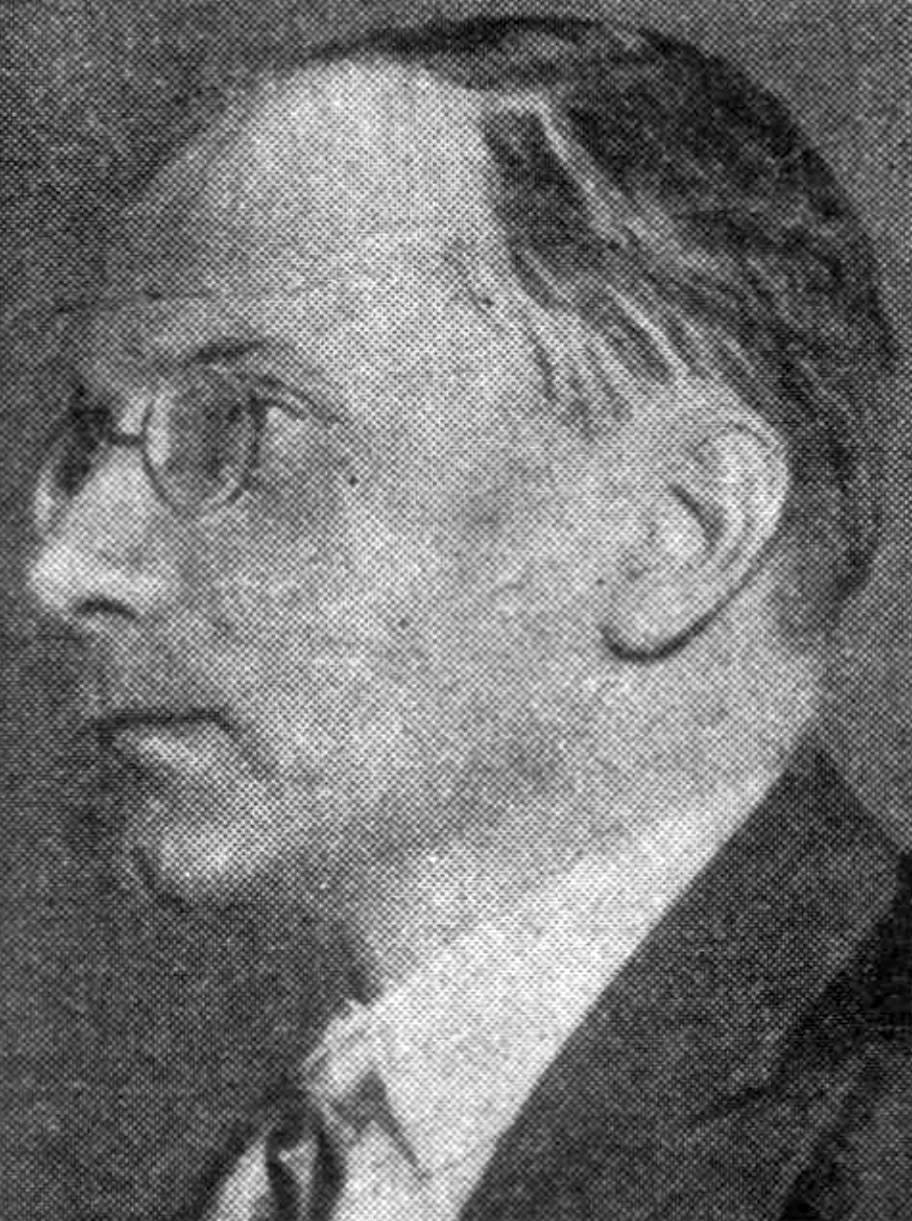
Aleksei Stetski in 1938

Aleksei Ivanovich Stetskii (Russian: Алексе́й Ива́нович Сте́цкий; January 15, 1896 – August 1, 1938) was a Russian Soviet politician, journalist and official and propagandist of the All-Union Communist Party (Bolsheviks).

== Biography ==
Stesky was born in a village in the Vyazemsky district of Smolensk province of Russia, where his father was a petty official. He was of Russian ethnicity. The family later moved to Chernihiv province of Ukraine, where as a teenager, he distributed anti-war literature early in the World War I. In 1915 he enrolled at the Petrograd Polytechnic University and joined the Bolshevik Party in the same year. He did not graduate from the university because he was expelled in 1916 for his revolutionary activities, and banned from living in Petrograd, though he returned illegally just before the February Revolution.

During 1917, he was an agitator of the Petersburg Party Committee, then secretary of the factory committee, and member of the Vyborg District Party Committee. Delegate of the VI Congress of the Russian Communist Party (b). Stesky was a participant of the October uprising in Petrograd and the suppression of the Kerensky–Krasnov rebellion. From 1918 to 1920 he worked in military-political and staff of the Red Army.

After the Civil War he studied at the Institute of Red Professors, where he became a member of the group known as 'Bukharin's Professors' – acolytes of the Bolshevik leader, Nikolai Bukharin, whom Stetsky supported in the power struggles on the 1920s, while Bukharin was an ally of Joseph Stalin. In 1924–27, Stetsky was a member of the Central Control Commission, chaired by Sergo Ordzhonikidze, which heard disciplinary cases against supporters of the Left Opposition. In May 1925, when Komsomolskaya Pravda was launched as the official organ of the Communist Youth League, Stetsky was appointed its first chief editor.

In 1926–27, when thousands of members of the Leningrad (St Petersburg) communist party were purged after a public rift between Stalin and the regional party boss, Grigory Zinoviev, Stetsky was sent to the region to assist the new, Stalinist first party secretary, Sergei Kirov as head of the regional agitprop department. In 1927, he was recalled to Moscow and elected to the Central Committee.

In summer 1928, Stalin executed an abrupt change in party policy, sending detachments into villages to force the peasants to hand over grain to be used to finance a rapid expansion of industry. When the Central Committee met in July, Stetsky was one of the main speakers opposing the new policy, along with Bukharin, but found himself in a minority, and was disowned by the delegation from Leningrad, of which he was a member. In October, he approached Kirov and Ordzhonikidze to tell them that he had decided to sever his links with Bukharin and support Stalin. His defection was publicised in Pravda in March 1929. He was the only one "Bukharin's Professors" to change allegiance.

From 1930 to May 1935 he was head of the Central Committee Department of Culture and Propaganda. He was also a member of the organizing committee of the Union of Soviet Writers which was nominally under the chairmanship of Maxim Gorky however Stesky was the de facto leader of the union and in charge of all its affairs. He was a key speaker at the First Congress of Soviet Writers in September 1934, extolling the "free, creative competition" that he claimed to be the mark of Soviet literature.

After the assassination of Kirov in December 1934, Stetsky sent a memo to party leaders, dated 23 January 1935, telling them that a painting created to mark the event by an artist named Nikolai Mikhailov (1898–1940) was 'counter-revolutionary' because it included an image of a skeleton whose "feet, limbs and so forth are given in different colours and patches", while the "shine and colour of the hard part of the skull is emphasised, and could not be a human head." He recommended that Mikhailov should be arrested – which he was. He was either shot, or died of a stroke after years in a labour camp.

In 1935 Stetsky became chief editor of the magazine Kommunist.

Early in the Great Purge, Stetsky was given a personal assurance that Stalin had confidence in him despite his past association with Bukharin, but he was arrested on 26 April 1938, a month after Bukharin's execution, and under interrogation was forced to 'confess' that he had been part of a secret anti-soviet organisation headed by Bukharin since 1924. He was sentenced to death on 1 August 1938, and shot the same day.

After the death of Joseph Stalin, by the decision of the Military Collegium of the Supreme Court of the USSR he was posthumously rehabilitated in May 1956.

== Bibliography ==
- Przewodnik po historii Partii Komunistycznej i ZSRR (ros.)
- http://az-libr.ru/index.htm?Persons&0B5/84e77bbb/0001/ceb6f017 (ros.)
- "Стецкий Алексей Иванович" (in Russian). ХРОНОС: ВСЕМИРНАЯ ИСТОРИЯ В ИНТЕРНЕТЕ.
- http://www.sakharov-center.ru/asfcd/martirolog/?t=page&id=17131 (ros.)
