= Ivan Zhukov =

Ivan Pavlovich Zhukov (1889 – 30 October 1937) was a Soviet politician and statesman. He was a member of the Central Committee elected by the 17th Congress of the All-Union Communist Party (Bolsheviks) He received the Order of Lenin in 1931. During the Great Purge, he was arrested on 21 June 1937, sentenced to death on 29 October 1937 and executed by firing squad the following day. After the death of Joseph Stalin, he was rehabilitated in 1956.
