= Isidor Lyubimov =

Soviet revolutionary and politician (1882–1937)

- Исидор Любимов

People's Commissar of Light Industry of the Soviet Union
- In office 5 January 1932 – 7 September 1937
- Prime Minister: Vyacheslav Molotov
- Preceded by: Position established
- Succeeded by: Vasily Shestakov

Chairman of the Tsentrosoyuz
- In office 1926 – November 1930
- Preceded by: Lev Khinchuk
- Succeeded by: Isaak Zelensky

Personal details
- Born: 13 May 1882 Kostroma Governorate, Russian Empire,
- Died: 27 November 1937 (aged 55) Moscow, Russian SFSR, Soviet Union
- Resting place: Donskoye Cemetery
- Party: RSDLP (Bolsheviks) (1902–1918); Russian Communist Party (Bolsheviks) (1918–1937)
- Awards: Order of Lenin

Isidor Yevstigneyevich Lyubimov (Russian: Исидор Евстигнеевич Любимов; 13 May 1882 – 27 November 1937) was a Russian revolutionary and Soviet politician. Lyubimov was Mikhail Frunze's closest associate during the Russian Revolution and Civil War.

== Biography ==
=== Early revolutionary career ===
Lyubimov was born into a peasant family. After graduating from school he worked as a tailor and later as a teacher. Lyubimov joined the Bolshevik faction of the Russian Social Democratic Labour Party in 1902. At the end of 1905 he was removed from teaching by the Zemstvo administration for unreliability. He went underground and devoted himself entirely to party work. From 1906 to 1907 he worked as a professional revolutionary in Ivanovo-Voznesensk and was the responsible leader of the elections to the 2nd and 3rd State Dumas in the Vladimir Province. In 1908 he moved to Moscow and worked as a carpenter.

From October 1908 to November 1909 he was a carpenter in the carpentry workshop of the Museum of Visual Aids in Moscow; worked in the trade union of printers, in the winter of 1908 was elected secretary of the Union of Printers of Moscow, at the same time participated in the party group of trade union workers. At the same time he worked as a member of the board in the public educational club of public entertainment organized by the printers of Moscow.

In December 1909 he was arrested, after five months in Butyrka prison and was sent to Nizhny Novgorod.

From 1910 to 1911 he organized the distribution of social-democratic and professional magazines in the factories of Nizhny Novgorod and Sormov, and worked in the unions of printers and tailors. He participated in local party work and in the organization of the party magazine "Volga Byl". In 1911 he was arrested and imprisoned in the Nizhny Novgorod prison. From 1911 to 1914 he was exiled to the Vologda province. In the city of Vologda organized a workers' cultural and educational club "Enlightenment".

From 1914 he has been the head of the labor department at the Committee for Aid to Refugees in Vologda.

From 1915 to 1917 he served in the Imperial Russian army. He worked in the All-Russian Zemstvo Union on the Western Front, where he also conducted Bolshevik party work, in particular, in Luninets.

=== October Revolution and Civil War ===
In March 1917, together with Mikhail Frunze, he was the organizer of the Council of Soldiers 'and Workers' Deputies in Minsk. He was also one of the organizers of the 1st Front Congress of Soldiers' Deputies of the Western Front, was elected a comrade of the chairman of the executive committee of the Council of Soldiers' Deputies of the Western Front. He was one of the organizers of the Bolshevik faction of the Minsk Soviet and the Minsk Committee of the RSDLP (B). From March, 1917, he was a member of the Provisional Executive Committee of the Minsk Soviet.

From July to August 1917 Lyubimov was Chairman of the Minsk Council of Workers' and Soldiers' Deputies.

In August 1917, at the request of the Ivanovo-Voznesensk District Committee of the RSDLP (B), the Central Committee of the RSDLP (B) sent Frunze and Lyubimov to responsible party work in the cities of Ivanovo-Voznesensk and Shuya. Lyubimov organized and edited the Ivanovo-Voznesensk city newspaper Nasha Zvezda.

From October 1917 he Mayor of Ivanovo-Voznesensk and rom November 22, 1917, Lyubimov was chairman airman of the Ivanovo-Voznesenskaya Council. On November 25, 1917, he was elected a member of the Constituent Assembly of the RSDLP (B) in the Vladimir constituency.

In November 1917, on Lyubimov's initiative, the newspaper Rabochy Horod (Worker's Land) was founded, a body of the Ivanovo-Voznesensk Public Self-Government and the Ivanovo-Voznesensk City Council of Workers' Deputies. Lyubimov took an active part in editing the newspaper.

Lyubimov was sent to Central Asia and from October 1919 to November 1920 he was a member of the Revolutionary Military Council of the Turkestan Front, authorized to supply the Turkestan Front.

At the same time, from 1919 to 1920, he was a member of the presidium of the CEC of the Turkestan Autonomous Soviet Socialist Republic and deputy chairman of the Central Election Commission of the Turkestan Autonomous Soviet Socialist Republic.

In 1920 he became Chairman of the Samarkand Regional Military Revolutionary Committee, Deputy Chairman of the Central Committee of the CP (b) Turkestan. From May to September 1920 he was chairman of the Council of People's Commissars of the Turkestan SFR.

On October 8, 1920, at a congress of representatives of the peoples of Bukhara on behalf of the RSFSR, Lyubimov proclaimed the recognition of the independence of the formed Bukharan People's Soviet Republic.

In 1921 he was commissioned to supply the troops of Ukraine and the Crimea. In 1921 he was a member of the Presidium of the National Economy Council of the Ukrainian SSR, secretary of the Southern Bureau of the All-Ukrainian Central Executive Committee, and a member of the Presidium of the All-Ukrainian Central Executive Committee.

=== Soviet politician ===
From October 1921 he was deputy chairman, and from 1922 to 1924 he was chairman of the Main Directorate for the Restoration and Development of Cotton Growing (Main Cotton Committee) under the Supreme Soviet of the RSFSR (USSR); Chairman of the Central Asian Economic Conference, member and deputy chairman of the Central Asian Bureau of the Central Committee of the Russian Communist Party (b).

From February 1924 to May 1925 he was Second Deputy Chairman of the Moscow City Council and the executive committee of the Moscow Provincial Council; member of the Presidium of the Supreme Soviet of the USSR. From April 1926 to November 1930 he was chairman of the board of the Central Union of Consumer Societies (Central Union). From November 1930 to 1931 he was Deputy People's Commissar for Foreign and Domestic Trade of the USSR and, at the same time, Trade Representative of the USSR in Germany.

On January 5, 1932, the People's Commissariat of Light Industry of the Soviet Union was created and Lyubimov was appointed its People's Commissar.

=== Arrest and execution ===
At the June Plenum of the Central Committee in 1937, Lyubimov was accused of political disloyalty and connections with the exposed "enemies of the people", after which, by a resolution of the plenum of June 25, 1937, a "political no-confidence" was declared against Lyubimov and several other members of the Central Committee.

On September 7, 1937, he was removed from the post of People's Commissar of Light Industry of the USSR without being granted a new position. He was arrested on September 24, 1937, and was accused of participating in an anti-Soviet right-Trotskyist organization. At the October Plenum of the Central Committee was expelled from the Central Committee as an exposed "enemy of the people." His name later appeared on an execution list by the Politburo. On November 27, 1937, the verdict was formally approved by the Military Collegium of the Supreme Court of the Soviet Union and Lyubimov was executed on the same day.

Isidor Lyubimov was posthumously rehabilitated on March 14, 1956, and reinstated in the party on March 22, 1956.
