= Pavel Postyshev =

Soviet politician and party official (1887–1939)

- Павел Постышев
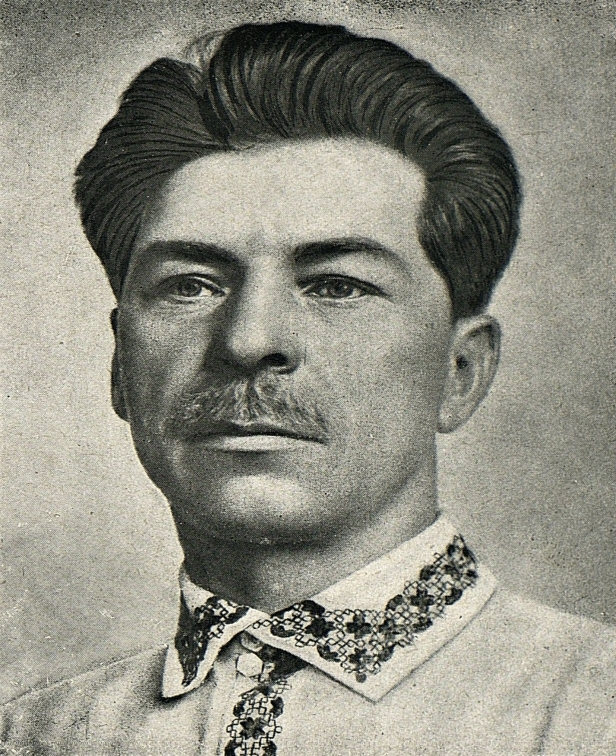
- Postyshev in 1935

First Secretary of the Communist Party of Ukraine
- In office 10 June 1934 – 16 January 1937
- Preceded by: Nikolai Demchenko
- Succeeded by: Sergey Kudryavtsev
- In office 13 November 1924 – November 1926
- Preceded by: Lavrentiy Kartvelishvili
- Succeeded by: Fyodor Kornyushin

Head of the Organizational-Instruction Department of the Central Committee
- In office 1932 – January 1933
- Preceded by: Joseph Meerzon
- Succeeded by: Vladimir Polonsky

Candidate member of the 17th Politburo
- In office 10 February 1934 – 14 January 1938

Full member of the 17th Secretariat
- In office 13 July 1930 – 10 February 1934

Full member of the 16th Orgburo
- In office 13 July 1930 – 10 February 1934

Personal details
- Born: Pavel Petrovich Postyshev; 18 September [O.S. 6 September] 1887 Ivanovo, Russian Empire
- Died: 26 February 1939 (aged 51) Moscow, Russian SFSR, Soviet Union
- Party: RSDLP (Bolsheviks) (1904–1918); Russian Communist Party (1918–1938); Communist Party of Ukraine
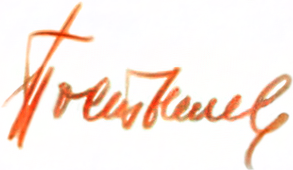
- Signature

Pavel Petrovich Postyshev (Russian: Павел Петрович Постышев; 18 September [O.S. 6 September] 1887 – 26 February 1939) was a Soviet politician, state and Communist Party official and party publicist. He was a member of Joseph Stalin's inner circle, before falling victim to the Great Purge.

In 2010, a court in Kyiv refused to posthumously rehabilitate Postyshev, citing his complicity in "genocide" because of his part in causing the Holodomor, mass famine in Ukraine in the early 1930s.

== Early career ==
Postyshev was born in Ivanovo-Voznesensk in Vladimir Governorate to the family of a Russian weaver. He was a member of the Russian Social-Democratic Labour Party from 1904, and later joined the Bolshevik faction, and worked full-time, illegally, as a party organiser. Arrested on 24 April (old style) 1908, he spent four years in Vladimir Central Prison, and then was deported to the Irkutsk region. During the October Revolution, he played a major role in bringing Irkutsk under Bolshevik control, and then in creating the Far Eastern Republic. In 1923, he was transferred to Ukraine to supervise the organization of the Communist Party committee in the Kiev Governorate (guberniya) in central Ukraine. In 1925, Postyshev became secretary of the Central Committee of the Communist Party (Bolshevik) of Ukraine, or CP(b)U. Between 1926 and 1930 he was a member of the Politburo and Organizational Bureau of Ukraine's Communist Party. At the 15th Congress of the All-Union Communist Party (Bolsheviks), in December 1927, he was elected a member of the Central Committee.

In July 1930, Postyshev was transferred to Moscow, as the Secretary of the Central Committee, in charge of propaganda and organization. This was a time of upheaval in the countryside across the Soviet Union, as Joseph Stalin forced through a policy of driving the peasants onto collective farms. In May 1930, Pravda published a signed article by Postyshev castigating party officials in Ukraine who complained that collectivisation was being driven ahead too quickly.

In Moscow, he was part of the inner leadership, despite not being a member of the Politburo. The chairman of the Russian federal government, Sergey Syrtsov, complained in November 1930 that "everything is decided behind the back of the Politburo by a tiny group", which, he said, included Postyshev, while nominally more senior figures such as Kliment Voroshilov and Janis Rudzutaks were excluded.

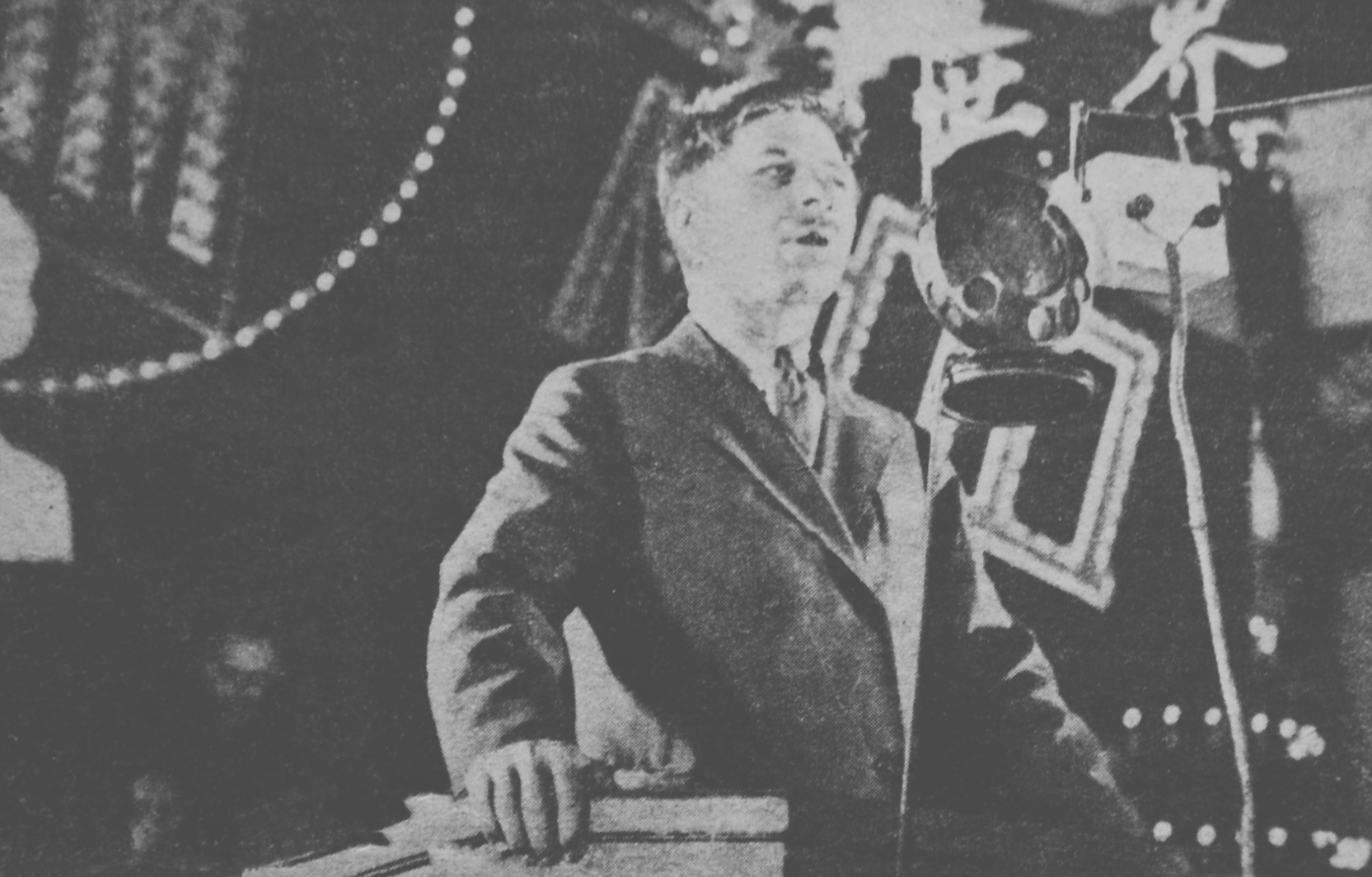
Postyshev speaks at the House of the Unions on 5 September 1931

In December 1932, he was dispatched to the Lower Volga region, where there were particular difficulties enforcing grain collection. When a district official in Balashov complained that "we have nothing left to winnow or thresh", Postyshev sacked him on the spot. On 12 June, the territorial party committee stated that, without Postyshev's help, it would not have met its grain procurement target. The arrests and food shortages caused the population in the territory to fall by about a million over 18 months.

== Role in the Holodomor ==
On 18 September 1932, Postyshev sent a telegram to the Ukrainian party leadership ordering them to meet their quota for exporting grain, in spite of warnings that forced collectivisation was causing mass starvation. This was the first piece of evidence cited by the Kyiv Court of Appeal in finding Postyshev posthumously guilty of genocide. Later that month, he was sent back to Ukraine to enforce grain collection, starting in Dnipropetrovsk.

On 24 January 1933, Postyshev was appointed Second Secretary of the Central Committee of the Ukraine CP, and first secretary of the Kharkiv city and Kharkiv Oblast Party organizations. Though nominally junior to the First Secretary, Stanisław Kosior, he "functioned as Stalin's direct emissary, a kind of governor-general of Ukraine". Postyshev criticized the Ukrainian Communists for their "lack of Bolshevik vigilance" in Stalin's systematic enforcement of increased grain quotas. His party activists conducted a brutal campaign through farms and homes, searching for suspected hiding places and confiscating every bit of grain, with disregard for the starvation they encountered. Millions died in the famine of 1932–33.

During his first tour of the Ukrainian countryside, Postyshev took his 18-year-old son Valentin with him. The youth was so distressed by the spectacle of starvation that his father assembled the family when they returned home and ordered them all not to conduct anti-Party conversations at home.

Before Postyshev's return, the Communist Party had encouraged, or at least permitted, the use of the Ukrainian language in schools, and the teaching of Ukrainian history and language in universities. Early efforts by the Bolsheviks encouraging regional autonomy and supporting minority groups were intended to monopolize their support among said groups, and to undermine the burgeoning efforts of anti-Communist nationalists.

The university courses were closed down in January 1933, and in June, Postyshev accused the Ukraine People's Commissar for Education Mykola Skrypnyk of "wrecking" the schools and universities by allowing "Petliurite swine" to gain control – "and you often defended them". Skrypnyk committed suicide soon afterwards.

This was the start of a purge of such "nests of nationalist counter-revolutionaries" targeting the commissariats of education, agriculture, and legal workers, not to mention newspapers, journals, encyclopedias and film studios, during which over 15,000 officials were eliminated on charges of "nationalism", and thousands of authors, scholars, philosophers, artists, musicians and editors were exiled to labour camps, executed, or simply disappeared. The writer Mykhailo Yalovy and the "national communist" Oleksandr Shumsky were among those arrested, while the writer Mykola Khvylovy avoided arrest by committing suicide. Many others avoided being denounced by working according to Moscow dictates.

The Ukrainian Communist Party was also targeted. In a prelude to the Great Purge, Postyshev forced the sacking of 237 secretaries of district party committees and 249 chairmen of district executive committees. Almost 100,000 members were expelled during his first year in Ukraine and a further 168,000 through 1938. Postyshev wrote in his report that the majority were exiled or shot. The highest ranking were paraded through elaborate show trials.

As the purges progressed after 1933, affecting millions throughout the Soviet Union, Postyshev's crackdown spread beyond perceived "Ukrainianizers," "nationalists," and opponents of collectivization. Eventually it came to include the liquidation of entire classes, such as kulaks, priests, people who had been members of anti-Bolshevik armies, and even ethnic Ukrainians who had travelled abroad or immigrated from Galicia.

In February 1934, Postyshev was elected a candidate member of the Politburo. In 1934–37, after the Ukrainian capital had been moved from Kharkov to Kyiv, he was First Secretary of the Kyiv Party Committee. In this role, he oversaw the "socialist reconstruction" of the city, which involved the destruction of churches and monuments, and Orthodox and Jewish cemeteries.

Postyshev is known for reviving the New Year tree tradition in the Soviet Union. A letter from Postyshev published in Pravda on 28 December 1935, called for the installation of New Year trees in schools, children's homes, Young Pioneer Palaces, children's clubs, children's theaters, and cinemas.

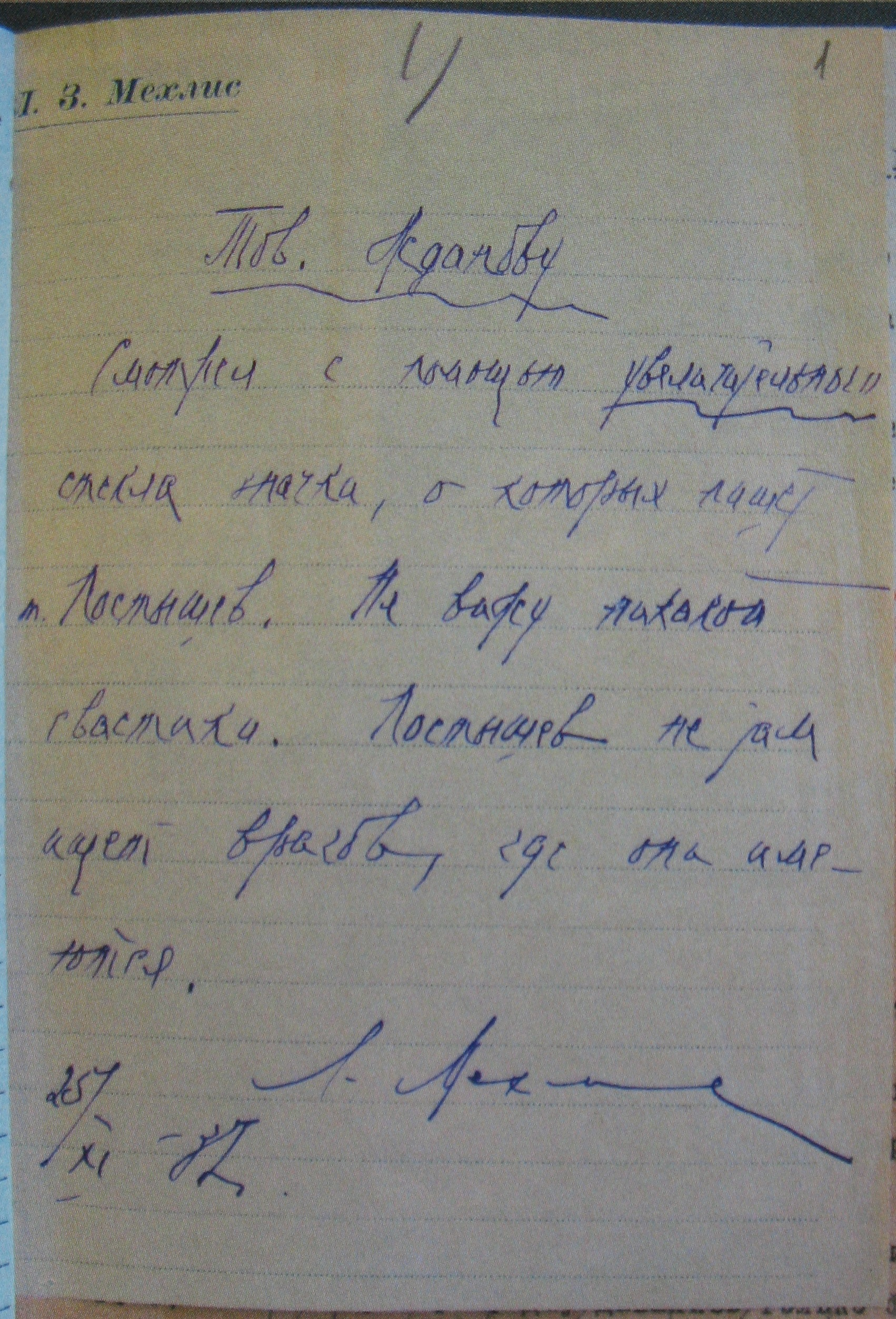
Lev Mekhlis letter to Zhdanov: "Postyshev searches enemies not where they really are"

== Downfall ==
At the start of the Great Purge, Postyshev appeared to be well placed to survive and benefit from it. Defendants at the first of the Moscow Show Trials in August 1936 were made to confess to having planned to assassinate eight leading communists, including Stalin, the late Sergei Kirov, and Postyshev.

But in January 1937 he was removed from his post as First Secretary of the Kyiv party organisation, while retaining his other positions. He had purged the party organisation with his normal ruthlessness, but had acquired powerful enemies who accused him of purging good communists while leaving suspected oppositionists in position. During a Central Committee plenum in June 1936, Nikolay Yezhov, whose name would become synonymous with the Great Purge, or 'Yezhovschina', accused him of persecuting innocent Communist Party members in Kyiv, without giving details. In November, Stalin took up the case of a woman named Nikolayenko, whom Postyshev had expelled from the Kyiv party for making a series of malicious denunciations. She was reinstated, though she was denounced years later, after Stalin's death, as "one of the worst slanderers."

At the critical plenum of the Central Committee in February 1937, which decided the fate of Nikolai Bukharin and Alexei Rykov, who had led the opposition to collectivisation, Postyshev continually jeered at them as they tried to defend themselves and voted for both men to be arrested and shot. But when Nikita Khrushchev delivered his 'Secret Speech' to the 20th Party congress in 1956, he said that during the same plenum, Postyshev protested about the recent arrest of a Ukraine-based Communist official named Karpov, who he said had been wrongly accused of being a Trotskyite. In a sharp exchange, Stalin demanded "What are you, actually?" and Postyshev replied: "I am a Bolshevik, comrade Stalin, a Bolshevik".

On 17 March 1937, Postyshev was removed from his post in Ukraine, and appointed First Secretary of the Kuibyshev (Samara) regional party committee, a drastic demotion that was supposedly his chance to "correct his errors". He was accused of having an "un-Bolshevik style of work", and of allowing Trotskyists to flourish in the Kyiv party organisation. With Postyshev in charge, Kuibyshev "was purged of 'enemies' with a savagery unexampled even in other regions. Postyshev ... changed many of the sentences sent to him for his signature, requiring death where the procurator and investigator thought eight or ten years in confinement were sufficient". He had 3,300 party members expelled and 35 out of 65 district party committees disbanded. In one district, 64 out of 200 Communist Party members were expelled.

In January 1938, Postyshev was hauled in front of the Central Committee and accused, for a second time, of persecuting innocent communists. He justified himself on the grounds that "the soviet and party leaderships were in enemy hands, from the regional leadership at the top to the district leadership at the bottom." He was removed from his post in Kuibyshev, and was arrested on 21 February 1938. His arrest came after he was denounced by Lev Mekhlis, who feared that Postyshev's repression might affect him. In prison, Postyshev 'confessed' to having been a spy for Japan since 1920, and to having been part of a 'counter-revolutionary Right-Trotskyist organisation' operating in Ukraine since 1934. The NKVD officer who interrogated him, K.I.Tserpento, later admitted that Postyshev's 'confession' was written by his interrogators and handed to him to sign. Until he saw the document, he did not know what he was expected to confess to.

Postyshev was shot in Butyrka prison on 21 February 1939 and buried in Moscow's Donskoye Cemetery. Nikita Khrushchev, along with Vyacheslav Molotov and Nikolai Yezhov, were sent to take over Postyshev's post in Ukraine. Khrushchev had to be appointed by Moscow; he could not be elected because, after Postyshev's removal, the entire Central Committee of the CP(b)U "had been purged spotless", according to Khrushchev.

== Family ==
Postyshev wed his first wife Anastasia Konovalova in Siberia. Together they had his first son, Valentin (1916–1938). Valentin, who had initially been so distressed by the plight of the Ukrainian peasants, later enrolled at an aviation school in Yeysk, where he was appointed secretary of the school Komsomol organisation. He reputedly came to copy his father's example for ruthlessness. He was arrested on the same day as his father, 21 February 1938. According to one source, he was shot on 26 August 1938, when he was aged 23, though it has also been reported that he was in a labour camp in Kolyma and was sentenced to death there, for refusing to work, and shot.

Postyshev's second wife, Tatiana Semyonovna Postolovskaya (1899–1938) was also an Old Bolshevik and a high ranking Communist Party official. In 1934, she was appointed Secretary of the Party committee of the All-Ukrainian Association of Scientific-Research Marxist–Leninist Institutes. In February 1935, a Communist named M. Garin, whose wife had been expelled from the party at Postolovskaya's instigation, wrote to Stalin complaining that she "is not distinguished either for her intellect or her experience" but exercised "unlimited authority" because she was married to Postyshev. She was expelled from the Communist Party early in 1937. She was arrested on the same day as her husband, and shot on 26 August 1938.

They had two more sons. Leonid (1920–2008) was arrested in 1939 and sentenced to ten years in the gulag, but survived and had his conviction overturned in 1955 and became a prominent economist. Vladimir (born 1922) was 15 or 16 years old when he was arrested, on 22 August 1938. In 1939, he was sentenced to five years in the gulag, as a "socially dangerous person". After he had completed that term, he was rearrested and sentenced to a further ten years. There is a story that when the two surviving brothers met, when their father was being "rehabilitated" in 1955, they did not recognise each other. Vladimir, then in his 30s, died soon afterwards.

== Legacy ==
The city of Pokrovsk was briefly (1934–1938) named Postyshevo (or Postysheve, as rendered in Ukrainian) after him. The name of the city was changed following his removal from power and subsequent execution. A football club in Poltava was briefly named after him as was the factory that owned the club.

Postyshev was rehabilitated on 1 June 1955.

== Sources ==
- Magocsi, Paul Robert (1996). A History of Ukraine. Toronto: University of Toronto Press. ISBN 0-8020-0830-5.
- Subtelny, Orest (1988). Ukraine: A History, 1st edition, Toronto: University of Toronto Press. ISBN 0-8020-8390-0.
