= Karl Bauman =

Latvian-Soviet politician and Communist Party member

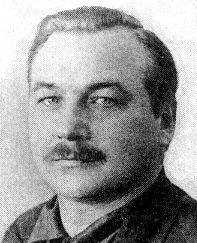
Bauman c. 1930

Karl Yanovich Bauman (Russian: Карл Янович Бауман, Latvian: Kārlis Baumanis; August 29, 1892 – October 14, 1937) was a Latvian-born Soviet politician and Communist Party functionary.

== Early years ==
He was born in Viļķene Parish, Kreis Wolmar, Governorate of Livonia, Russian Empire to the family of a Latvian peasant; his father died while he was still young.

After the revolution of 1905, he joined the Latvian Social Democratic Workers' Party (LSDSP), known at the time as the "Social-Democracy of the Latvian Territory", in 1907. He studied at the agricultural school in Pskov, but in 1908 he was arrested for illegal political activity and imprisoned. He also conducted illegal political work in Lemzale, Kyiv, and Saratov. He studied at the Kyiv Commercial Institute (1913–1916).

== Soviet career ==
He participated in the October Revolution of 1917 in Kyiv. From December 14, 1920, to May 9, 1923, he was the executive secretary of the Kursk gubernatorial committee of the Russian Communist Party (Bolsheviks) ("RCP(b)"). He was also the chair of the Kursk provincial trade union council during this period. In 1923–1924, he was deputy head of the Organizational and Instructor Department of the Central Committee of the RCP(b). From September 1924, he was deputy head of the organisation department of the Moscow regional communist party, which at that time was controlled by Nikolai Uglanov. He was a member of the Central Committee of the Communist Party of the Soviet Union, from 1925 until 1937.

In 1928, when Joseph Stalin decided to embark on a campaign to force peasant farmers to give up their individual holding and move onto collective farms, he was opposed by almost every senior party official in the Moscow region, except Bauman, who as early as November 1927 had suggested that entire rural settlements, and even entire districts, should be collectivised. As head of the Department for Rural Work of the Central Committee of the RCP(b), (now named the All-Union Communist Party of Bolsheviks) in 1928–29, and a member of the Organizational Bureau of the Central Committee Orgburo from April 1928, Bauman was one of the most zealous supporters of collectivization by any means.

In April 1929, Bauman was appointed First Secretary of the Moscow provincial party committee, a secretary opf the Central Committee, and a candidate member of the Politburo, making him one of the dozen or so most powerful officials in the Soviet Union. He was also chairman of the commission responsible for policy on the kulak, or wealthy peasants. As the Moscow party boss, he distinguished himself by driving collectivisation through at a rapid pace. When the party secretary from one of the Moscow districts reported to the regional bureau in February 1930 that they had succeeded in moving 82.4 per cent of peasant households onto collective farms, in less than two years, Bauman told them it was "too little".

On 2 March 1930, Pravda published Dizzy with Success, Stalin's warning that 'petty officials' had been pushing collectivisation too rapidly. Bauman was made the most prominent scapegoat for these excesses. On 18 April 1930 the Politburo decided that he was guilty of having "displayed appeasement toward 'leftist deviationists'", and was four days later he was sacked from his post in April 1930 and replaced by Lazar Kaganovich, who then sacked 153 senior official of the Moscow region. on 22 April, Bauman admitted that "we undoubtedly got too far ahead, undoubtedly got carried away." Despite this and other confessions of error, he was removed from his position on the Politburo at the 16th party congress in July 1930, though he retained his rank as a secretary of the Central Committee.

In 1931–1934, Bauman was the first secretary of the Central Asian Bureau of the Central Committee of the All-Union Communist Party of Bolsheviks. There he conducted such an extensive purge, such that Kaganovich reported to Stalin in September 1931 that "arrests of officials there are continuously increasing - what is to be done?" On 1 December, the Politburo overruled Bauman, who had proposed to have the president and prime minister of Tajikstan removed and arrested."

In 1934, Bauman was recalled to Moscow and appointed head of the Scientific and Technical Inventions and Discoveries and the Planning, Financial and Trade departments of the Central Committee of the All-Union Communist Party of Bolsheviks. As head of the science department, he was involved in the dispute between geneticists, involving Nikolai Vavilov, who was posthumously recognised as one of the leading scientists of his generation, and Trofim Lysenko, whose theories are now discredited, but who at the time had the support of Stalin and Molotov. In a letter to Stalin and Molotov, Bauman warned that "many" scientists considered Lysenko's "overall genetic views to be wrong, contradicting modern science" and that they created "a not completely healthy atmosphere."

== Arrest, killing and rehabilitation ==
On April 14, 1937, he was removed from his post. He was arrested by the NKVD of the USSR on October 12, 1937, as a part of the so-called "Latvian Operation". He was immediately subjected to severe beatings, and two days after his arrest, killed in Lefortovo prison on October 14. There is only one document in the Bauman case, a statement written by him on the day of his death, covered in blood.

After the death of Joseph Stalin in 1953, he was rehabilitated (posthumously exonerated) by the Chief Military Prosecutor's Office on July 15, 1955, and by the USSR Prosecutor's Office on June 23, 1989; on August 19, 1955, he was reinstated in the party.
