= Dutcher =

Dutcher is a surname. Notable people with the surname include:

- Adelaide Dutcher (fl. 1901), American physician and public health worker
- Brian Dutcher (born 1959), American basketball coach
- George Matthew Dutcher (1874–1959), American historian and professor
- James L. Dutcher (1918–1992), American football coach
- Jamie Dutcher (born c. 1962), American naturalist, filmmaker and author
- Jeremy Dutcher (born 1990), Canadian Indigenous musician and activist
- Jim Dutcher (born 1943), American naturalist, cinematographer, director and author
- Jim Dutcher (basketball) (born 1933), former head basketball coach at the University of Minnesota
- John B. Dutcher (1830–1911), New York politician
- John R. Dutcher (born 1961), Canadian physicist
- Judi Dutcher (born 1962), American attorney and former politician
- Raymond Dutcher (1885–1975), American fencer
- Richard Dutcher (born 1964), American independent filmmaker
- Silas Belden Dutcher (1829–1909), New York politician
- William Dutcher (1846–1920), America businessman and ornithologist

== See also ==
- Ducher (surname)
