= Takaya: Lone Wolf =

Takaya: Lone Wolf is a documentary film which premiered on CBC’s The Nature of Things in October 2019. The film documents the life of Takaya, a wild lone wolf, and the development of his unique relationship with conservation photographer Cheryl Alexander.

After the film's release in Canada, it was subsequently broadcast on BBC in the United Kingdom and on ARTE in France and Germany.

== Synopsis ==
The film follows Alexander as she travels alone to Discovery Island by boat, seeking to observe and learn about the wolf. She is intrigued by the mystery of his story, wondering where he came from, how he has adapted to a marine environment, and why he has chosen to live a life of solitude, over 40 kilometres away from the nearest wolf packs.

Alexander begins by setting up hidden trail cameras on the island and shooting over a thousand hours of video footage of the wolf. Over time, Alexander learns that he has adapted to his new environment in remarkable ways, learning to hunt unfamiliar prey and learning to dig for water during periods of drought. She also traces his history by collecting photographic evidence of his journey through the city, and seeks to gain a deeper understanding of his behaviour by interviewing wolf experts and journeying to Yellowstone National Park, which is home to some of the best-studied wolves in the world.

== Production ==
The documentary was co-directed by Mary Margaret Frymire and Martin Williams and produced by Williams for Talesmith, André Barro for Cineflix, and Gaby Bastyra.

Martin Williams' films have won critical acclaim and numerous industry awards, including three Emmys. Amongst many other films, he has produced films with David Attenborough, Stephen Hawking, and Prince William.

Due to the location of Takaya in Canada, Martin partnered with Cineflix Productions in Montreal and MBMTV Productions in Vancouver to complete the filming. Funding for the project was provided by CBC, Cineflix, BBC and ARTE.

== Cast ==
- Cheryl Alexander, narrating and appearing as herself
- Jamie Dutcher, co-producer of Wolves at our Door and co-founder of Living With Wolves, as herself
- Dr. Fred Harrington, wolf vocalization expert, as himself
- Kira Cassidy, research associate with the Yellowstone Wolf Project, as herself
- Lesley Wolfe-Milner, local resident, as herself
- Doug Paton, local resident, as herself
- Meredith Dickman, lighthouse keeper, as herself
- Paul Harder, local resident, as himself
- Jytte Kaffanke, local resident, as herself
- Mike Sheehan, local resident, as himself
- Takaya

Note: Some cast members do not appear in all versions of the film.

== Release ==
Takaya: Lone Wolf was released in Canada on CBC's The Nature of Things in October 2019. This version of the film had a running time of 44 minutes.

An extended, 60-minute version of the film was released in the United Kingdom on BBC in December 2019.

In February 2020, the French- and German-language versions of the film were released on ARTE in France and Germany.

The film aired on SVTPlay in Sweden in October 2020.

== Awards ==
- Finalist for the Canadian Museum of Nature: Nature Inspiration Awards 2021
- Winner of 2021 Canadian Screen Award: Rob Stewart Award for Best Science or Nature Documentary Program or Series
- Winner of 2020 Leo Awards for Best Short Documentary Program; Best Direction - Short Documentary Program; Best Screenwriting - Short Documentary Program; and Best Cinematography - Short Documentary Program
- Shortlisted for the Grierson Award for Best Natural History Documentary
- Finalist for the Latin American Nature Award for Best Documentary
- Nominated for the Yorkton Film Festival award for Documentary Science/Nature/Technology
- Selected for the Wildlife Conservation Film Festival in New York City
- Selected for screening at Sedona Wolf Week
- Selected for the International Wildlife Film Festival
- Selected for the Sunset Film Festival Los Angeles

== Cultural and Political Impacts ==
Since the release of the film, artists from around the world have created artistic tributes to Takaya, including music, paintings, sculptures, and jewelry. Over 80 of these pieces were showcased at the Takaya Lone Wolf International Arts Festival in Victoria on October 24, 2020.

Several public art installations have also been created to honour Takaya's life and legacy.

- Victoria mural artist Paul Archer has painted a larger-than-life mural of Takaya on the side of a lighthouse building on Discovery Island, where Takaya once lived.
- Local artist Kent Laforme has received a commission to create a sculpture of Takaya from a 25,000 pound block of marble.
- Sculptor Tanya Bub has created a five-foot, 150 pound driftwood sculpture of Takaya, which was displayed temporarily at the historic Empress Hotel in Victoria.

Takaya's story has also inspired political campaigns. Over 65,000 people have signed Takaya's Legacy Petition to stop wolf hunting in British Columbia. Two nonprofit organizations, Pacific Wild and Raincoast Conservation Foundation, have also used Takaya's story in campaigns to end the recreational killing and government culling of wolves.
