= Jemmy Jones Island =

Island in British Columbia, Canada

Coordinates: 48°26′41″N 123°16′23″W

Jemmy Jones Island is an island in British Columbia, Canada. It's located off the coast of Oak Bay in the Oak Bay Islands Ecological Reserve in the Strait of Georgia northwest of the Chatham Islands and Discovery Island.

The island was named after Captain James "Jemmy" Jones, who crashed his schooner, the Jenny Jones, into the island.
