= Discovery Island =

Discovery Island may refer to:

- Discovery Island (Bahamas), a private island off the coast of Nassau, Bahamas
- Discovery Island (Bay Lake), an island and former attraction at Disney's Animal Kingdom in Florida, United States
- Discovery Island (British Columbia), a small island near Victoria, British Columbia, Canada
- Discovery Island (Disney's Animal Kingdom), an attraction at Disney's Animal Kingdom in Florida, United States
- Discovery Islands, an archipelago near Campbell River, British Columbia, Canada
