= Mogilev electoral district =

Constituency of the Russian Republic

Mogilev
- Former Civilian constituency for the All-Russian Constituent Assembly
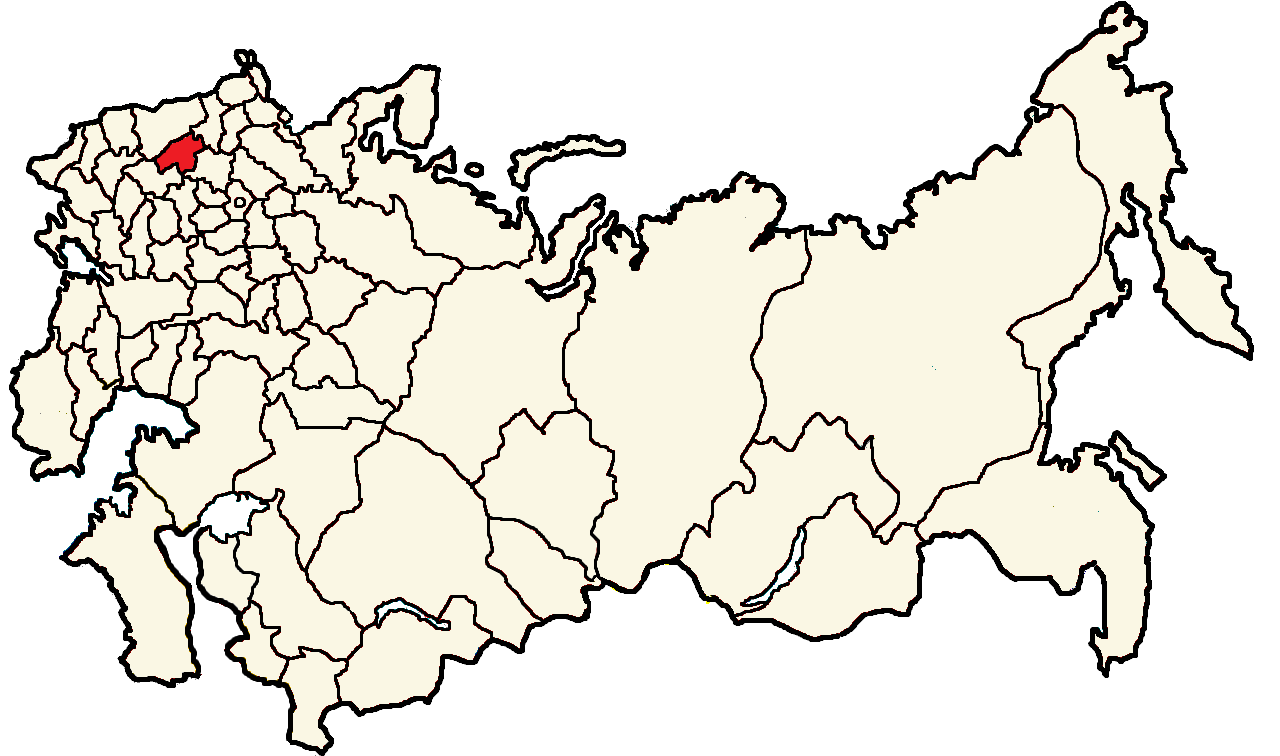

Former constituency
- Created: 1917
- Abolished: 1918
- Number of members: 15
- Number of Uyezd Electoral Commissions: 11
- Number of Urban Electoral Commissions: 2
- Number of Parishes: 146

The Mogilev electoral district (Russian: Могилевский избирательный округ) was a constituency created for the 1917 Russian Constituent Assembly election.

The electoral district covered the Mogilev Governorate. The SRs benefited from the fact that the leader heading the Mogilev Provincial Soviet of Peasants Deputies was largely popular in the province.

According to U.S. historian Oliver Henry Radkey, whose account forms the basis of the results in the table below, the vote count in Mogilev is largely incomplete. He claims to have the data for Gomel (with the votes for all 11 lists), Mogilev (with votes for the 7 most voted lists) and Orsha (with votes for the 6 most votes lists) towns as well as 80 precincts in Gomel uezd (but in these precincts, only the vote for SR and Bolshevik lists). The account of Soviet historian L. M. Spirin, shown to the right in the table and which Radkey did not consider reliable, includes a much greater number of votes accounted for the Mogilev electoral district.

In Gomel town, per Spirin's account, the Jewish National Electoral Committee obtained 6,010 votes (27.6%), Kadets 3,957 (18.2%), Menshevik-Bund 3,370 votes (15.5%), Bolsheviks 2,012 (9.3%), SRs 1,848 votes (8.5%), Polish list 1,584 votes (7.3%), United Jewish Socialist Labour Party 1,497 votes (6.9%), Poalei-Zion 761 votes (3.5%), White Russians 370 votes (1.7%), Landowners 220 votes (1%) and Folkspartei 114 votes (0.5%). Per the Menshevik newspaper Vpered the Zionists got 6,173 votes in Gomel town, the Kadets 4,051 votes, the Mensheviks and Bund 3,448 votes, the Bolsheviks 2,139 votes, the SRs 1,912 votes, the Poles 1,620 votes and the Jewish Socialists 1,539 votes.

== Results ==
Mogilev
Party	Vote (Radkey)	% (Radkey)	Vote (Spirin)	% (Spirin)
List 1 - Socialist-Revolutionaries and Soviet of Peasants Deputies	50,684	37.55	511,998	70.62
List 11 - Bolsheviks	28,446	21.07	93,060	12.83
List 6 - Kadets	14,494	10.74	19,316	2.66
List 9 - Jewish National Electoral Committee	14,101	10.45	42,037	5.80
List 2 - Mensheviks-Bund	10,549	7.81	21,664	2.99
List 4 - Jewish Soc.-Dem. Labour Party (Poalei Zion)	7,900	5.85	2,596	0.36
List 10 - Mogilev Governorate Polish Council	4,635	3.43	15,981	2.20
List 3 - United Jewish Socialist Labour Party (S.S. and E.S.)	1,583	1.17	4,004	0.55
List 8 - White Russian Organizations	1,385	1.03	2,523	0.35
List 5 - Union of Landowners	293	0.22	10,136	1.40
List 7 - Yidishe Folkspartei and Non-Party Democratic Committee			1,737	0.24
Unaccounted	924	0.68		
Total:	134,994		725,052	

Deputies Elected
Buslov	SR
Khrisanenkov	SR
Kovarsky	SR
Maleev	SR
Malyshitsky	SR
Rappoport	SR
Shishaev	SR
Tsvetaev	SR
Vasilevsky	SR
Voronov	SR
Zakrevsky	SR
Zasorin	SR
Kaganovich	Bolshevik
Leplevsky	Bolshevik
Friedman	Jewish National Committee
Mazeh	Jewish National Committee
