= Orenburg electoral district =

Constituency of the Russian Republic

Orenburg
- Former Civilian constituency for the All-Russian Constituent Assembly
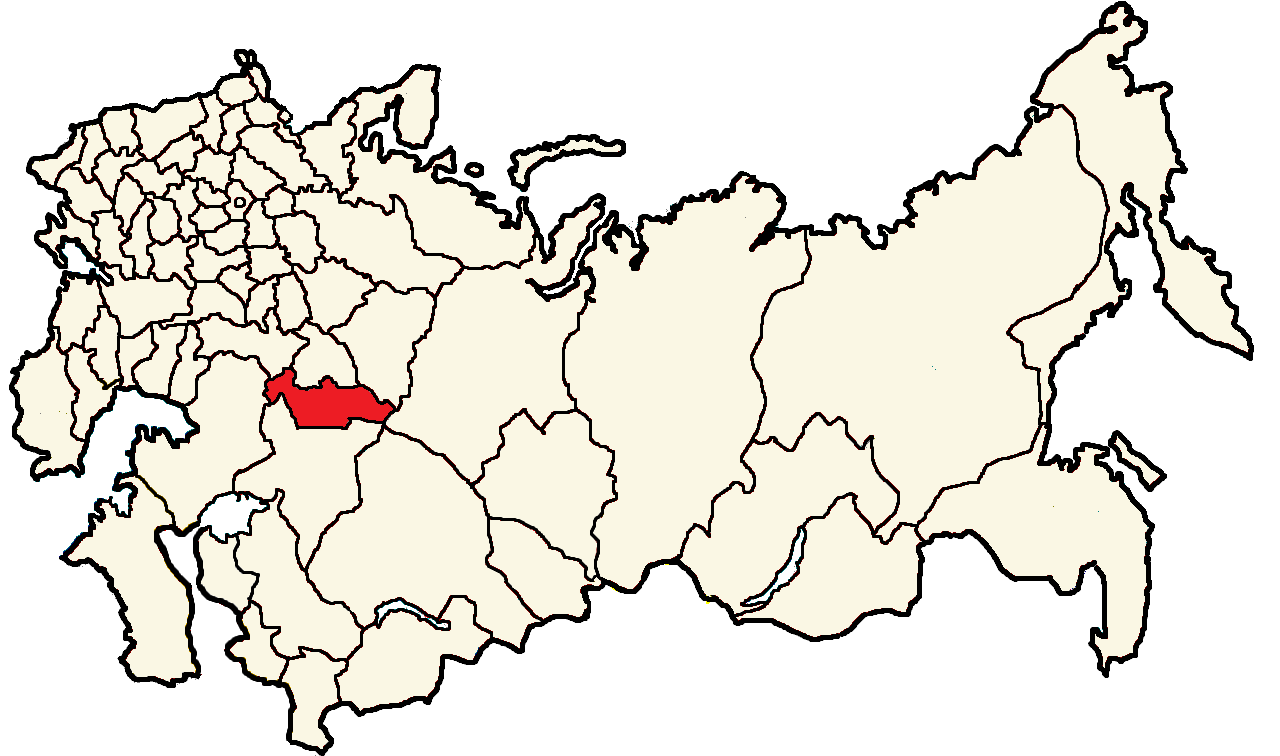

Former constituency
- Created: 1917
- Abolished: 1918
- Number of members: 12
- Number of Uyezd Electoral Commissions: 5
- Number of Urban Electoral Commissions: 2
- Number of Parishes: 154

The Orenburg electoral district (Russian: Оренбургский избирательный округ) was a constituency created for the 1917 Russian Constituent Assembly election.

The electoral district covered the Orenburg Governorate. Initially eleven seats were allocated to the Orenburg district, but a decree from the Provisional Government issued on October 27, 1917 increased the number of seats to 12.

According to U.S. historian Oliver Henry Radkey, who is the source for the results table below, his account of the Bashkir Federalist vote is underestimated, believing that the real figure would have landed at around 100,000.

== Results ==
Orenburg
Party	Vote	%
List 8 - Bolsheviks	163,425	24.14
List 2 - Orenburg Cossack Host	144,039	21.28
List 3 - Socialist-Revolutionaries	110,172	16.28
List 9 - Bashkir Federalists	51,787	7.65
List 1 - Kadets	24,757	3.66
List 5 - Muslim Association	16,652	2.46
List 4 - Mensheviks	7,544	1.11
List 6 - Cooperative	7,296	1.08
List 7 - Popular Socialists	5,681	0.84
Unaccounted	145,512	21.50
Total:	676,865	

Deputies Elected
Dutov	Cossack
Krivoschekov	Cossack
Matushkin	Cossack
Myakutin	Cossack
Bogdanov	Cossack
Polyakov	SR
Sorokin	SR
Chutskaya	Bolshevik
Korostelev	Bolshevik
Zwilling	Bolshevik
Bikbov	Bashkir Federalist
Fakhretdinov	Bashkir Federalist
Manatov	Bashkir Federalist
