= John Dutcher =

John Dutcher may refer to:

- John B. Dutcher (1830–1911), American politician from New York
- John R. Dutcher (born 1961), Canadian physicist
