= Orgburo of the 17th Congress of the All-Union Communist Party (Bolsheviks) =

Organisational Bureau of Soviet Union (1934–39)

The Orgburo of the 17th Congress of the All-Union Communist Party (Bolsheviks) was in session from 1934 to 1939.

== Composition ==
=== Members ===
| Name (birth–death) | Took office | Left office | Duration | Note |
|---|---|---|---|---|
| Yan Gamarnik (1894–1937) | 10 February 1934 | 31 May 1937 | 3 years, 110 days | — |
| Nikolai Yezhov (1895–1940) | 10 February 1934 | 3 March 1939 | 5 years, 21 days | — |
| Andrei Zhdanov (1896–1948) | 10 February 1934 | 22 March 1939 | 5 years, 40 days | — |
| Lazar Kaganovich (1893–1991) | 10 February 1934 | 22 March 1939 | 5 years, 40 days | — |
| Sergei Kirov (1886–1934) | 10 February 1934 | 1 December 1934 | 294 days | — |
| Alexander Kosarev (1903–1939) | 10 February 1934 | 22 March 1939 | 5 years, 40 days | Was arrested on 28 November 1938 on counter-revolutionary charges. |
| Valerian Kuybyshev (1888–1935) | 10 February 1934 | 25 January 1935 | 349 days | — |
| Joseph Stalin (1878–1953) | 10 February 1934 | 22 March 1939 | 5 years, 40 days | — |
| Aleksey Stetsky (1896–1938) | 10 February 1934 | 22 March 1939 | 5 years, 40 days | Was arrested on 26 April 1938 on counter-revolutionary charges. |
| Nikolay Shvernik (1888–1970) | 10 February 1934 | 22 March 1939 | 5 years, 40 days | — |
| Andrey Andreyev (1895–1971) | 10 March 1935 | 22 March 1939 | 4 years, 12 days | Appointed by questionnaire. |
| Lev Mekhlis (1889–1953) | 14 January 1938 | 22 March 1939 | 1 year, 67 days | Elected by the 13th Plenary Session. |

=== Candidates ===
| Name (birth–death) | Took office | Left office | Duration | Note |
|---|---|---|---|---|
| Mikhail Kaganovich (1888–1941) | 10 February 1934 | 22 March 1939 | 5 years, 40 days | |
| Alexander Krinitsky (1894–1937) | 10 February 1934 | 12 October 1937 | 3 years, 244 days | Relieved of his duties at the 12th Plenary Session. |
