= Lazar Kaganovich =

Soviet politician (1893–1991)

- Лазарь Каганович
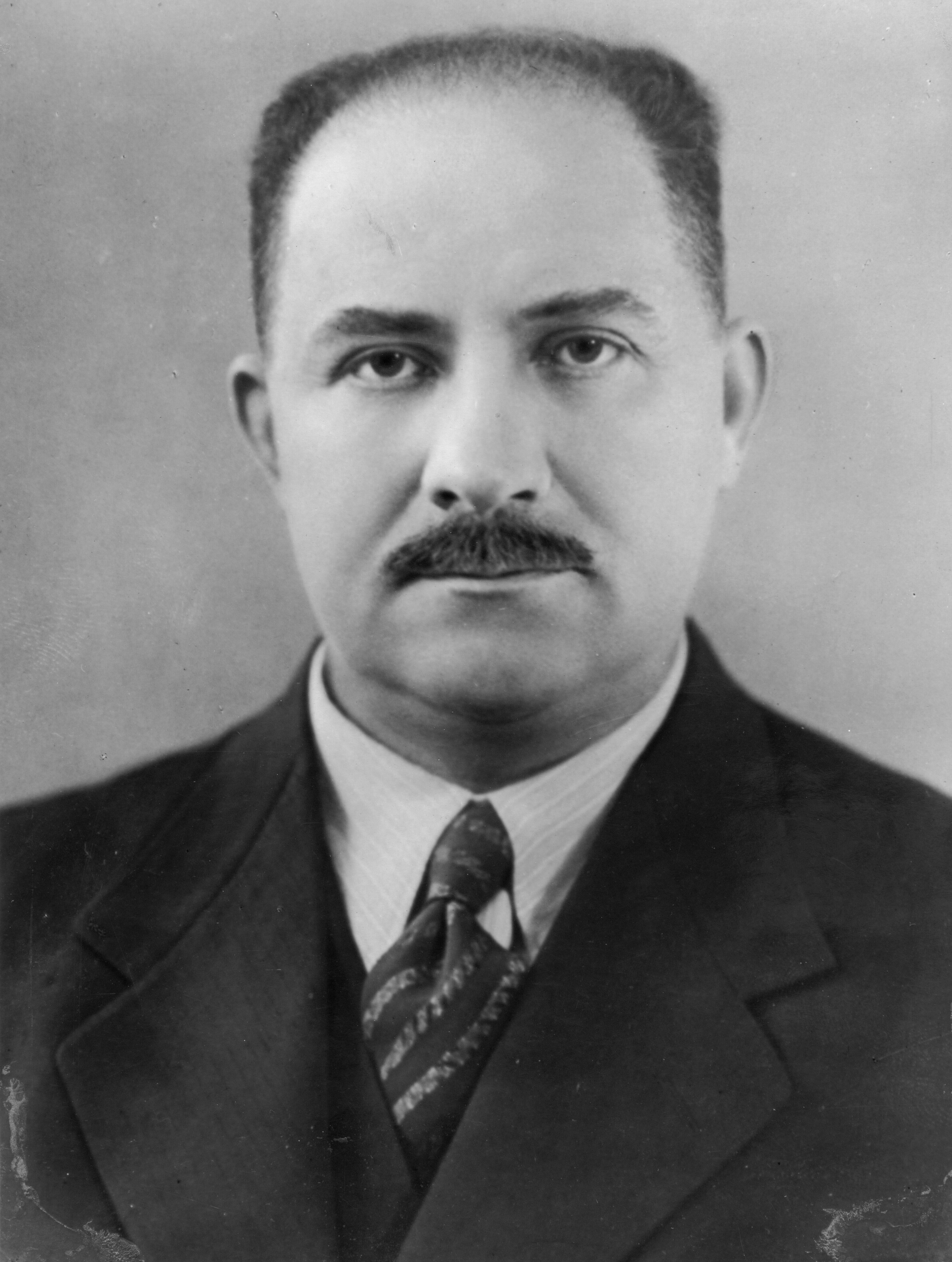
- Kaganovich in 1950

First Deputy Premier of the Soviet Union
- In office 5 March 1953 – 29 June 1957
- Premier: Georgy Malenkov; Nikolai Bulganin; Nikita Khrushchev
- Preceded by: Lavrentiy Beria
- Succeeded by: Anastas Mikoyan

Deputy Premier of the Soviet Union
- In office 21 August 1938 – 5 March 1953
- Premier: Vyacheslav Molotov; Joseph Stalin

Second Secretary of the Communist Party of the Soviet Union
- In office 13 July 1930 – 21 March 1939
- Leader: Joseph Stalin
- Preceded by: Vyacheslav Molotov
- Succeeded by: Andrei Zhdanov

Personal details
- Born: Lazar Moiseyevich Kaganovich; 22 November 1893 Kabany, Kiev Governorate, Russian Empire
- Died: 25 July 1991 (aged 97) Moscow, Russian SFSR, Soviet Union
- Resting place: Novodevichy Cemetery, Moscow
- Party: RSDLP (Bolsheviks) (1911–1918); CPSU (1918–1961)
- Relatives: Israel Kaganovich (brother); Aron Kaganovich (brother); Mikhail Kaganovich (brother); Yuli Kaganovich (brother)
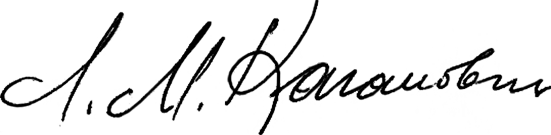
- Signature
- Central institution membership: 1930–1957: Full Member, 16th, 17th, 18th, 19th and 20th Politburo; 1926–1930: Candidate Member, 14th & 15th Politburo; 1924–25 & 1928–1939: Member, 13th, 15th, 16th, and 17th Secretariat; 1924–26 & 1928–1946: Member, 13th, 15th, 16th, 17th & 18th Orgburo; 1924–57: Full member, 13th, 14th, 15th, 16th, 17th, 18th, 19th, 20th Central Committee; Other offices held: 1955–1956: Chairman of State Committee on Labor and Salary; 1948–1952: Chairman of State Committee on Materiel-Technical Supply for National Economy; 1944–47 & 1956–57: Minister of Construction Materials Industry; 1941: Chairman of Council on Evacuation; 1939–40:People's Commissar of Oil Industry; 1939: People's Commissar of Fuel Industry; 1937–39: People's Commissar of Heavy Industry; 1935–37,1938–42 & 1943–44: People's Commissar for Transport; 1931–1934: First Secretary of the Communist Party of Moscow; 1930–1935: First Secretary of the Communist Party of Moscow Oblast; 1925–28 & 1947: First Secretary of the Communist Party of Ukraine; 1918: Member of the All-Russian Constituent Assembly for Mogilev Governate

Lazar Moiseyevich Kaganovich (Note: Also rendered as Kahanovich) (Russian: Лазарь Моисеевич Каганович; 22 November [O.S. 10 November] 1893 – 25 July 1991) was a Soviet politician and one of Joseph Stalin's closest associates.

Born to a Jewish family in Ukraine, Kaganovich worked as a shoemaker and joined the Russian Social Democratic Labour Party in 1911. During and after the 1917 October Revolution, he held leading positions in Bolshevik organizations in modern day Belarus and Russia, and helped consolidate Soviet rule in Turkestan. In 1922, Stalin placed Kaganovich in charge of an organizational department of the Communist Party, assisting the former in consolidating his grip on the party. Kaganovich was appointed First Secretary of the Communist Party of Ukraine in 1925, and a full member of the Politburo and Stalin's deputy party secretary in 1930.

In 1932–33, he helped enforce grain quotas in Ukraine which contributed to the Ukrainian part of the Soviet famine of 1930-1933. From the mid-1930s on, Kaganovich variously served as the People's Commissar for Railways, Heavy Industry and Oil Industry. Following the outbreak of the Second World War, he was appointed a member of the State Defence Committee.

After Stalin's death in 1953 and the rise of Nikita Khrushchev, Kaganovich quickly lost his influence. After joining in a failed coup against Khrushchev in 1957, Kaganovich was dismissed from the Presidium and demoted to the director of a potash works in Perm and later in a cement works in Sverdlovsk in the Urals. He was expelled from the party in 1961 and lived out his life as a pensioner in Moscow. At his death in 1991, he was the last surviving Old Bolshevik. The Soviet Union itself outlasted him by only five months, dissolving on 26 December 1991.

== Biography ==
=== Early life ===
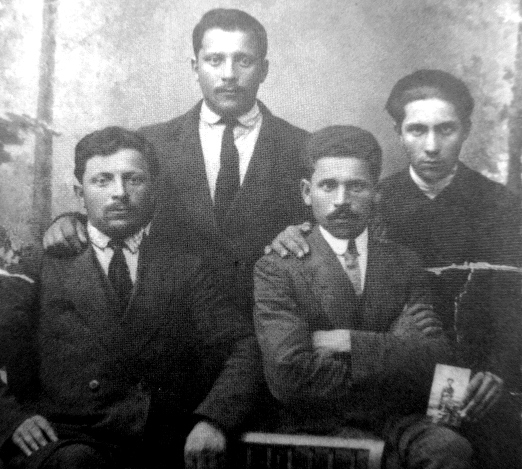
The Kaganovich brothers in Kiev, 1914. Left to right: Israel, Aron, Mikhail, and Lazar.

Kaganovich was born in 1893 to Jewish parents in the village of Kabany, Radomyshl uyezd, Kiev Governorate, Russian Empire (today Dibrova, Kyiv Oblast, Ukraine). Although not from a "fanatically observant" family, according to Kaganovich, he spoke Yiddish at home. He was the son of Moisei Benovich Kaganovich (1863–1923) and Genya Iosifovna Dubinskaya (1860–1933). Of the 13 children born to the family, 6 died in infancy.

Lazar had four elder brothers, all of whom became members of the Bolshevik party. Several of Lazar's brothers ended up occupying positions of varying significance in the Soviet government. Mikhail Kaganovich (1888–1941) served as People's Commissar of Defence Industry before being appointed Head of the People's Commissariat of the Aviation Industry of the USSR, while Yuli Kaganovich (1892–1962) became the 3rd First Secretary of the Gorky Regional Committee of the CPSU. Israel Kaganovich (1884–1973) was made the head of the Main Directorate for Cattle Harvesting of the Ministry of Meat and Dairy Industry. However, Aron Moiseevich Kaganovich (1888–1960s) apparently decided against following his siblings into government, and did not pursue a career in politics. Lazar also had a sister, Rachel Moiseevna Kaganovich (1883–1926), who married Mordechai Ber Lantzman; they lived together in Chernobyl for a period, but she subsequently died in the 1920s and was interred in Kiev.

Lazar Kaganovich left school at 14, to work in shoe factories and cobblers' shops. Around 1911, he joined the Bolshevik party — his older brother Mikhail Kaganovich had become a member in 1905. Early in his political career, in 1915, Kaganovich became a Communist organizer at a shoe factory where he worked.

=== Revolution and Civil War ===
During March and April 1917, he served as the Chairman of the Tanners Union and as the vice-chairman of the Yuzovka Soviet. In May 1917, he became the leader of the military organization of Bolsheviks in Saratov, and in August 1917, he became the leader of the Polessky Committee of the Bolshevik party in Belarus. During the October Revolution of 1917 he led the revolt in Gomel.

In 1918 Kaganovich acted as Commissar of the propaganda department of the Red Army. From May 1918 to August 1919 he was the Chairman of the Ispolkom (Committee) of the Nizhny Novgorod Governorate. In 1919–1920, he served as governor of the Voronezh Governorate. The years 1920 to 1922 he spent in Turkmenistan as one of the leaders of the Bolshevik struggle against local Muslim rebels (basmachi), and also commanding the succeeding punitive expeditions against local opposition.

=== Communist functionary ===
In June 1922, two months after Stalin became the General Secretary of the Communist Party, Kaganovich was appointed head of the party's Organisation and Instruction Department (Orgotdel), which was expanded a year later by absorbing the Records and Assignment Department, and renamed the Organisation-Assignment Department (Orgraspred). This department was responsible for all assignments within the apparatus of the Communist Party. Working there, Kaganovich helped to place Stalin's supporters in important jobs within the Communist Party bureaucracy. In this position he became noted for his great work capacity and for his personal loyalty to Stalin. He stated publicly that he would execute absolutely any order from Stalin, which at that time was a novelty.

In May 1924, Kaganovich became a full member of the Central Committee, after having first been elected as a candidate one year earlier, a member of the Orgburo, and a Secretary of the Central Committee.

From 1925 to 1928, Kaganovich was the First Secretary of the Communist Party of the Ukrainian SSR. In July 1926, he was also elected a candidate member of the Politburo of the Communist Party of the Soviet Union. He was given the task of "ukrainizatsiya" – meaning at that time the building up of Ukrainian communist popular cadres, and encouraging 'low' Ukrainian culture, by removing bureaucratic obstacles to the use of the Ukrainian language; but he treated high culture with great suspicion. He was particularly suspicious of the poet, Mykola Khvylovy, and sent Stalin a selection of quotations from Khvylovy's verses, which incited Stalin to launch an attack on the poet. He clashed frequently with the two most prominent ethnic Ukrainian Bolsheviks Vlas Chubar and Alexander Shumsky. Shumsky obtained an audience with Stalin in 1926 to insist that Kaganovich be recalled, but Kaganovich succeeded in getting Shumsky dismissed the following year, over his support for Khvylovy. Later, Stalin had a similar visit from Chubar, and the Ukraine President, Grigory Petrovsky.

In Moscow, he returned to his position as a Secretary of the Central Committee of the Communist Party, a job he held until 1939. As Secretary, he endorsed Stalin's struggle against the so-called Left and Right oppositions within the Communist Party, and backed Stalin's decision to enforce rapid collectivisation of agriculture, against the more moderate policy of Nikolai Bukharin, who argued in favor of the "peaceful integration of kulaks into socialism." In summer 1930, he was warned that Lenin's widow, Nadezhda Krupskaya had delivered a speech at a district party branch in Moscow, in which she criticised collectivisation. Kaganovich rushed to the meeting, and subjected Krupskaya to "coarse and scathing abuse."

In July 1930, Kaganovich was promoted to full membership of the Politburo, which he retained for 27 years.

=== Stalin's deputy ===
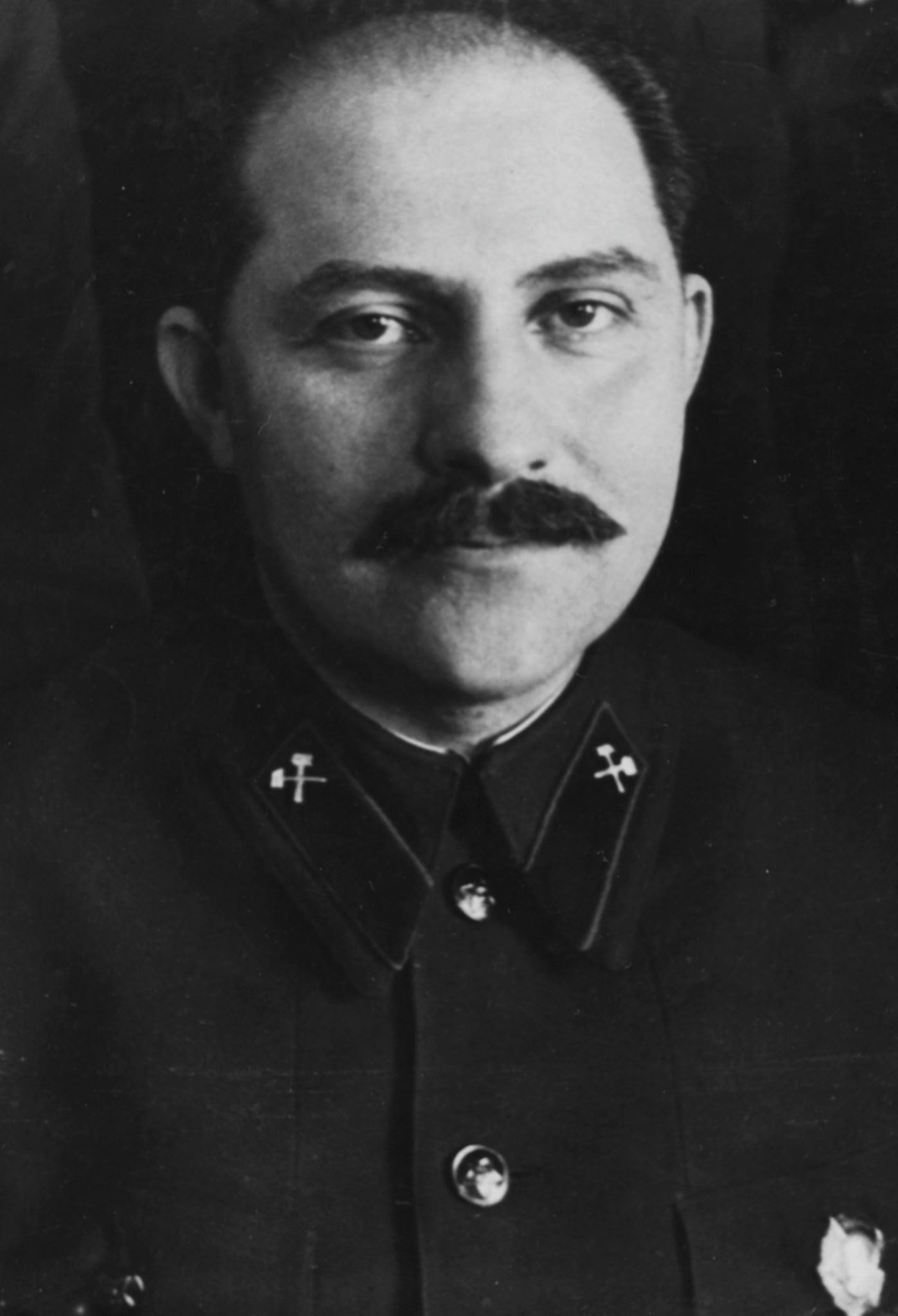
Kaganovich in the 1930s

In December 1930, when Vyacheslav Molotov was promoted to the post of chairman of the Soviet government, Kaganovich replaced him as Second Secretary, the post of Stalin's deputy in the party secretariat. In these four years, he was the third most powerful figure in the Soviet leadership, behind Stalin and Molotov. He was left in Moscow in charge of party affairs when Stalin was on vacation. In 2001, a collection of 836 letters and telegrams that Stalin and Kaganovich exchanged in 1931–36 were published in Russia. The bulk of them were translated and published in the US in 2003.

In 1933 and 1934, he served as the Chairman of the Commission for Vetting of the Party Membership (Tsentralnaya komissiya po proverke partiynykh ryadov) and ensured personally that nobody associated with anti-Stalin opposition would be permitted to remain a Communist Party member. In 1934, at the XVII Congress of the Communist Party, Kaganovich chaired the Counting Committee. He falsified voting for positions in the Central Committee, deleting 290 votes opposing the Stalin candidacy. His actions resulted in Stalin's being re-elected as the General Secretary instead of Sergey Kirov. By the rules, the candidate receiving fewer opposing votes should become the General Secretary. Before Kaganovich's falsification, Stalin received 292 opposing votes and Kirov only three. However, the "official" result (due to the interference of Kaganovich) saw Stalin with just two opposing votes.

In 1930–35, he was also First Secretary of the Moscow Obkom of the Communist Party (1930–1935). He later headed the Moscow Gorkom of the Communist Party (1931–1934). During this period, he also supervised destruction of many of the city's oldest monuments, including the Cathedral of Christ the Saviour. In 1932, he led the suppression of the workers' strike in Ivanovo-Voznesensk.

=== Moscow Metro ===
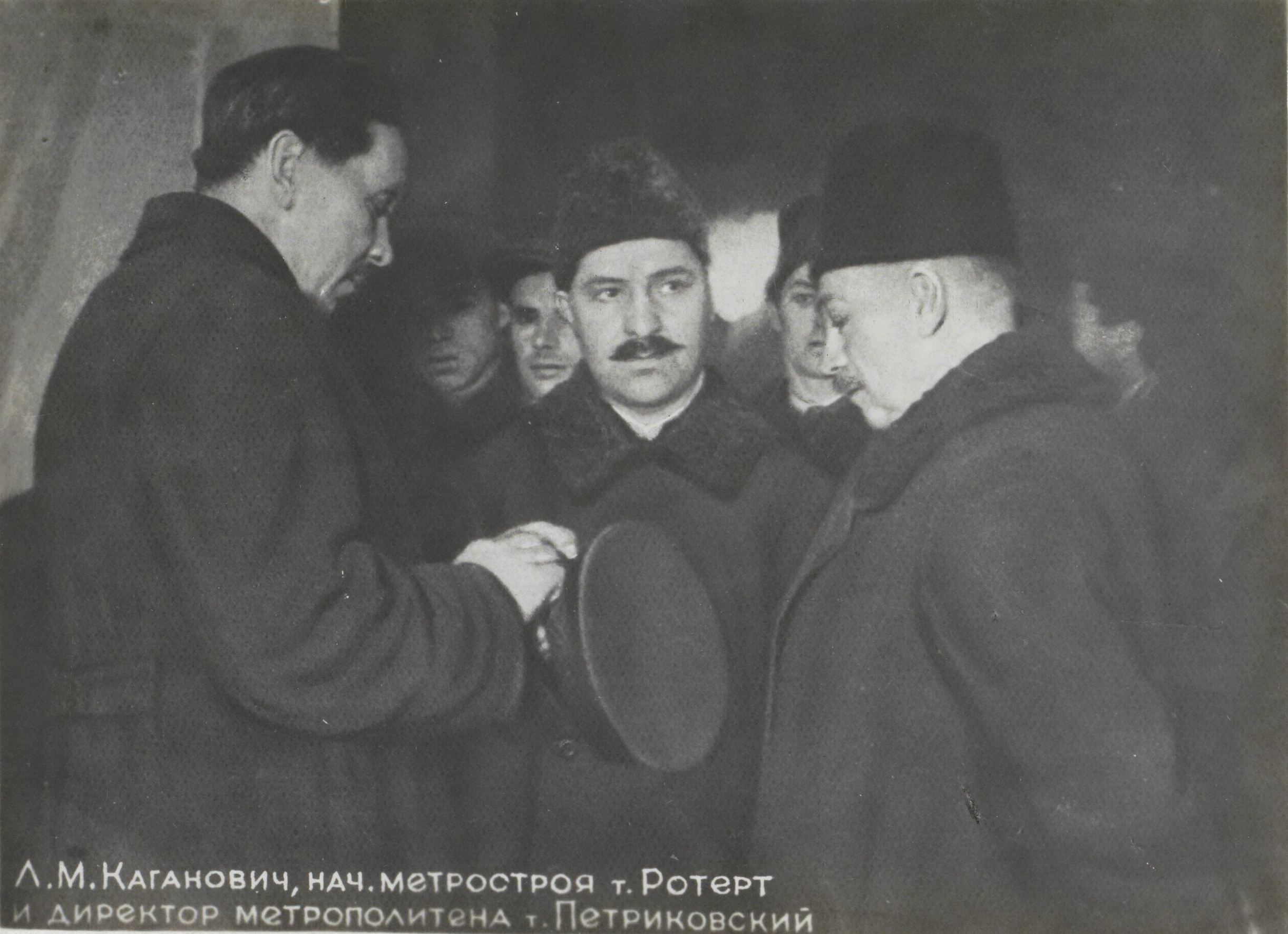
Kaganovich conferring with engineers during the construction of the metro

In the 1930s, Kaganovich – along with project managers Ivan Kuznetsov and, later Isaac Segal – organized and led the building of the first Soviet underground rapid-transport system, the Moscow Metro, known as Metropoliten imeni L.M. Kaganovicha after him until 1955. The decision to construct the metro was made at a plenum of the Central Committee on June 15, 1931, after a report by Kaganovich.

On October 15, 1941, L. M. Kaganovich received an order to close the Moscow Metro, and within three hours to prepare proposals for its destruction, as a strategically important object. The metro was supposed to be destroyed, and the remaining cars and equipment removed. On the morning of October 16, 1941, on the day of the panic in Moscow, the metro was not opened for the first time. It was the only day in the history of the Moscow metro when it did not work. By evening, the order to destroy the metro was cancelled.

In 1955, after the death of Stalin, the Moscow Metro was renamed to no longer include Kaganovich's name.

=== Culpability for the 1932–1933 famine ===
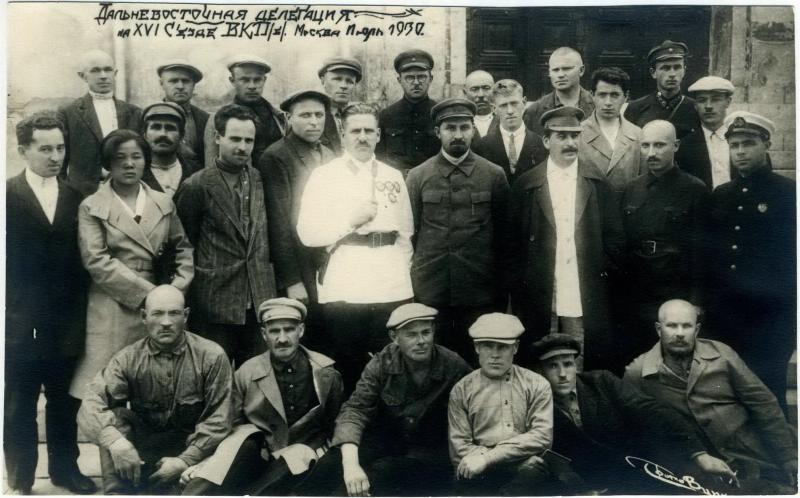
Vasily Blyukher, Lazar Kaganovich and Stalin on the 16th Congress of the All-Union Communist Party (Bolsheviks). July 1930

In July 1932, Molotov and Kaganovich travelled to Kharkov, then the capital of Ukraine, to order the Politburo of the Ukrainian Communist party to set a quote of grain procurement of 356 million pood a year. Every member of the Ukrainian Poliburo pleaded for a reduction in the quantity of grain peasants were required to hand over to the state, but Kaganovich and Molotov "categorically refused". Later the same month, they sent the Ukrainian party leaders a secret telegram ordering them to intensify grain production and impose harsh penalties on peasants who failed to comply. In August, Stalin and Kaganovich pushed through a decree that made theft or sabotage of state property, including the property of collective farms, punishable by death, and Kaganovich sent a telegram to the Ukrainian leaders on "the unsatisfactory pace of grain procurement." On 13 January 2010, years later, when the Kyiv Court of Appeal had investigated the causes of the 1932–33 famine, known as the Holodomor, the court cited these four incidents as proof that Kaganovich was complicit in an act of genocide against the Ukrainian nation. Though he and others were pronounced guilty as criminals, the case was ended immediately according to paragraph 8 of Article 6 of the Criminal Procedural Code of Ukraine. The court's ruling also referred to Kaganovich's return visit to Kharkiv in December 1932, when, during a Politburo session that lasted until 4.00 am, Ukrainians present begged that peasants should be allowed to retain more grain for their own consumption and seeds for the next year's crop, but Kaganovich overruled them and messaged Stalin accusing them of "seriously hampering and undermining the entire grain procurement."

Kaganovich also travelled to the Northern Caucasus in October 1932 to "struggle with the class enemy who sabotaged the grain collection and sowing." Meeting resistance from Cossacks, he had the entire population of 16 Cossack villages, of more than 1,000 people each, deported, and brought in peasants from less fertile land to replace them.

Kaganovich also travelled to the central regions of the USSR, and Siberia demanding the acceleration of collectivisation and repressions against the Kulaks, who were generally blamed for the slow progress of collectivization.

=== Repression of Poltavskaya ===
Poltavskaya sabotaged and resisted collectivisation period of the Soviet Union more than any other area in the Kuban, which was perceived by Lazar Kaganovich to be connected to a Ukrainian nationalist and Cossack conspiracy. Kaganovich relentlessly pursued the policy of requisition of grain in Poltavskaya and the rest of the Kuban and personally oversaw the purging of local leaders and Cossacks. Kaganovich viewed the resistance of Poltavskaya through Ukrainian lens delivering oration in a mixed Ukrainian language. To justify this Kaganovich cited a letter allegedly written by a stanitsa ataman (local Cossack leader) named Grigorii Omel'chenko advocating Cossack separatism and local reports of resistance to collectivisation in association with this figure to substantiate this suspicion of the area. However Kaganocvich did not reveal in speeches throughout the region that many of those targeted by persecution in Poltavskaya had their family members and friends deported or shot including in years before the supposed Omel'chenko crisis even started. Ultimately due to being perceived as the most rebellious area almost all (or 12,000) members of the Poltavskaya stanitsa were deported to the north. This coincided with and was a part of a wider deportation of 46,000 Cossacks from Kuban. At the same time, Poltavskaya was renamed Krasnoarmeyskaya (Красноарме́йская).

=== "Iron Lazar" ===
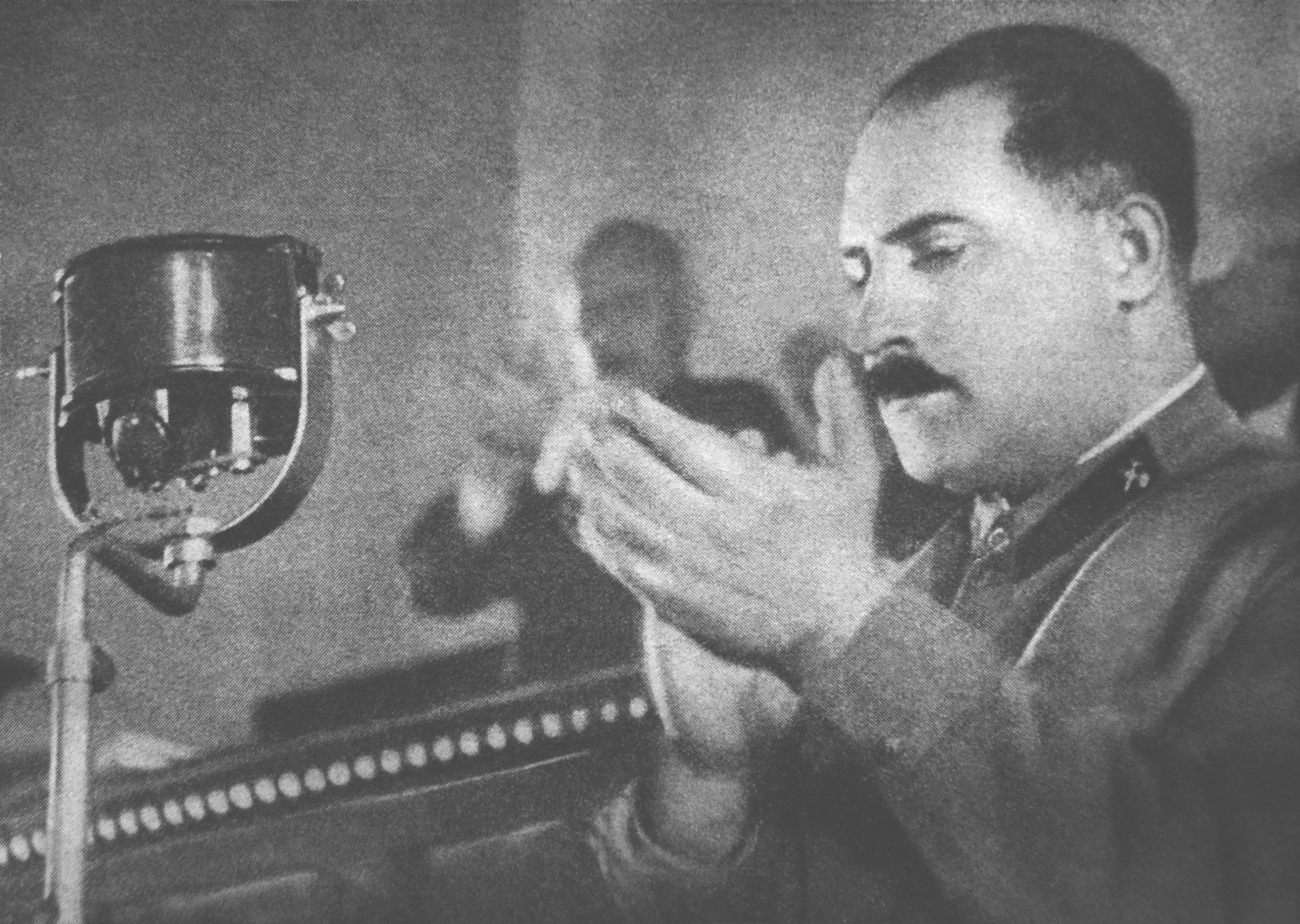
Lazar Kaganovich as People's Commissar for Transport in 1936

In spring 1935, Kaganovich was replaced as the secretary in charge of party organisation, and as chairman of the purge commission, by Nikolai Yezhov, the future head of the NKVD, whose rise was a harbinger of the Great Purge. Kaganovich had handpicked Yezhov in 1933 to be deputy head of the purge commission, significantly boosting his career. In March 1935, Kaganovich was replaced as first secretary of the Moscow party organisation, by Nikita Khrushchev.

From February 1935 to 1937, Kaganovich was Narkom (Minister) for the railways. This was the first step in his eventual switch from party to economic work, but in 1935, he played a significant role in preparations for the Great Purge. Even before it started, he organised the arrests of thousands of railway administrators and managers accused of sabotage.. Before the opening of the first of the Moscow show trials in August 1936, Kaganovich and Yezhov jointly reported to Stalin, who was on vacation, about progress in forcing the defendants to confess. He was also in Moscow to facilitate Yezhov's appointment as head of the NKVD, after Stalin had demanded the removal of the incumbent, Genrikh Yagoda, which Kaganovich praised as a "remarkable and wise decision of our father."

During the Great Purge, Kaganovich was sent from Moscow to Ivanovo, the Kuban, Smolensk and elsewhere, to instigate removals and arrests. In Ivanovo, he ordered the arrests of the provincial party secretary, and the head of the propaganda department, and accused a majority of the executive of being "enemies of the people". His visit became known as the "black tornado".

In all Party conferences of the later 1930s, he made speeches demanding increased efforts in the search for and prosecution of "foreign spies" and "saboteurs." For his ruthlessness in the execution of Stalin's orders, he was nicknamed "Iron Lazar." During his time serving as Railways Commissar, Kaganovich participated in the murder of 36,000 people by signing death lists. Kaganovich had exterminated so many railwaymen that one official called to warn that one line was entirely unmanned. In 1936–39, Kaganovich's signature appears on 188 out of 357 documented execution lists.

External videos
- Examples of Kaganovich's speeches
- 1
- 2

Kaganovich was appointed People's Commissar for Heavy Industry after his predecessor, Sergo Ordzhonikidze committed suicide, in February 1937. In August 1938, he was named as a Deputy Chairman of the Council of People's Commissars. In 1939, he was appointed People's Commissar for the Oil Industry. During World War II (known as the Great Patriotic War in the USSR), Kaganovich was Commissar (Member of the Military Council) of the North Caucasian and Transcaucasian Fronts. During 1943–1944, he was again the Narkom for the railways. In 1943, he was presented with the title of Hero of Socialist Labour. From 1944 to 1947, Kaganovich was the Minister for Building Materials.

Kaganovich's NKPS (People's Commissariat of Communication Routes of the Soviet Union) was largely responsible for organising the deportation of the Volga Germans in 1941. Even though the forcible transfer of populations was determined to be a crime against humanity at the Nuremberg trials, Kaganovich never faced trial for his actions.

=== Political decline ===
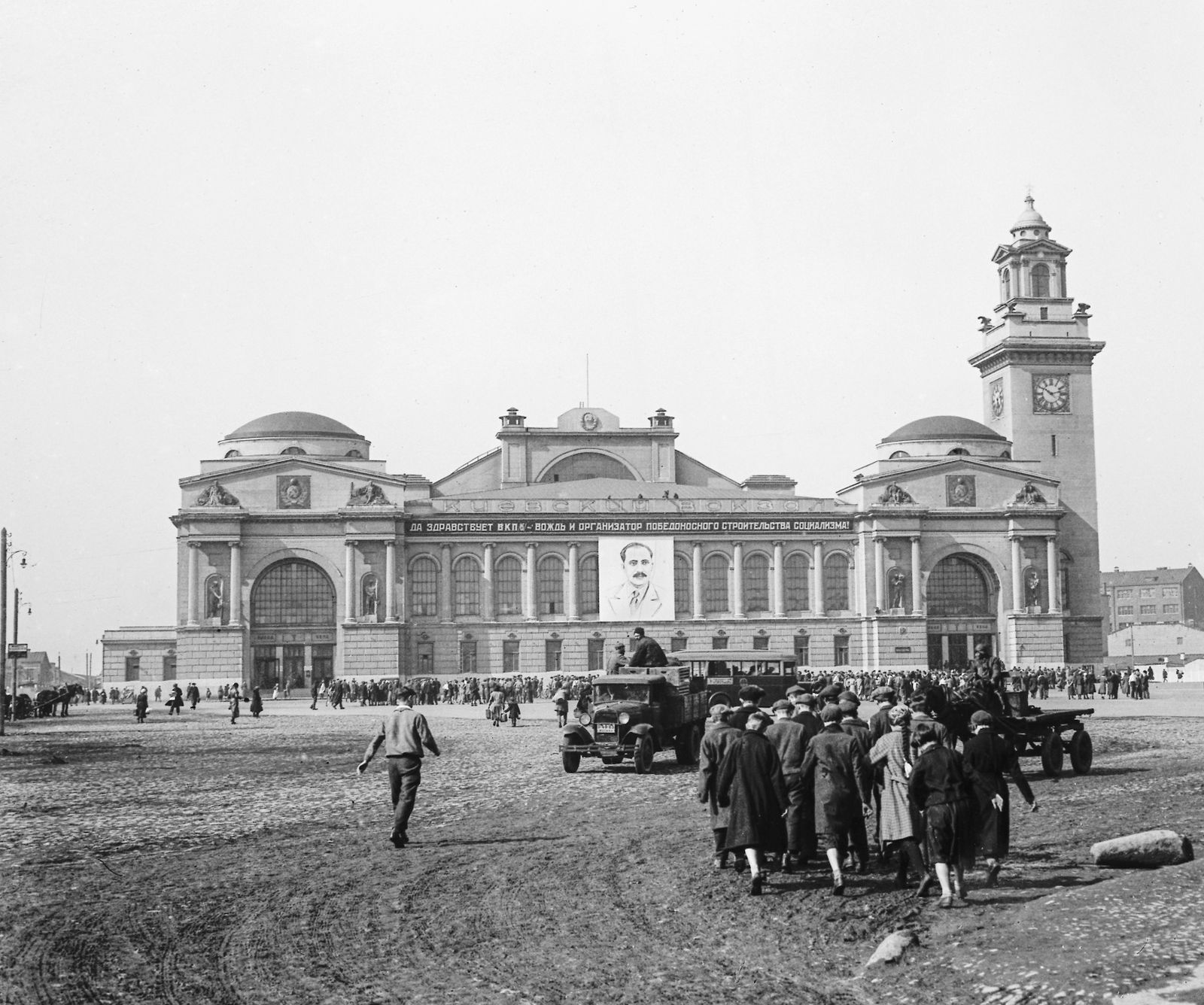
Portrait of Kaganovich on Kiev train station

Politically, Kaganovich was a much diminished figure after the war. An early sign of his weakened position was that in 1941, his brother, Mikhail, committed suicide when facing arrest, just after the German invasion. Lazar Kaganovich reputedly made no attempt to help him. When the State Defence Committee was formed to direct the war, Kaganovich was initially excluded, though he was co-opted in February 1942. In 1946, he was officially ranked ninth in seniority in the Kremlin pecking order.

In 1947, after Ukraine had failed to deliver its grain quota in the wake of a drought, Kaganovich was sent to replace Khrushchev as First Secretary of the Ukrainian CP, while Khrushchev was downgraded to the post of head of government. However, Kaganovich was recalled and Khrushchev reinstated in December 1947.

From 1949, until Stalin's death in March 1953, Kaganovich was in a precarious situation because of the state-sponsored anti-semitism, culminating in the Slánský trial in Prague, and the Doctors' plot, during which hundreds of Jews, including Molotov's wife, Polina Zhemchuzhina, were arrested, and many were tortured and shot. Kaganovich remained in office throughout, as the most prominent Jew in the Soviet leadership, but was no longer invited to meet Stalin socially, and "was lying low, watching the course of events in fear and trembling".

From 1948 to 1952, he was the Chairman of Gossnab (State Committee for Material-Technical Supply, charged with the primary responsibility for the allocation of producer goods to enterprises, a critical state function in the absence of markets).

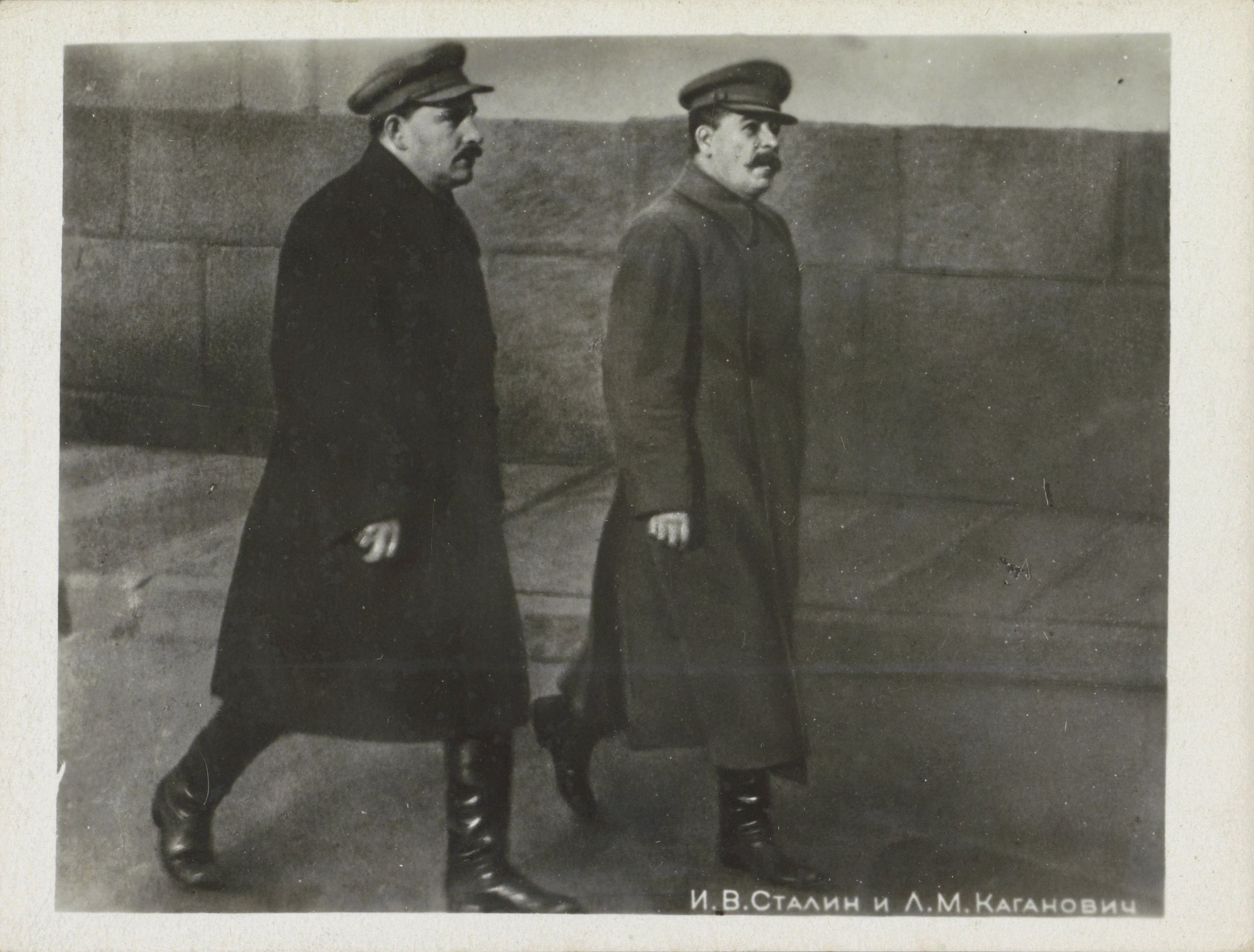
Joseph Stalin and Lazar Kaganovich 1930s

After Stalin's death, Kaganovich appeared to regain some of the influence he had lost. In March 1953, he was appointed one of four First Vice-Premiers of the Council of Ministers, and confirmed as a full member of the ten-man Praesidium (the new name given to the Politburo), and on 24 May 1955, he was appointed the first Chairman of Goskomtrud.

But his position rapidly deteriorated with the rise of Nikita Khrushchev. In the 1930s, he had been Khrushchev's mentor, but Khrushchev had not forgiven the interlude when Kaganovich supplanted him as the Ukrainian party leader in 1947, and had come to despise him. In his memoirs, Khrushchev wrote:

His behaviour disgusted me, and it disgusted others. He was nothing but a lackey ... Stalin used to hold him up as an example of a man "resolute in his class consciousness" and "implacable towards his class enemies." Later we found out all too well how resolute and implacable Kaganovich really was. He was the kind of man who wouldn't say a single word on behalf of his own brother, Mikhail Kaganovich.

In 1956–57, Kaganovich joined Molotov, Georgy Malenkov, and Dmitri Shepilov in an attempt to remove Khrushchev from office, partly in reaction against Khrushchev's Secret Speech in February 1956, denouncing Stalin and the persecution of innocent party officials. On 6 June 1956, Kaganovich was removed from the chairmanship of the State Committee on Labour and Wages. When the Central Committee convened to resolve this dispute, in June 1957, Kaganovich was accused of "inactivity and crude violations of revolutionary legality" in his management of the state committees he chaired, and was expelled from the Praesidium, with the other three members of what was now officially called the Anti-Party Group'. He was reportedly terrified that he would be arrested and shot, and phoned Khrushchev to beg for clemency. He was given the job of director of Uralasbest.

=== Retirement ===
In 1961, Kaganovich was expelled from the Party and became a pensioner living in Moscow. His grandchildren reported that after his dismissal from the Central Committee, Kaganovich (who had a reputation for his temperamental and allegedly violent nature) never shouted again and became a devoted grandfather.

In 1984, his re-admission to the Party was considered by the Politburo, alongside that of Molotov. During the last years of life he played dominoes with fellow pensioners and criticized Soviet media attacks on Stalin: "First, Stalin is disowned, now, little by little, it gets to prosecute socialism, the October Revolution, and in no time they will also want to prosecute Lenin and Marx." Shortly before death he suffered a heart attack.

In 1991 Kaganovich was interviewed about the alleged murder of Lenin's widow, in which he suggested Lavrentiy Beria may have been involved with Krupskaya's poisoning and was quoted in 1991 saying "I can't dismiss that possibility. He might have." Russian writer Arkady Vaksberg further commented that the fact Kaganovich had confirmed the poisoning "did actually take place is more important than specifying who ordered it."

=== Death ===
Kaganovich died on 25 July 1991, at the age of 97, just before the events that resulted in the end of the USSR, a state he had played an active role in creating. According to Edvard Radzinsky, quoting one of Kaganovich's distant relatives, at that moment a news report featuring Gorbachev and Yeltsin was being broadcast on television, and the housekeeper allegedly heard Kaganovich's final words: "This is a catastrophe". He is buried at the Novodevichy Cemetery in Moscow.

== "Rosa Kaganovich" episode ==
In 1987, American journalist Stuart Kahan published a book entitled The Wolf of the Kremlin: The First Biography of L.M. Kaganovich, the Soviet Union's Architect of Fear (William Morrow & Co). In the book, Kahan claimed to be Kaganovich's long-lost nephew, and claimed to have interviewed Kaganovich personally and stated that Kaganovich admitted to being partially responsible for the death of Stalin in 1953 (supposedly by poisoning). A number of other unusual claims were made as well, including that Stalin was married to a sister of Kaganovich (supposedly named "Rosa") during the last year of his life and that Kaganovich (who was raised Jewish) was the architect of anti-Jewish pogroms.

The rumor that Stalin married a sister of Kaganovich after the death of Nadezhda Alliluyeva in 1932 seems to have originated in the 1930s. Elizabeth Lermolo, who emigrated to the US in 1950 and published a memoir, Face of a Victim reported hearing the story while she was a prisoner in the gulag. The story has been repeated in sources including The Rise and Fall of Stalin, (1965) by Robert Payne, The Private Life of Josif Stalin (1962) by Jack Fishman and Bernard Hutton, and in Stalin: the History of a Dictator (1982) by Harford Montgomery Hyde. There were also frequent mentions of 'Rosa Kaganovich' in western media including The New York Times, Time and Life. The story of Rosa Kaganovich was mentioned by Trotsky, who alleged that "Stalin married the sister of Kaganovich, thereby presenting the latter with hopes for a promising future."

After The Wolf of the Kremlin was translated into Russian by Progress Publishers, and a chapter from it printed in the Nedelya (Week) newspaper in 1991, remaining members of Kaganovich's family composed the Statement of the Kaganovich Family in response. The statement disputed all of Kahan's claims. The family denied that Kaganovich ever had a sister called Rosa, though he had a niece of that name, who was 13 years old in the year when Stalin's second wife committed suicide. Stalin's daughter, Svetlana Alliluyeva was equally emphatic, writing in a memoir published in 1969:

Nothing could be more unlikely than the story spread in the West about 'Stalin's third wife' – the mythical Rosa Kaganovich. Apart from the fact that I never saw any 'Rosa' in the Kaganovich family, the idea that this legendary Rosa, an intellectual woman ... and above all a Jewess, could have captured my father's fancy shows how totally ignorant people were of his true nature.

After the fall of Communism in 1991, it became possible for historians to search for evidence in the archives. There is no mention of 'Rosa Kaganovich' in the hundreds of published letters and telegrams found in the archives that Stalin and Kaganovich exchanged in the period when, supposedly, they were brothers-in-law. Simon Sebag Montefiore mentioned her in his detailed study of life in the Kremlin under Stalin, but only to say that "it seems this particular story is a myth." He added:

The significance of the story was that Stalin had a Jewish wife, useful propaganda for the Nazis who had an interest in merging the Jewish and Bolshevik devils into Mr and Mrs Stalin.

== Personal life ==
Kaganovich entered the workforce at the age of 13, an event which would shape his aesthetics and preferences through adulthood. Stalin himself confided to Kaganovich that the latter had a much greater fondness and appreciation for the proletariat. As his favorability with Stalin rose, Kaganovich felt compelled to rapidly fill the noticeable gaps in his education and upbringing. Stalin, upon noticing that Kaganovich could not use commas properly, gave Kaganovich three months' leave to undertake a rapid course in grammar.

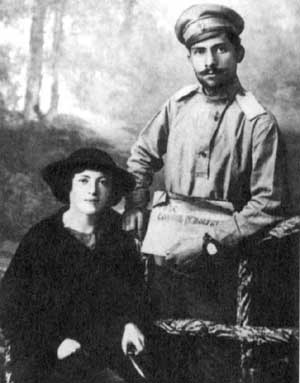
Kaganovich and his wife M. Privorotskaya during WW1

Kaganovich was married to Maria Markovna Kaganovich (née Privorotskaya) (1894–1961), a fellow assimilated Kievan Jew who was part of the revolutionary effort since 1909. Mrs Kaganovich spent many years as a powerful municipal official, directly ordering the demolition of the Iberian Gate and Chapel and Cathedral of Christ the Saviour. The couple had two children: a daughter, named Maya, and an adopted son, Yuri. Much attention has been devoted by historians to Kaganovich's Jewishness, and how it conflicted with Stalin's biases. Kaganovich frequently found it necessary to allow great cruelties to occur to his family to preserve Stalin's trust in him, such as allowing his brother to be coerced into suicide.

The Kaganovich family initially lived, as most high-level Soviet functionaries in the 1930s, a conservative lifestyle in modest conditions. This changed when Stalin entrusted the construction of the Moscow Metro to Kaganovich. The family moved into a luxurious apartment near ground zero (Sokolniki station), located at 3 Pesochniy Pereulok (Sandy Lane). Kaganovich's apartment consisted of two floors (an extreme rarity in the USSR), a private access garage, and a designated space for butlers, security, and drivers.

== Decorations and awards ==
- Order of Lenin, four times
- Order of the Red Banner of Labour (27 October 1938)
- Hero of Socialist Labour (5 November 1943)

== See also ==
- Outline of the Russian Revolution and Civil War
- Bibliography of the Russian Revolution and Civil War
- Bibliography of Stalinism and the Soviet Union
- Index of Old Bolsheviks
- Index of articles related to the Russian Revolution and Civil War

== Bibliography ==
- Colton, Timothy (1988). Hall, Wayne (ed.). "Moscow's Party Organization". Problems of Communism. XXXVII (January–February 1988): 30–59.
- Davies RW (2003). Khlevniuk O, Rees EA, Kosheleva LP, Rogovaya LA (eds.). The Stalin-Kaganovich Correspondence, 1931–36. Yale University Press.
- Radzinsky, Edvard, (1996) Stalin, Doubleday (English translation edition), 1996. ISBN 0-385-47954-9
- Rees, E.A. (2004). "Stalin as Leader 1924–1937: From Oligarch to Dictator". In Rees, E.A. (ed.). The Nature of Stalin's Dictatorship: The Politburo, 1924–1953. Palgrave MacMillan. pp. 19–58. ISBN 978-0-230-52428-6.
- Rees, E.A. Iron Lazar: A Political Biography of Lazar Kaganovich (Anthem Press; 2012) 373 pages; scholarly biography

Political offices
Preceded by Pavel Yudin position created	Minister of Building Materials Industry; 1956–1957; 1946–1947	Succeeded by Ivan Grishmanov; Semyon Ginzburg
Preceded by position created	Chairman of State Committee on Labor and Salary; 1955–1956	Succeeded by Aleksandr Volkov
Preceded by ?	First Deputy Chairman of the Council of Ministers; 1953–1957	Succeeded by ?
Preceded by position created	Chairman of State Committee on Materiel-Technical Supply for National Economy; 1948–1952	Succeeded by Ivan Kabanov
Preceded by Andrei Khrulyov; Aleksei Bakulin; Andrei Andreyev	People's Commissar of Commuting Routes; 1943–1944; 1938–1942; 1935–1937	Succeeded by Ivan Kovalyov; Andrei Khrulyov; Aleksei Bakulin
Preceded by ?	Chairman of Council on Evacuation; 1941–1941	Succeeded by ?
Preceded by position created	People's Commissar of Oil Industry; 1939–1940	Succeeded by Ivan Sedin
Preceded by position created	People's Commissar of Fuel Industry; 1939–1939	Succeeded by position liquidated
Preceded by Valeriy Mezhlauk	People's Commissar of Heavy Industry; 1937–1939	Succeeded by position liquidated
Party political offices
Preceded by Nikita Khrushchev; Emanuil Kviring	1st Secretary of the Communist Party of Ukraine; 1947–1947; 1925–1928	Succeeded by Nikita Khrushchev; Stanislav Kosior
Preceded by ?	1st Secretary of the Communist Party of Moscow City; 1931–1934	Succeeded by Nikita Khrushchev
Preceded by Karl Bauman	1st Secretary of the Communist Party of Moscow Oblast; 1930–1935	Succeeded by Nikita Khrushchev
