= Discovery Island Marine Provincial Park =

Provincial park in British Columbia, Canada

- IUCN category II (national park)
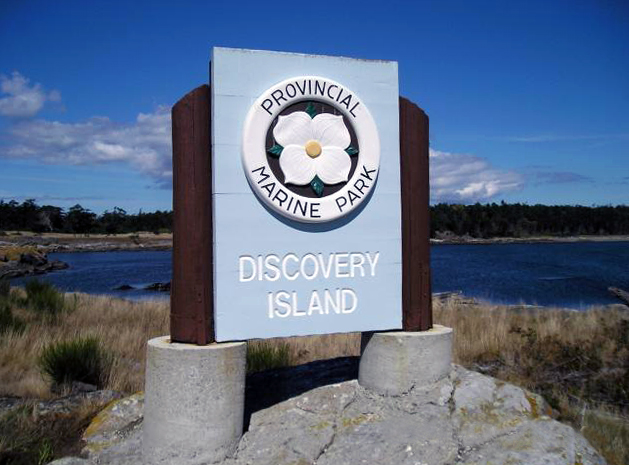

- Location within Vancouver Island Location within British Columbia
- Interactive map of Discovery Island Marine Provincial Park
- Location: British Columbia
- Coordinates: 48°25′29″N 123°14′15″W
- Established: 1972

Discovery Island Marine Provincial Park is a provincial park located about two nautical miles (2.3 mi; 3.7 km) east of Oak Bay on the coast of British Columbia, Canada. It is about one mile (1.6 km) long and one-half mile (0.80 km) wide and looks out into the Strait of Juan de Fuca.

== Accessibility ==
Discovery Island Marine Provincial Park is only accessible by boat and is popular with kayakers. The nearest marina and official anchorage is located in Oak Bay and the nearest launching ramp is located at Cattle Point. On the east side of the island, on Pandora Hill, there is a lighthouse which has been automated for the past several years. Pandora Hill is also one of the turning points for the Canada–United States border. The northern portion of Discovery Island is a First Nations reserve.

== Facilities ==
Camping is allowed in the area southwest of Pandora Hill. Campers can set up a tent (CA$5 per person per night). There is a pit toilet, and there are picnic tables, however, there is no drinking water on the island and it is a pack-in-pack-out campsite.

Rudlin Bay is the main access to the campground, which is filled with dangerous rocks, as well as being exposed to the southeast. It is possible for a small boat to temporarily anchor there, but there is no safe overnight anchorage. Campfires are not permitted.

== History ==
The provincial park on Discovery Island was first established in 1972. The park land had previously been owned by Captain E.G. Beaumont, who had purchased the land in 1918 and had left it to the province of British Columbia in his will.

Prior to 1918, the land had passed through the hands of several owners. It was purchased from the Crown in 1867 by George Jay and James Chestney Bales. In 1871, the partnership between Jay and Bales dissolved, and Bales took possession of the land. In 1901, Bales sold the land to William James Palmer, who then sold the land to Warburton Pike in 1912. After Pike's death in 1917, the property was taken over by Pike's bank and subsequently sold to Captain Beaumont.

== Images ==
The map on display at the campground

The view from the campground

== See also ==
- Discovery Island
- Discovery Island Lighthouse
- Captain E.G. Beaumont
