= Dibrova, Vyshhorod Raion, Kyiv Oblast =

Rural locality in Kyiv Oblasyt, Ukraine

Dibrova Діброва
- Location of Dibrova Dibrova (Ukraine)
- Coordinates: 51°17′03″N 29°40′47″E
- Country: Ukraine
- Oblast: Kyiv Oblast
- Raion: Poliske Raion (until 2020); Vyshhorod Raion (2020–present); Chernobyl Exclusion Zone (de facto) (1986–present)

Population (2001)
  - Total: 0

Dibrova (Ukrainian: Діброва), formerly known as Kabany, Kaganovichi, and Kaganovichi Drugi, is an abandoned settlement and former village in the Chernobyl Exclusion Zone, part of Kyiv Oblast, Ukraine. It was resettled due to the Chernobyl disaster and deregistered in 1999.

== History ==
After the nuclear disaster of 26 April 1986, Dibrova was abandoned and in 1999, it was taken out of a registry as it was completely depopulated being located in the Zone of Alienation.

Dibrova was previously located in Poliske Raion until was abolished on 18 July 2020 as part of the administrative reform of Ukraine, which reduced the number of raions of Kyiv Oblast to seven. The area of Poliske Raion was merged into Vyshhorod Raion.

From February to April 2022, Dibrova was occupied by Russian forces as a result of the Russian invasion of Ukraine.

== Notable people ==
- Lazar Kaganovich (1893 – 1991), politician

== See also ==
- Chernobyl Nuclear Power Plant
