= Takaya (wolf) =

Lone wolf who lived on islands in British Columbia and killed by a hunter in 2020

- Species: Wolf
- Sex: Male
- Cause of death: Gunshot wound
- Known for: Lone wolf lifestyle
- Residence: Discovery Island

Takaya (c. 2010 – March 24, 2020) was a lone wolf who lived on a small group of islands in British Columbia, Canada for eight years. His life was documented by conservation photographer Cheryl Alexander in the 2019 documentary film Takaya: Lone Wolf, and in the book of the same name, which was released in September 2020.

In March 2020, Takaya was shot and killed by a hunter. This sparked outrage among Takaya's local and international following, and has prompted calls for changes to the laws that permit the recreational killing of wolves in B.C. without a special license.

== Life ==
In 2012, when Takaya was two years old, he left his pack behind and traveled over 40 kilometres (25 mi) through urban and suburban areas. He then swam almost 3.2 kilometres (2 mi) through strong currents to reach a small archipelago located off the southeastern tip of Vancouver Island which is accessible by boat or kayak from the nearby city of Victoria. The archipelago includes Discovery Island and Chatham Islands. The Chatham Islands and the northern part of Discovery Island are Indigenous reserve land, under the stewardship of the Songhees First Nation, while the southern part of Discovery Island is a provincial park.

When Takaya was first spotted on the islands, officials closed the provincial park. Conservation officers attempted to trap the wolf, speculating that if he remained on the island, he would become too comfortable around people. However, Takaya avoided the traps that were set out for him, and after the Songhees Band Council passed a motion stating that the wolf should be allowed to remain free, the conservation service decided to leave him alone.

=== Living in the islands ===
Takaya proceeded to live by himself in the islands for the next eight years. During this time, Alexander began to study Takaya seriously. She traveled out to the islands regularly, with special permission from the Songhees, to photograph the wolf and observe his behaviour. She set up trail cameras around his territory and recorded over one thousand hours of video footage.

Takaya developed skills such as catching and skinning seals, hunting for prickleback fish, and stealing eggs from the nests of Canada geese. He also learned how to dig for fresh water during periods of drought, surprising biologists like Chris Darimont, who stated that Takaya pushed the boundaries of what scientists believed to be ecologically possible.

=== Encounter with campers ===
Takaya's ability to coexist with human visitors to the islands was called into question in September 2016, when a group of campers reported that they and their dogs had been "cornered" by the wolf. Conservation officers closed the park for several months in order to assess whether the wolf posed a risk to humans. In an interview with a local radio host, Alexander said that she had never observed any signs of aggression from Takaya. She expressed disappointment that the campers had not come forward to provide a clear description of the wolf's behaviour, as it "most likely wasn't aggressive."

Alexander worried that the campers had imperiled Takaya's future on the islands by creating the perception that he was a danger to humans. However, in May 2017, officials confirmed that Takaya had merely been showing signs of curiosity, not aggression. The provincial government reopened the park for day use only and reiterated that dogs and other pets were not permitted on the island.

=== Leaving the islands ===
Takaya continued to live and hunt on the islands until January 2020, when he suddenly departed for reasons unknown. Alexander suggested that he may have been swept ashore while swimming between islands. Alternatively, he may have left the island to search for a mate. He was next seen walking down the sidewalk in the neighbourhood of James Bay in Victoria, where he was tranquilized by conservation officers and relocated to an undisclosed wilderness location on the west coast of Vancouver Island.

A month later, at the end of February 2020, Alexander received a message from a woman who believed that she had spotted Takaya near the urban area of Port Renfrew. Later, she received a photograph of a wolf from a farmer who lived in the same area. She confirmed that the wolf was Takaya and began to worry that he would be in danger now that he had ventured back into an urban area.

On March 24, 2020, Takaya was shot and killed by a hunter near Shawnigan Lake, about 50 kilometres away from where he was originally released.

== Legacy ==
=== Artistic tributes ===
Takaya's story was featured in the documentary Takaya: Lone Wolf on CBC, BBC, or ARTE. Following the release of this documentary, artwork in honour of Takaya was created and sent to Alexander, often including personal messages about what Takaya's story meant to them. An international collection of artwork was showcased in the Takaya Lone Wolf International Arts Festival in Victoria on October 24, 2020.

==== Mural ====
Takaya has also been the subject of several large-scale public art installations in Victoria.

After Takaya's death, local mural artist Paul Archer and a group of his friends travelled out to Discovery Island to create a memorial for Takaya. They painted a larger-than-life portrait of the wolf on the wall of an old foghorn building, an area where Takaya used to sit when he was alive. The mural was approved by Rob Sam, the Chief of the Songhees Nation, who thanked Archer and his team for their tribute to Takaya.

==== Driftwood sculpture ====
Artist Tanya Bub created a 1.5-metre (5 ft)-tall, 68-kilogram (150 lb) sculpture of Takaya using over 1000 pieces of driftwood, shells, and kelp that she and Alexander had collected from the shores of Discovery Island. This sculpture was displayed in the lobby of the historic Empress Hotel in downtown Victoria.

==== Marble sculpture ====
In 2020, an anonymous donor commissioned a sculpture of Takaya to be carved by artist Kent Laforme from a 11,000-kilogram (25,000 lb) block of island marble. Although this sculpture has not yet been committed to a particular location, there is a possibility that it could be located in at Cattle Point in Oak Bay, overlooking the islands where Takaya once lived.

The sculpture features a cylindrical hole, which acts as a lookout point and an acoustic sound tunnel through which visitors could howl in honour of Takaya.

On October 5, 2023, at just after 10 am, the Takaya stone was unveiled at Cattle point, by members of the Songhees nation and artist Kent Laforme. A small gathering of public and members of the Songhees nation commemorated this event with drummers.

=== Political campaigns ===
After Takaya's death, two local non-profit organizations began to use his story in campaigns to stop the recreational killing of wolves in British Columbia. Pacific Wild invited supporters to "Take Action for Takaya" by signing their Save B.C. Wolves petition, which as of April 2020 had been signed by more than 500,000 people. Alexander founded Takaya's Legacy, an organization to support wolf conservation, and successfully protested the use of a photograph she took of Takaya by a company promoting wolf hunting in British Columbia.

=== Educational impact ===
Takaya's story has been used by educators to develop programs about wolves and their roles in Earth's ecosystems. Takaya inspired LiveIt, an online educational company, to create an educational initiative about wolves for children in Grades 2–6.
