= Ernest Beaumont =

Captain Ernest Godfrey Beaumont (1876–1967) was a long-term resident of Discovery Island, British Columbia, Canada, who was sometimes called the "King of the Island". In 1918, Beaumont bought 160 acres (0.65 km^{2}) of land on the island. He and his wife built a house designed by Francis Rattenbury, who designed the Parliament Buildings in Victoria, near the centre of the island. He had a 40-foot (12 m) yacht named the Discovery Isle which he had had built in Hong Kong in 1925, and which he would use to go to and from the island. Beaumont used to say "I know where all the rocks are". "I bumped into all of them and once in a while I bump into them again to remind myself of their presence". The Discovery Isle met its end on December 5, 1950, when it struck a rock in Enterprise Channel. Beaumont had to abandon ship and barely managed to make it ashore.

Beaumont enjoyed inviting scouts, cadets, and other children to the island. He claimed to have hosted 20,000 over his lifetime on the island. He kept fit into his 90s and used to row around Discovery Island and the Chatham Islands, as well as to the Royal Victoria Yacht Club.

In 1967, after spending 50 years on the island, Captain Beaumont died at the age of 91. In his will, he gave his part of the island to the Province of British Columbia to be used as a park. There are two plaques on the island, one from the Scouts and one from the Province of British Columbia, thanking him for his gift. The plaques are located on the west side of Rudlin Bay.

On July 27, 1972, the southern part of Discovery Island was established as the Discovery Island Marine Provincial Park.

Beaumont also donated Beaumont Marine Park on South Pender Island and Beaumont Provincial Park in the Nechako Plateau.

== Archived records ==
The Maritime Museum of British Columbia holds logbooks of the motor yacht "Discovery Isle" and other records (16 volumes) written by Captain Beaumont from 1926 to 1962, and a photograph of the yacht.

The provincial archives of British Columbia holds a diary of Beaumont and 29 photographs from 1939.

== See also ==
- Discovery Island (British Columbia)
- Discovery Island Marine Provincial Park
- Discovery Island Lighthouse
