= Sidney Bradshaw Fay =

American historian (1876–1967)

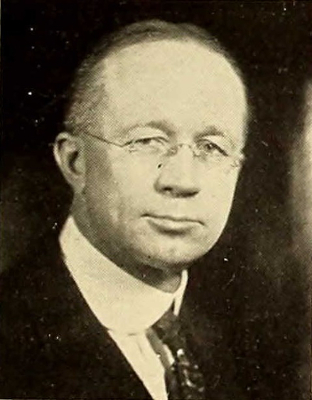
- Sidney Bradshaw Fay, circa 1922

Sidney Bradshaw Fay (April 13, 1876, in Washington, D.C. – August 29, 1967, in Lexington, Massachusetts) was an American historian whose examination of the causes of World War I, The Origins of the World War (1928; revised edition 1930), remains a classic study. In this book, which won him the 1928 George Louis Beer Prize of the American Historical Association, Fay argued that Germany was too readily blamed for the war and that a great deal of the responsibility instead rested with the Allies, especially Russia and Serbia. His stance is supported by several modern scholars, such as Christopher Clark, but it remains controversial.

Fay left Harvard University (Ph.D. 1900) to study at the Sorbonne and the University of Berlin. He taught at Dartmouth College (1902–14) and Smith College (1914–29) and, after the publication of his major book, at Harvard (including Radcliffe) and Yale University.

Fay's conclusion was that all the European powers shared in the blame, but he blamed mostly the system of secret alliances that divided Europe after the Franco-Prussian War into two mutually suspicious camps of group solidarity: Triple Alliance against Triple Entente (Fay's student Allan B. Calhamer, would later develop and publish the game Diplomacy, based on this thesis). He considered Austro-Hungary, Serbia and Russia to be primarily responsible for the immediate cause of war's outbreak. Other forces besides militarism and nationalism were at work, as the economics of imperialism and the newspaper press played roles.

Fay was elected to the American Academy of Arts and Sciences in 1931 and the American Philosophical Society in 1947.

Fay also wrote The Rise of Brandenburg-Prussia to 1786 (1937).

He married (August 17, 1904) Sarah Eliza Proctor.

== Works ==
- Germany: Revised and Edited from the Work of Bayard Taylor, H. W. Snow, c. 1910 [P. F. Collier & Son Corporation, c. 1939, "Memorial edition"].
- The Hohenzollern Household and Administration in the Sixteenth Century, with John Spencer Bassett, Dept. of History of Smith College, 1916.
- The Origins of the World War, 2 Vols., The Macmillan Company, 1928 [2d ed., 1930]. online
- The Rise of Brandenburg-Prussia to 1786,, H. Holt and Company, c. 1937 [Reprint, Malabar, Fla.: R.E. Krieger Pub. Co., 1981].
- A Guide to Historical Literature,, edited by George Matthew Dutcher, Henry Robinson Shipman, Sidney Bradshaw Fay, Augustus Hunt Shearer, William Henry Allison, The Macmillan Company, 1937.

=== Other ===
- Eduard Fueter (1876–1928), World History, 1815–1920, Harcourt, Brace and Company, 1921, Zurich [translated by Sidney Fay, 1922].
- Friedrich Meinecke, The German Catastrophe, Harvard University Press, 1950 [translated by Sidney Fay].

=== Articles ===
- "The Roman Law and the German Peasant." American Historical Review, Vol. 16, No. 2, Jan. 1911.
- "New Light on the Origins of the World War, I. Berlin and Vienna, to July 29," American Historical Review, Vol. 25, No. 4, Jul. 1920.
- "Serajevo Fifteen Years After." The Living Age, July 1929.
- "June 28, 1914." In Eugene Lohrke, Armageddon, 1930.
- "Peace-Making: 1919, 1945." The Forum, November 1945.
- "Our Responsibility for German Universities." The Forum, January 1946.
- "The First U.N.O. Assembly." The Forum, April 1946.
- "The Power of the Soviet Press." The Forum, August 1947.
- "The Marshall Plan: Second Phase." The Forum, February 1948.
- "Germany's Social Structure." The Forum, October 1948.

== See also ==
- Causes of World War I
