= Ducher (surname) =

Ducher is a surname. Notable people with the name include:

- Émmanuel Ducher (1971–2013), French water polo player
- Jean Ducher, French weightlifter

== See also ==
- Joseph Pernet-Ducher (1859–1928), French rose breeder
- Dutcher, surname
