= Discovery Island Light =

Discovery Island Lighthouse
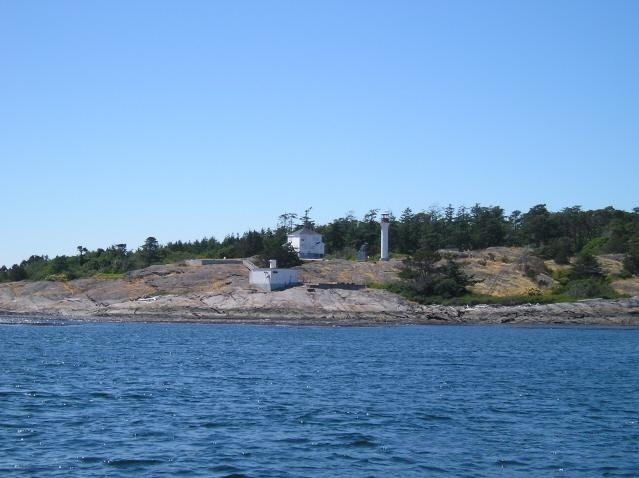
- Discovery Island Lighthouse
- Location: Vancouver Island; British Columbia; Canada
- Coordinates: 48.424610°N 123.225679°W

Tower
- Constructed: 1886 (first); 1958 (second)
- Construction: concrete tower
- Automated: 1996
- Height: 11.5 metres (38 ft)
- Shape: cylindrical tower with balcony and lantern
- Markings: white tower, red balcony and lantern
- Power source: solar power
- Operator: Discovery Island Marine Provincial Park

Light
- First lit: 1970 (current)
- Focal height: 28 metres (92 ft)
- Range: 15 nmi (28 km; 17 mi)
- Characteristic: Fl W 5s.

Discovery Island Lighthouse is an active lighthouse built in 1886 on Pandora Hill which is the highest point on Discovery Island in the province of British Columbia, Canada.

== History ==
The government appointed Richard Brinn to be the first lighthouse keeper. His daughter Mary Ann Croft assisted him. In 1902 after her father died Mary Ann Croft was officially appointed the lighthouse keeper, when she became the first female lighthouse keeper in Canada. In 1932 Croft retired, and moved to Victoria with a pension of $43 a month. She had spent a total of 46 years living on the island. In 1996 the lighthouse was automated after having been manned for 110 years. On September 3, 2004, the foghorn at the lighthouse was deactivated and removed from the station. Today nobody lives on the island and the lighthouse buildings are deteriorating.

== See also ==
- List of lighthouses in British Columbia
- List of lighthouses in Canada
- Discovery Island (British Columbia)
- Discovery Island Marine Provincial Park
- Captain E.G. Beaumont
