= Ministry of Construction Materials Industry =

Government ministry of the Soviet Union

The Ministry of Construction Materials Industry (Minstroymaterialov; Russian: Министерство промышленности строительных материалов CCCP) was a government ministry in the Soviet Union.

Originally established in 1939: disestablished in 1957; reestablished in 1963 as State Committee and renamed Ministry of Construction Materials Industry in 1965. The ministry was responsible for state production of construction materials.

== List of ministers ==
- Leonid Sosnin (24.1.1939 - 21.12.1944)
- Lazar Kaganovich (21.12.1944 - 12.3.1947)
- Semjon Ginzburg (12.3.1947 - 29.5.1950)
- Pavel Yudin (29.5.1950 - 10.4.1956)
- Lazar Kaganovich (3.11.1956 - 4.7.1957)
- Ivan Grishmanov (2.10.1965 - 4.1.1979)
- Aleksei Jasin (24.1.1979 - 15.7.1985)
- Sergei Voyenushkin (15.7.1985 - 17.7.1989)
