= Boris Vannikov =

Soviet politician (1897–1962)

- Борис Ванников
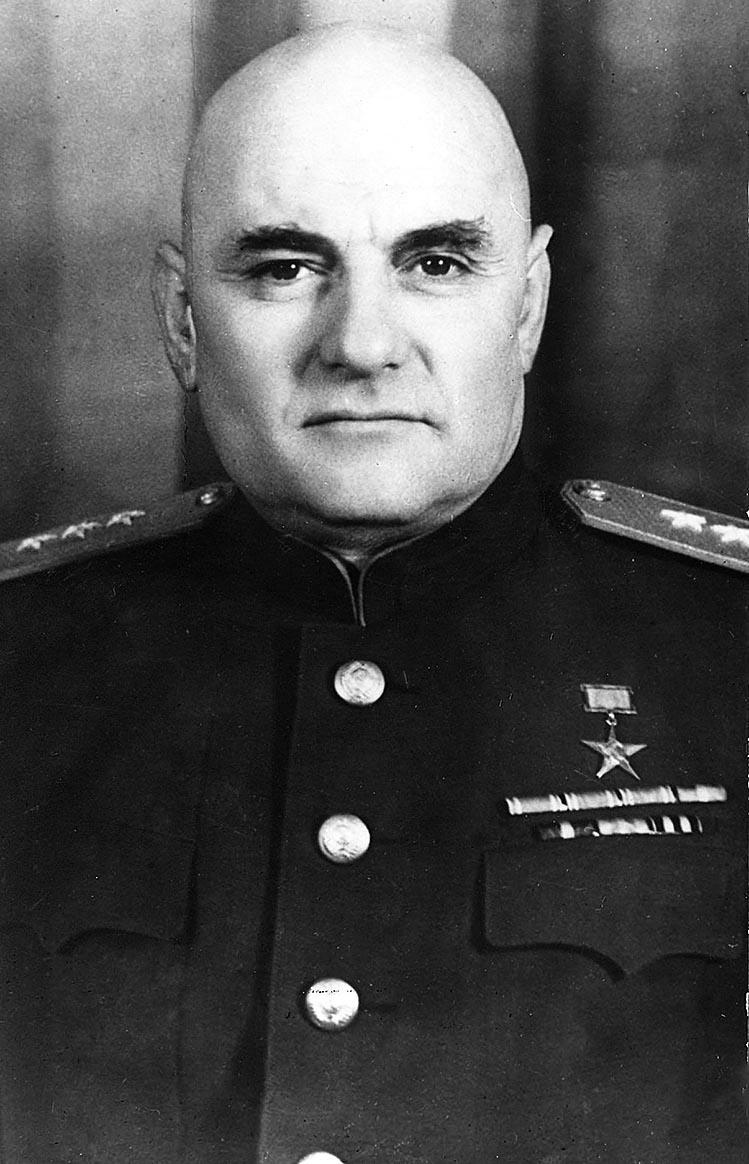
- Vannikov in a 1946 publication

Deputy Minister of Medium Machine-Building
- In office 1 July 1953 – 1958
- Premier: Nikolai Bulganin

People's Commissar for Armament
- In office 1 January 1939 – 9 June 1941
- Premier: Vyacheslav Molotov
- Preceded by: Mikhail Kaganovich
- Succeeded by: Dmitry Ustinov

People's Commissar for Defense Industry
- In office December 1937 – January 1939
- Premier: Vyacheslav Molotov

Personal details
- Born: Vannikov, Boris Lvovich (Ва́нников, Бори́с Льво́вич); 26 August 1897 Baku, Azerbaijan in Russian Empire (present-day Baku, Azerbaijan)
- Died: 22 February 1962 (aged 64) Moscow, Russia in Soviet Union
- Resting place: Kremlin Wall Necropolis
- Citizenship: Soviet Union
- Party: Communist Party of the Soviet Union
- Education: Bauman Moscow Technical University
- Occupation: Plant manager, politician
- Cabinet: Bulganin's government
- Awards: Stalin Prize (1951); Hero of Socialist Labor (1942, 1949, 1954)
- Civil service: Ministry of Defense Industry
- Branch: Red Army
- Rank: Colonel general
- Service years: 1918–41

Boris Lvovich Vannikov (Russian: Бори́с Льво́вич Ва́нников; 26 August 1897 – 22 February 1962), was a Soviet politician and a political commissar who was one of the senior program managers in the Soviet program of nuclear weapons.

== Biography ==
Boris Vannikov was born in Baku in Azerbaijan into the Jewish family that was employed in the petroleum industry. Insight in his early life is provided by the biographical accounts written by Russian engineer, Boris Chertok, who noted that Vannikov followed his father's footstep to work in the petroleum industry but later found work as a railroad construction worker and as locksmith. Chertok, nonetheless, described him as "quite energetic, typically Jewish in appearance, sometimes rudely cynical, sometimes very blunt, and friendly and amicable when necessary... [with] quite exceptional organizational skills."

At age 20, Vannikov joined the Communist Party of the Soviet Union and was its devout follower who engaged in the revolutionary politics as his role as an inspector in the People's Commissariat. According to the Russian-language Wikipedia, Vannikov studied technical subjects in the Bauman School when he moved to Moscow in 1920. It is uncleared if he ever received a diploma from Bauman School or even in school in Baku. During this time, the Russian Communist Party appointed him as the political commissar in the Red Army while he also filled his role as a plant manager at the Tula Arms Plant between 1933–36.

In December 1937, Vannikov was appointed as a People's Commissioner for Defense Industry until January 1939 when he moved as a People's Commissar for Armament from January 1939 till 7 June 1941 when he was dismissed and condemned to death "failing to carry out his duties." The sentence was never carried out due to the Germany launching a large-scale invasion of the eastern Soviet Union on 22 June 1941. Vannikov was released on 25 July 1941 and then appointed People's Commissar for Ammunition, a post he held from February 1942 until June 1946. Two of his siblings died during fighting in the Great Patriotic War of 1941-1945.

In 1945, Vannikov became involved in security matters when he was appointed in the 1st Chief Directorate— this appointment also allowed him to be involved in the Soviet program of nuclear weapons as a program manager, overseeing the arms logistics and ammunition.The Soviet People's Commissar for Internal Affairs at that time, Lavrenty Beria, and according to the accounts of Chertok, "Vannikov’s tremendous contribution was to eliminate problems in ammunitions production and delivery. Therefore, it was not the least bit surprising that Stalin and Beriya, despite Vannikov's past and his Jewish ethnicity, put him in charge of all operations for the development of the atomic bomb as head of the First Main Directorate." He inadvertently helped the Russian scientists Yulii Khariton and Igor Kurchatov to understand the problem of fission by walking close to their test reactor. His body fat reflected enough neutrons to approach criticality. His role as political commissioner in the Red Army ended when the Soviet Army was organized in 1946.

Vannikov was the first person who was awarded as a Hero of Socialist Labor three times (in 1942, 1949, and 1954), and he was twice awarded the Stalin Prize (in 1951 and 1953).

After Beria's arrest and death in 1953, Vannikov joined the Bulganin's government as the First Deputy Minister of Medium Machine-Building Ministry which consolidated the entire Soviet nuclear program when the First, Second, and Third Main Directorates were merged; the code-name for nuclear-related R&D and production in the USSR). After his retirement from the politics in 1958, Vannikov purportedly disliked the Soviet system in Russia. According to Beria's son, Vannikov said of the Soviet Union, "I hate it and yet I work for it. And I work honestly. What else can I do?" and that "Instead of shutting myself up in research I had to go into politics... Thereafter, I was done for."

Vannikov died on 22 February 1962 in Moscow, and his ashes were interred in the Kremlin Wall Necropolis.

== Awards ==
- Thrice Hero of Socialist Labor (3 June 1942, 29 October 1949, 4 January 1954)
- Six Order of Lenin (23 February 1939, 3 June 1942, 5 August 1944, 6 September 1947, 11 September 1956, 16 September 1957)
- Order of Suvorov 1st class (16 September 1945)
- Order of Kutuzov 1st class (18 November 1944)
- Stalin Prize (6 December 1951)
- Stalin Prize (31 December 1953)
