= Discovery Island (Bahamas) =

Island off the coast of Nassau, The Bahamas

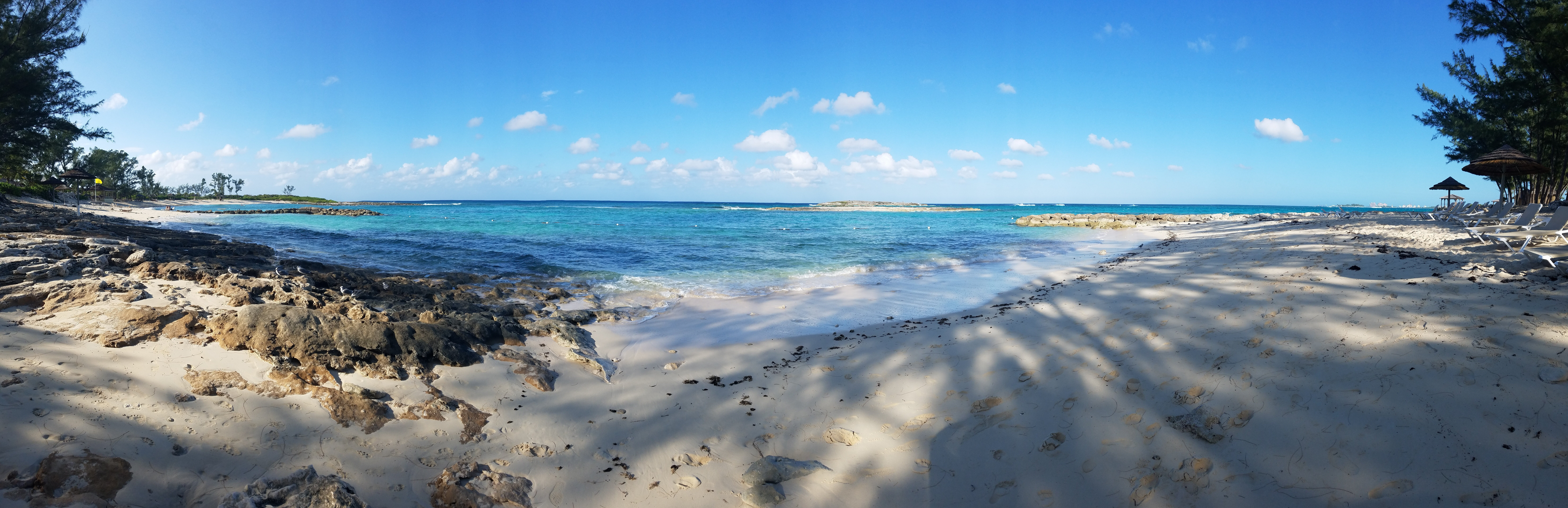
- Beach on the Sandals side of Discovery Island

- Location within Bahamas Location within the Caribbean

Geography
- Location: West Indies
- Coordinates: 25°05′28″N 77°24′24″W
- Archipelago: Lucayan Archipelago

Administration
- Bahamas

Discovery Island is a small privately owned island off the coast of Nassau. The western portion of the Island is Balmoral Island, a shore excursion for Royal Caribbean cruise lines. The eastern portion is Sandals Island and is owned by the Sandals Royal Bahamian Resort.
