= Jamie Dutcher =

American naturalist, author and sound recorder/sound mixer

Jamie Dutcher (born c. 1962), is an American naturalist, author and sound recorder/sound mixer. Jamie and her husband, Jim Dutcher, have collaborated on seven books and two films about wolves.

== Early life ==
Jamie Dutcher was born in Washington, D.C. and raised in Bethesda and Chevy Chase, Maryland. After attending Walt Whitman High School she graduated from the University of Maryland. She began her career as an animal keeper and veterinary technician at the Smithsonian's National Zoo in Washington, D.C. While working at the animal hospital of the National Zoo she began a correspondence with Jim Dutcher, and was invited to join his study of wolves in the Sawtooth Mountains in Idaho.

== Wolves ==
Jamie contributed her knowledge of animal husbandry and medical care to the Dutcher film projects, and recorded the vocalizations of the Sawtooth Pack, winning a Primetime Emmy award for the Discovery Channel wildlife documentary Wolves at Our Door (1997).

In 2005, the Dutcher's produced a follow–up documentary entitled, Living with Wolves, which chronicles their experiences living with the Idaho wolf pack, and founded Living with Wolves, a non-profit educational organization.

== Awards ==
Jamie Dutcher received the 1998 Outstanding Sound Mixing for Nonfiction Programming Emmy award for her work on Wolves at Our Door.

== Bibliography ==
- Dutcher, J., Dutcher, J., & Manfull, J. (2002). Wolves at Our Door: The Extraordinary Story of the Couple Who Lived with Wolves. New York: Pocket Books. ISBN 9780743400480
- Dutcher, J., & Dutcher, J. (2004). Living with Wolves. Seattle, WA: Mountaineers Books. ISBN 9781594850004
- Dutcher, J., Dutcher, J., Manfull, J., & Redford, R. (2013). The Hidden Life of Wolves. Washington: National Geographic. ISBN 9781426210129
- Dutcher, J., & Dutcher, J. (2015). A Friend for Lakota: The Incredible True Story of a Wolf Who Braved Bullying. Washington, D.C: National Geographic Kids. ISBN 9781426320828
- Dutcher, J., & Dutcher, J. (2016). Living with Wolves. Washington, D.C.: National Geographic Kids. ISBN 9781426325632
- Dutcher, J., & Dutcher, J., with Manfull, J. (2018). The Wisdom of Wolves: Lessons from the Sawtooth Pack. Washington, D.C.: National Geographic Books. ISBN 9781426218866
- Dutcher, J., & Dutcher, J. (2019). Running with Wolves. Washington, D.C.: National Geographic Books. ISBN 9781426333583
