= Oliver Henry Radkey =

American historian (1909–2000)

- Born: July 12, 1909; Edna, Texas, U.S.
- Died: July 21, 2000 (aged 91); Austin, Texas, U.S.
- Spouse: Jakoba Balt (m. 1936)

Academic background
- Education: Harvard University
- Influences: Sidney Bradshaw Fay

Academic work
- Institutions: University of Texas at Austin
- Main interests: Russian and Soviet history

Oliver Henry Radkey Jr. (July 12, 1909 – July 21, 2000) was an American historian of Russian and Soviet history. He was a professor of Russian history at the University of Texas at Austin.

Radkey received his degree from the University of Texas. Later he attended Harvard University, where he was influenced by Sidney Bradshaw Fay. Radkey went on a traveling fellowship through Central Europe and Russia until he returned to the United States aboard the SS Normandie. He married Jakoba Balt in 1936. He studied at Stanford University and taught at the University of Cincinnati before moving to the University of Texas.

== Works ==
- The Election to the Russian Constituent Assembly of 1917. Harvard University Press, 1950.
- The Agrarian Foes of Bolshevism: Promise and Default of the Russian Socialist Revolutionaries, February to October 1917. 1958. (Radkey's doctoral dissertation)
- The Sickle Under the Hammer: The Russian Socialist Revolutionaries in the Early Months of Soviet Rule. Columbia University Press, 1964.
- The Unknown Civil War in Soviet Russia: A Study of the Green Movement in the Tambov Region 1920-1921. Stanford Hoover Press, 1976.
- Russia Goes to the Polls: The Election to the All-Russian Constituent Assembly, 1917. Cornell University Press, 1989.
