= Chatham Islands (British Columbia) =

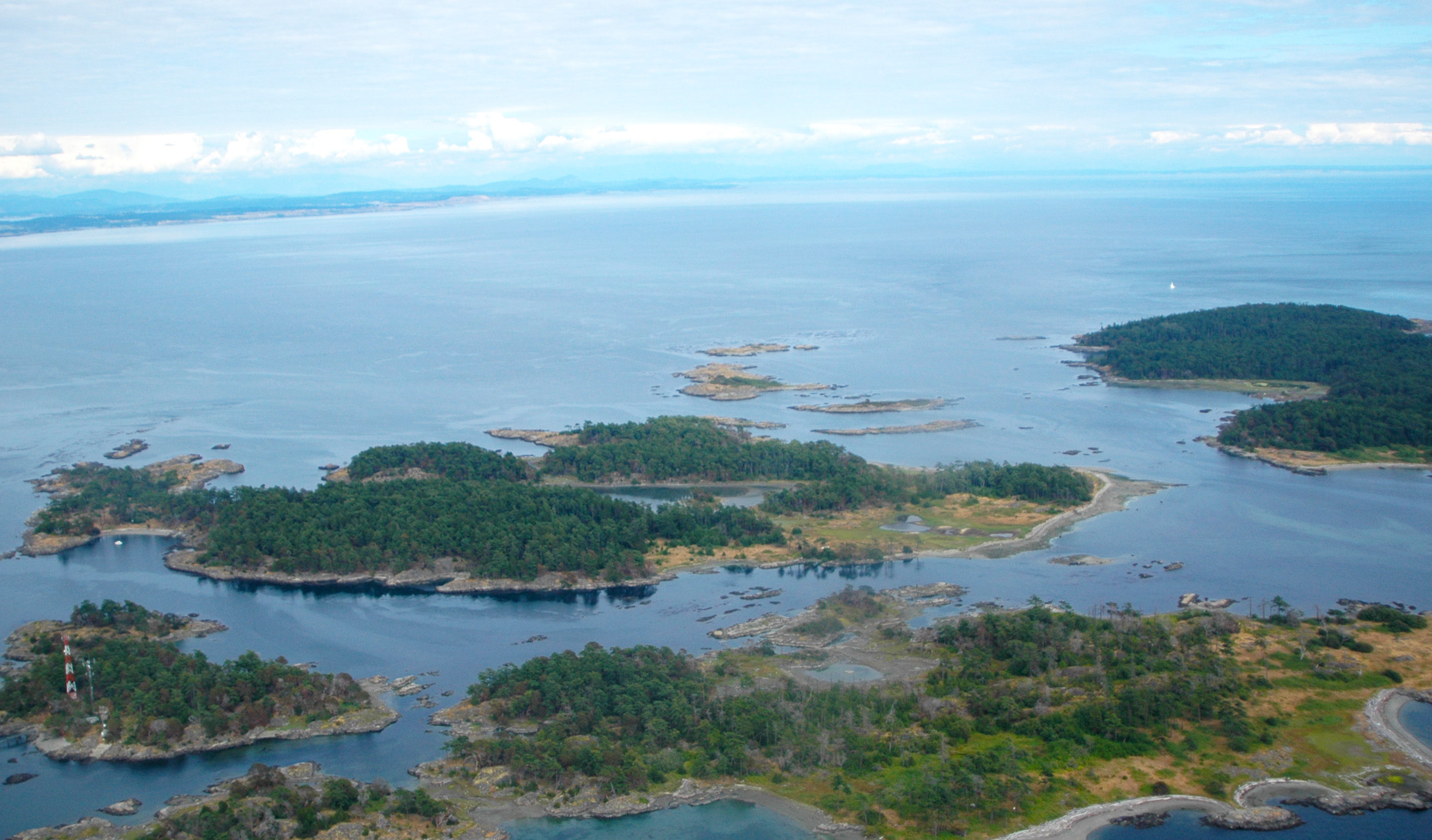
- Chatham Islands as seen from the air.

- Location of Chatham Islands in British Columbia
- Coordinates: 48°26′00″N 123°15′00″W
- Country: Canada
- Province: British Columbia

The Chatham Islands are a group of islands off the east coast of Oak Bay, British Columbia, Canada. All the islands (except the Alpha Islets ecological reserve) are in Chatham Islands Indian Reserve No. 4, under the control of the Songhees First Nation. The island foreshore, defined as the land between low tide and the beginning of land-based vegetation, is provincial Crown land.

The Songhees First Nation did not forfeit its rights to the foreshore and aquatic lands to the Crown. Starting in 1701, in its North American colonies, the British Crown entered into treaties with indigenous groups to support peaceful economic and military relations; the islands are treaty lands.

Between the early 18th century and the end of the 19th century, the Crown signed treaties that defined the respective rights of indigenous peoples and European newcomers to use the North American lands that indigenous peoples historically occupied. The treaties signed after 1763 transferred Aboriginal title to the Crown in exchange for reserve lands and other benefits. However, the Songhees never forfeited their rights to IR 3 & IR 4 foreshore, currently protected by the Songhees due to archaeological significance.

The Chatham Islands were given their current name in 1846 by surveyors in honor of HMS Chatham, the escort ship of HMS Discovery, which carried 18th century British explorer Captain George Vancouver on his voyage to chart the coastline of British Columbia between 1792 and 1794 (the Vancouver Expedition). The adjacent Discovery Island was named after the Discovery.

Around 2012, a coastal grey wolf (Canis lupus) from a specialized population commonly called "coastal wolves" travelled through or near Victoria, and swam to the Chatham Islands. Named Takaya, he lived on the small island group for eight years until he left on his own accord and headed back to the mainland, later being shot by a hunter near Shawnigan Lake.

== See also ==
- Chatham Strait
- Chatham Sound
- Discovery Island
- Takaya (wolf)
