= Ministry of Armaments (Soviet Union) =

Government ministry of the Soviet Union

The Ministry of Armament (Russian: Министерство вооружения СССР) was a government ministry in the Soviet Union. Before 1946 it was known as the People's Commissariat of Armament of the USSR (Народный комиссариат вооружения СССР).

The Ministry of Armaments was subordinate to the USSR Council of Ministers and was located on Mayakovskogo Street in Moscow.

== History ==
On January 11, 1939 the People's Commissariat of Defence Industry of the USSR (Народный комиссариат оборонной промышленности) was divided into several departments, among which was the People's Commissariat of Armament.

It oversaw the work of 28 manufacturing plants and eight design offices. In 1939 it employed 204,458 workers.

It played a leading role in the whole complex of arms which devotes major attention to the head of Lavrenty Beria. In 1946 the office was renamed the Ministry of Arms of the USSR (Министерство вооружения СССР – МВ).

== Responsibilities ==
The ministry was in charge of the production of weapons equipment and ammunition for the USSR Armed Forces; it had under its administration all plants factories and workshops manufacturing any armaments or ammunition, regardless whether this production represented the main or secondary occupation of such plants.

There were few plants in the Soviet Union that were strictly military plants, and since the tendency was to keep the production of war materials as secret as possible, it was customary to assign some peacetime production line to any plant manufacturing armaments. All such plants, even though they were concerned with the production of peacetime goods, were put under the administration of the Ministry of Armaments. Each plant working for the Ministry of Armaments was assigned a number that was used in official correspondence, e.g., Kirov Plant 304 and Plant 707.

== List of ministers ==
- Moses Rukhimovitsh (8.12.1936 - 16.10.1937)
- Mikhail Kaganovich (16.10.1937 - 11.1.1939)
- Boris Vannikov (11.1.1939 - 9.6.1941)
- Dmitri Ustinov (9.6.1941 - 6.3.1953)
