= Mikhail Kaganovich =

Soviet politician

- Михаил Каганович
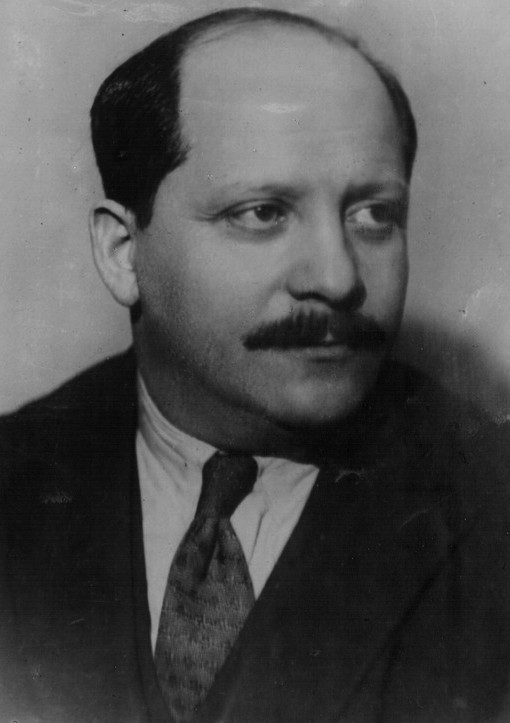
- Kaganovich in 1938
- Born: 16 October 1888; Kiev Governorate, Russian Empire
- Died: 1 July 1941 (aged 52); Moscow, Russian SFSR, Soviet Union
- Political party: RSDLP (Bolsheviks) (1905–1918); Russian Communist Party (1918–1941)
- Awards: Order of Lenin

Mikhail Moiseyevich Kaganovich (Russian: Михаи́л Моисе́евич Кагано́вич; 16 October 1888 – 1 July 1941) was a Soviet politician. He was the older brother of Lazar Kaganovich. He was born in Kiev Governorate. A metal worker, Kaganovich joined the Bolsheviks in 1905 and fought with the Red Army during the Russian Civil War. In 1923-27, he was based in Nizhny Novgorod, working on economic management. He was transferred to Moscow in 1927.

He was a "close friend" of Sergo Ordzhonikidze and served as one of his deputies from 1928 to 1936. In 1934, he was made a member of the Central Committee of the Communist Party and an alternate member of the Orgburo. He was appointed People's Commissar of Defence Industry from 1937 to 1939, and then People's Commissar of Aviation Industry from 1939 to 1940.

== Personality ==
V. S. Emelyanov in his memoirs characterized M. Kaganovich as follows: “He was a rude, noisy person. I never saw him with his mouth closed - he always talked and always lectured, liked to joke, but his jokes were often inappropriate, not witty and insulting to those whom they affected.... The People's Commissariat was essentially led by his talented deputies I. T. Tevosyan, B. L. Vannikov and M. V. Khrunichev".

== Arrest and death ==
Having survived the Great Purge, Kaganovich was removed from office in January 1941, and appointed director of a factory in Kazan. On 21 February 1941, Kaganovich was censured during the 5th Plenary Session of the 18th Congress of the All-Union Communist Party and warned "that if he does not correct himself in the new work, if he does not fulfill the instructions of the party and the government, he will be removed from the membership of the Central Committee of the CPSU (b) and removed from the leadership."

On 7 June 1941, Kaganovich's former deputy Boris Vannikov was arrested after he had disputed a decision to halt the production of guns a month before the German invasion of the USSR. He was tortured in prison by Boris Rodos and, when barely conscious, signed a confession pre-written by Rodos implicating himself and Kaganovich in a conspiracy to sabotage Soviet air defences. Other officers repeated the accusation under torture.

Kaganovich's brother, Lazar, was summoned by Stalin and told that Mikhail had been chosen by the Nazis as head of their puppet government-in-waiting, "an idea so preposterous that it was either the solecism of an NKGB simpleton, or, more likely, a joke between Stalin and Beria." Rumors circulated that Lazar "had not interceded for [Mikhail] and had sided with Stalin. Lazar himself denied this in several interviews, insisting that he had told Stalin directly that it was a lie and had asked that his brother be given an opportunity to confront his accusers."

There are three differing accounts of Kaganovich's death. According to the first one he was summoned to the office of Anastas Mikoyan, where, in the presence of Beria and Malenkov, he was confronted by Vannikov, who repeated the confession he had made under torture. Mikhail Kaganovich was told to wait outside and went into Mikoyan's private lavatory and shot himself. By committing suicide before he was arrested, he had protected his family. A different account was given by Nikita Khrushchev during a delegation meeting with a Romanian representative in Moscow in 1964, in which he claimed that "Stalin interrogated [Kaganovich] personally, [a]fter that he was taken to the WC and shot". Mikoyan gave yet another version, stating that "Kaganovich was interrogated by Molotov, Malenkov, and Beria, and was shot afterwards. Beria explained that it was a [sic] stupidity because, while he was being led to the WC to be shot, Molotov, Malenkov, and Beria had decided to free him."

== Rehabilitation ==
On 6 May 1953, two months after Stalin's death, Beria submitted a memo to the Praesidium of the Central Committee saying that the evidence against Kaganovich was "slanderous". He was posthumously 'rehabilitated' the following day, and his widow, Tsitsiliya Yulyevna Kaganovich (1896-1959) was awarded a lump sum payment of 5,000 rubles and a pension of 200 rubles a month. Kaganovich is buried at Novodevichy Cemetery.

== Bibliography ==
- 02936 (ru)
- Каганович Михаил Моисеевич (ru)
