= George Matthew Dutcher =

American historian (1874–1959)

- Born: October 16, 1874; Pleasant Valley, New York, United States
- Died: February 22, 1959 (aged 84); East Hampton, New York, United States
- Education: Cornell University (PhD)
- Spouse: Andrienne Van Winkle

George Matthew Dutcher (October 16, 1874 – February 22, 1959) was an American historian and professor at Wesleyan University.

He was born on 16 September 1874, in Pleasant Valley, New York.

He received a BA and a PhD from Cornell University, where he studied under historian George Burr, as well as an LLD (honorary degree) from Allegheny College in 1939.

He was a member of the Acorn Club, the Phi Beta Kappa, and was vice-president of the Connecticut Historical Society from 1945 to 1954.

He married Andrienne Van Winkle. He died on February 22, 1959, at Resthaven Hospital in East Hampton, New York.

== Works ==
- The Political Awakening of the East: Studies of Political Progress in Egypt, India, China, Japan, and the Philippines (The Abingdon Press, 1925)
- A Guide to Historical Literature (1937), editor
