= Discovery Island (British Columbia) =

Island in British Columbia, Canada

Coordinates: 48°25.4′N 123°14.0′W

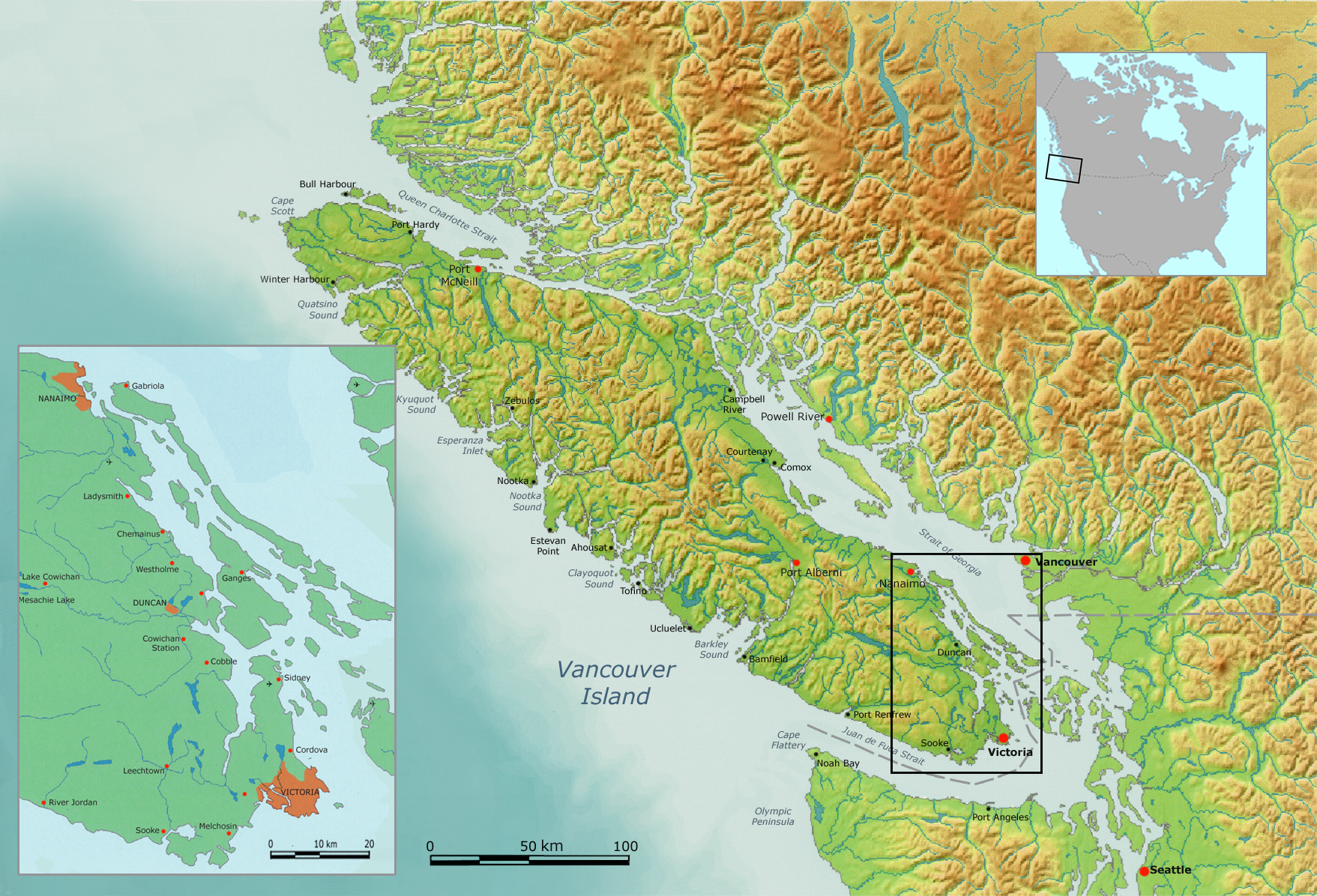
Discovery Island is to the east of Victoria, British Columbia (see inset map)

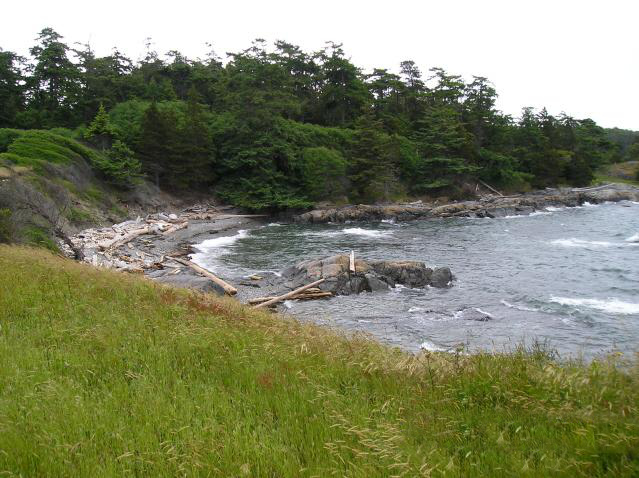
Discovery Island Marine Park

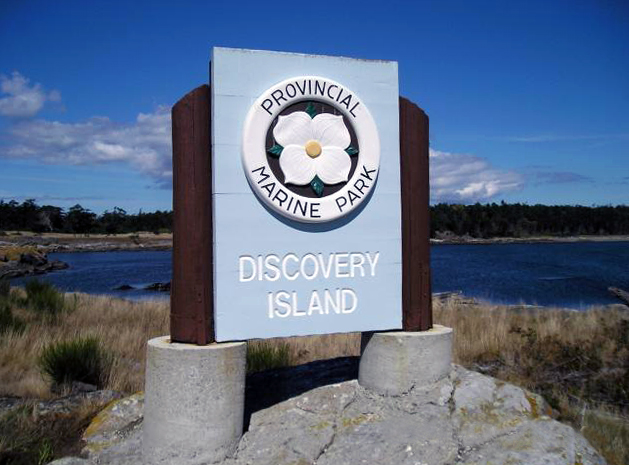
Discovery Island Marine Park

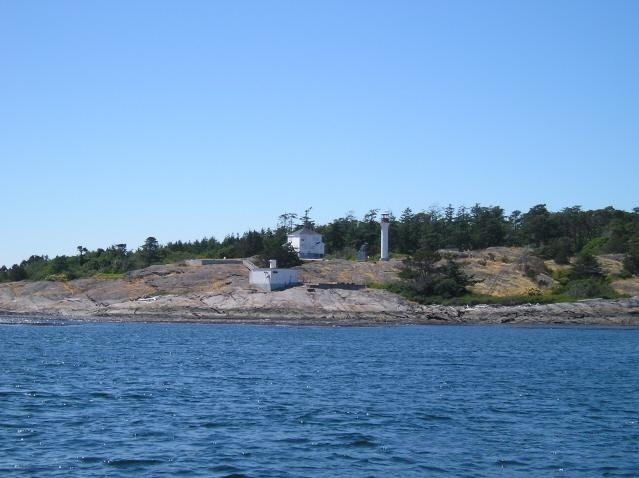
Discovery Island Lighthouse

Discovery Island is located off the eastern side of Vancouver Island and is viewable from Ten Mile Point, near Cadboro Bay, and Oak Bay. Discovery Island Marine Provincial Park occupies the southern portion of Discovery Island, 4.8 kilometres (3 mi) east of Oak Bay. The northern portion of the island is part of Discovery Island Indian Reserve 3, under the control of the Songhees First Nation.

Discovery island was named in 1846 by surveyors in honour of HMS Discovery, the ship used by 18th-century British Explorer Captain George Vancouver to chart the coastline of British Columbia between 1792 and 1794 (see the Vancouver Expedition). The adjacent Chatham Islands were named after his escort ship, HMS Chatham.

During the early stages of the 1862 Pacific Northwest smallpox epidemic, which started in Victoria, almost all Songhees self-quarantined themselves by abandoning their villages and relocating en masse to Discovery Island. Other indigenous people, many already infected, were forced to leave the Victoria area. Some tried to join the refugees on Discovery Island, but the Songhees fought off such attempts. Due to their self-quarantine as well as HBC physician Dr. John Helmcken's efforts to vaccinate as many Songhees as he could, the Songhees were one of the few First Nations to survive the epidemic with few deaths.

The Lighthouse at Sea Bird Point, the eastern end of Discovery Island, marks the junction of the Haro and Juan De Fuca Straits. These two straits form the border between Canada and the United States. The lighthouse was built in 1886 and staffed for 110 years before being fully automated in 1996. The island has two homes for the light keeper's families, a helicopter pad, a diesel power generation station, a well, a water reservoir, a boathouse and dock. The coast guard used to keep a truck on the island. Sea Bird Point was named after an American paddle steamer which caught fire and was run aground in 1858 to save the lives of the crew.

Designated as a park in 1972, the uninhabited and undeveloped 61 hectares (150 acres) Discovery Island Marine Provincial Park was once the home of Captain E.G. Beaumont, who purchased part of the island in 1918. He died in 1967 after living on Discovery Island with his wife for nearly half a century. Beaumont owned roughly 65 hectares (160 acres) (half) of Discovery Island, and in his will gave his share of the island to the province of British Columbia (with the exception of 3.52 hectares (8.71 acres), which was transferred to Scouts Canada and later sold to private owners). Beaumont was an avid seaman and even in his 80s would regularly row his boat from Discovery Island to Ten Mile Point, where he would go for walks in the woods. Evidence of the Beaumonts' beautiful home and gardens overlooking Rudlin Bay can still be seen. The home was designed on a nautical motif by the noted architect Francis Rattenbury.

Discovery Island Marine Provincial Park is open year round. There is a camping fee and services provided from May 1 - September 30. During the off-season, there is no fee and no services. There are gravel beaches and a few walking and hiking trails along the shores and through fir and arbutus woodlands. The trail system runs from the lighthouse on Sea Bird Point to Commodore Point and across to the western shore of the park. Hikers can ascend the 38-metre (125 ft) Pandora Hill for improved views of the area and spectacular sweeping views of the Olympic Mountains.

In May 2012 a lone wolf took up residence on Discovery Island. The park was closed and attempts to trap the wolf were made, but these were unsuccessful, and it was decided to reopen the park. The wolf had proven safe to humans. The lone wolf, Takaya, was relocated to an area near Port Renfrew by conservation officers in January 2020. After relocation, Takaya was shot and killed by a hunter in March 2020.

Other flora and fauna on the island include sea lions, seals, mink, mussels, clams, rock crab, morel mushrooms, and blackberries.

== Climate ==
Discovery Island has a Mediterranean climate (Csb) with some of the mildest winters in Canada, if not the mildest, even by British Columbia standards, having a yearly mean of 11.5 °C (52.7 °F), warmer than Victoria's University weather station which has a yearly mean of 11.2 °C (52.2 °F). Snowfall is extremely rare with over three-fourths of years not experiencing a single snowfall, which is a sharp contrast to the rest of the country.

Climate data for Discovery Island, British Columbia
Month	Jan	Feb	Mar	Apr	May	Jun	Jul	Aug	Sep	Oct	Nov	Dec	Year
Record high °C (°F)	14.5 (58.1)	14.5 (58.1)	17.5 (63.5)	24.5 (76.1)	27 (81)	29.5 (85.1)	32 (90)	33.5 (92.3)	32.2 (90.0)	21.9 (71.4)	16.5 (61.7)	14.2 (57.6)	33.5 (92.3)
Mean daily maximum °C (°F)	8.9 (48.0)	9.5 (49.1)	10.9 (51.6)	13.4 (56.1)	15.4 (59.7)	18 (64)	19.6 (67.3)	19.5 (67.1)	18.4 (65.1)	14 (57)	10.9 (51.6)	9.1 (48.4)	14 (57)
Mean daily minimum °C (°F)	5.8 (42.4)	6.1 (43.0)	6.6 (43.9)	8.2 (46.8)	9.9 (49.8)	11.6 (52.9)	12.6 (54.7)	12.7 (54.9)	11.9 (53.4)	10.0 (50.0)	7.8 (46.0)	6.0 (42.8)	9.1 (48.4)
Record low °C (°F)	−6.5 (20.3)	−5.2 (22.6)	−2.5 (27.5)	2.3 (36.1)	4.5 (40.1)	0 (32)	9.1 (48.4)	5.5 (41.9)	7.5 (45.5)	2.8 (37.0)	−5.8 (21.6)	−6.4 (20.5)	−6.5 (20.3)
Source: https://web.archive.org/web/20140424025317/http://climate.weather.gc.ca/climateData/monthlydata_e.html?timeframe=3&Prov=BC&StationID=27226&mlyRange=1998-05-01%7C2005-08-01&cmdB2=Go&cmdB1=Go&Year=2003&cmdB2=Go#
