= Wolves at Our Door =

- Directed by: Jim Dutcher
- Written by: Mose Richards
- Produced by: Jim Dutcher
- Narrated by: Richard Kiley
- Cinematography: Jim Dutcher
- Distributed by: Discovery Channel
- Release date: October 27, 1997 (US)
- Running time: 52 minutes

Wolves at Our Door is a 1997 documentary film about the "Sawtooth Pack", a group of wolves in the Sawtooth Mountains in Idaho, United States. The film was produced and directed by Jim Dutcher and first aired on The Discovery Channel. It is narrated by Richard Kiley. A two–hour sequel, Living with Wolves, was released in 2005.

== Production ==
In 1990, filmmaker, Jim Dutcher, began observing a pack of wolves in the Sawtooth Mountains in Idaho. Later joined by his wife, Jamie Dutcher, the couple hand-raised and bottle fed pups before releasing them within a larger encampment. Having gained their trust, the Dutchers were able to film and record the wolves in close proximity. Using both visual and audio recordings, they documented the pack's hierarchy, vocalizations, and behavior.

=== Sawtooth Pack ===
Initially starting with one pair of adults, Makuyi and Akai, the pack grew to include:

- Original wolves
  - Akai, adult, original alpha male, was mid–rank from his home in Minnesota
  - Makuyi, adult, mated with Akai, from a wolf shelter in Montana
  - Motaki, (Blackfoot for "shadow"), original omega female, killed by a mountain lion
- First litter (1991)
  - Kamots, (Blackfoot for "freedom"), the alpha male
  - Lakota, (Sioux for "friend"), the omega male
- Second litter (1992)
  - Amani, (Blackfoot for "speaking the truth"), brother of Matsi
  - Motomo, (Blackfoot for "he who goes first"), brother of Matsi
  - Matsi, (Blackfoot for "sweet and brave), the beta male
- Third litter (1994)
  - Chemukh, (Nez Perce for "black"), the alpha female
  - Wahots, (Nez Perce for "likes to howl"), brother of Wyakin and Chemukh
  - Wyakin, (Nez Perce for "spirit"), other female in the pack
- Fourth litter/Sawtooth pups (1996)
  - Ayet, (Nez Perce for "girl"), pup of Kamots and Chemukh
  - Piyip, (Nez Perce "boy"), pup of Kamots and Chemukh
  - Motaki, pup of Kamots and Chemukh, named after the original omega female

The final surviving pack member, Piyip, died on July 5, 2013 (age 17).

== Airing and release ==
The Discovery Channel first aired the film on October 27, 1997. It was the channel's most successful wildlife documentary film and would garner three Emmy Award nominations, winning two for cinematography and sound mixing. It was released on DVD on June 19, 2001.

== Awards and accolades ==
In 1998 Wolves at Our Door was nominated for an Emmy Award in the Outstanding Nonfiction Special category. Jim Dutcher received the Emmy award for Outstanding Cinematography for Nonfiction Programming. Jamie Dutcher received the Emmy award for Outstanding Sound Mixing for Nonfiction Programming.
