= Jim Dutcher =

American naturalist, cinematographer, director and author

Jim Dutcher (born 1943), is an American naturalist, cinematographer, director and author. He has written eight books and produced three wildlife films about wolves. Jim and his wife, Jamie Dutcher, are the creators of the two-time Emmy winning documentary, Wolves at Our Door, and founders of the non-profit organization, Living with Wolves. The Dutchers are recognized as two of America's most knowledgeable experts on wolves.

== Career ==
In 1962, Jim Dutcher began his career as an underwater cinematographer, and then as a wildlife film producer for National Geographic, a dream he had pursued since childhood. His early experiences with a camera were spent underwater on the Florida coast. In 1985, his first television film, Water, Birth, the Planet Earth, began a career spent with animals that range from tiny hatchling sea turtles to one of the top ranking predators in North America – the wolf. Combining extraordinary camera work and the trust he gains from his subjects, Jim’s films take audiences into a world never before filmed: inside beaver lodges, down burrows to observe wolf pups, and into the life of a mother mountain lion as she cares for her newborn kittens. His work includes the National Geographic special A Rocky Mountain Beaver Pond, and ABC World of Discovery’s two highest-rated films, Cougar: Ghost of the Rockies and Wolf: Return of a Legend.

During the 1990s, Jim began a film project in the Sawtooth Mountains of Idaho with the now-famous Sawtooth Pack. Determined to overcome deadly misperceptions about wolves, Jim and his wife, Jamie Dutcher, camped in the wilderness observing the wolves' social hierarchy, recording their vocalizations, filming their activities, and earning their trust. What they discovered were animals devoted to one another, capable of emotional bonds and affection resembling those of human families. Their six-year experience led to the creation of the National Geographic Society book The Hidden Life of Wolves as well as seven other books and three prime-time television documentaries on wolves. With more than 30 years of their lives devoted to eradicating ancient myths surrounding wolves, they remain dedicated to sharing their unique and personal eye-witness knowledge.

In 1991, Jim received the prestigious Wrangler Award for his cougar documentary from the National Cowboy Hall of Fame. In 1995, the Governor of Idaho appointed Jim as an ex officio member of the Idaho Wolf Management Committee, where he served until 2001. As part of the wolf reintroduction initiative at Yellowstone National Park in 1994, Jim served as a consultant for the design of pack holding enclosures, and as a specialist in the handling of the reintroduced wolves brought from Canada. The Dutchers also led three National Geographic expeditions to Alaska, working with the late revered wolf biologist Dr. Gordon Haber, observing pack hunting techniques and the culture of shared knowledge within individual wolf families.

In 2005, moved by the plight of wolves, the Dutchers put down their filmmaking equipment and founded the national nonprofit organization, Living with Wolves, seeking to re-establish the wolf in its rightful place in the American West. Since then, they have presented trusted factual information in multimedia presentations, books, films, educator guides for schools, social media, and museum exhibits as they continue to promote understanding of this persecuted species by sharing their knowledge and lifetime of study. Living with Wolves has become a premier advocate for wolves, reaching more than 30 million people worldwide.

== Filmography ==
Year	Work	Functioned as			Notes
Year	Work	Director	Cinematographer	Producer	Notes
1985	Water, Birth, the Planet Earth	Yes	Yes	Yes	National Geographic Explorer
1987	Rocky Mountain Beaver Pond	Yes	Yes	Yes	National Geographic Explorer
1990	Cougar: Ghost of the Rockies	Yes	Yes	Yes	ABC's World of Discovery
1993	Wolf: Return of a Legend	Yes	Yes	Yes	ABC's World of Discovery
1997	Wolves at Our Door	Yes	Yes	Yes	Discovery Channel
2005	Living with Wolves	Yes	Yes	Yes	Discovery Channel

== Awards ==
Working together, Jim and Jamie Dutcher created two of Discovery Channel’s highest rated wildlife films, Wolves at Our Door and Living with Wolves. Their television specials on wolves have won three Prime-Time Emmys, for Cinematography, for Outstanding Programming and for Sound Recording.

== Bibliography ==
- Dutcher, J., & Ballantine, R. (1996). The Sawtooth Wolves. New York: Rufus Publications, Inc. ISBN 9780964991507
- Dutcher, J., Dutcher, J., & Manfull, J. (2002). Wolves at Our Door: The Extraordinary Story of the Couple Who Lived with Wolves. New York: Pocket Books. ISBN 9780743400480
- Dutcher, J., & Dutcher, J. (2004). Living with Wolves. Seattle, WA: Mountaineers Books. ISBN 9781594850004
- Dutcher, J., Dutcher, J., Manfull, J., & Redford, R. (2013). The Hidden Life of Wolves. Washington, D.C.: National Geographic. ISBN 9781426210129
- Dutcher, J., & Dutcher, J. (2015). A Friend for Lakota: The Incredible True Story of a Wolf Who Braved Bullying. Washington, D.C: National Geographic Kids. ISBN 9781426320828
- Dutcher, J., & Dutcher, J. (2016). Living with Wolves. Washington, D.C.: National Geographic Kids. ISBN 9781426325632
- Dutcher, J., & Dutcher, J., with Manfull, J. (2018). The Wisdom of Wolves: Lessons from the Sawtooth Pack. Washington, D.C.: National Geographic Books. ISBN 9781426218866
- Dutcher, J., & Dutcher, J. (2019). Running with Wolves. Washington, D.C.: National Geographic Books. ISBN 9781426333583
