= John R. Dutcher =

Canadian physicist

John R. Dutcher is a Canadian physicist.

Dutcher completed a co-op degree in engineering and physics at Dalhousie University in 1983, then chose to specialize in condensed matter physics, earning a master's degree in the subject at the University of British Columbia before obtaining a doctorate at Simon Fraser University. His laboratory at the University of Guelph researches soft matter and biological physics. Dutcher was granted a Tier I Canada Research Chair in 2006. In 2007, Dutcher was elected a fellow of the American Physical Society,"[f]or fundamental contributions to the understanding of polymers at the nanoscale; particularly to the development of novel experimental techniques for the study of ultrathin films."
