= All-Ukrainian Congress of Soviets =

Governing body of the Ukrainian SSR from 1917 to 1938

All-Ukrainian Congress of Soviets Всеукраїнський з'їзд Рад Vseukrayinsky zyizd Rad
- Ukrainian SSR
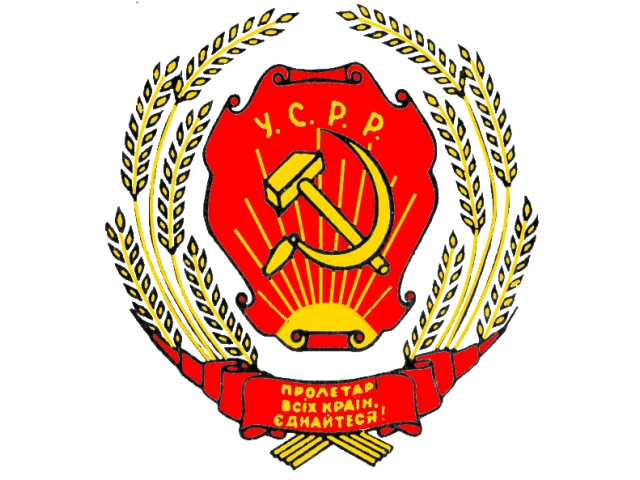

Type
- Type: Congress of Soviets

History
- Established: 17 December [O.S. 4 December] 1917
- Disbanded: 21 February 1938
- Preceded by: Central Council of Ukraine
- Succeeded by: Ukrainian SSR
- Seats: Variable

Meeting place
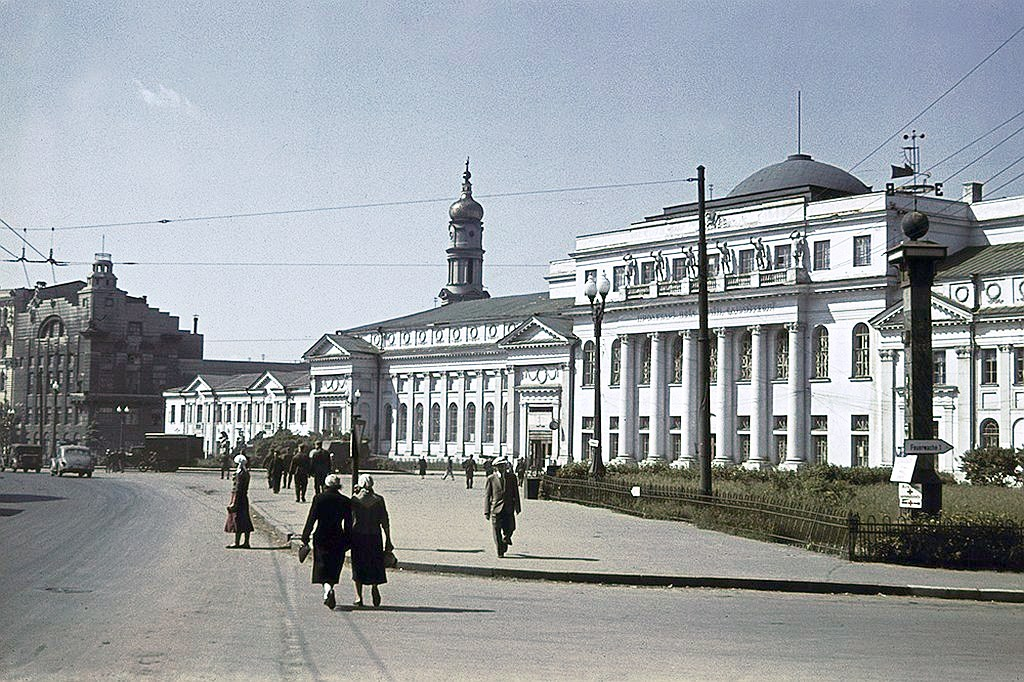
- Building of Noble Assembly, Kharkiv

Constitution
- Constitution of the Ukrainian SSR

The All-Ukrainian Congress of Soviets (Ukrainian: Всеукраїнський з'їзд Рад, romanized: Vseukraïns'kyy zyizd Rad, Russian: Всеукраинский съезд Советов, romanized: Vseukrainskiy syezd Sovetov) was the supreme governing body of the Ukrainian Soviet Socialist Republic from 1917 to 1938. From 1922 to 1938 the Constitution of the Ukrainian SSR, modeled on the 1918 Russian Constitution, mandated that Congress to be convened at least twice a year. The 1926 Constitution (in correspondence to all Soviet constitutions) lowered the minimum to once a year.

In total there were 14 Congresses of Soviets that for most of the time took place in Kharkiv.

== Description ==
Following the end of the Russian Civil War and foreign military intervention, in Ukraine the ruling party of Bolsheviks continued actively to use the Soviet form of dictatorship of proletariat in its internal policy. Formation of composition and structure of the All-Ukrainian Congress of Soviets, the All-Ukrainian Central Executive Committee, and its Presidium continued to be carried out with help of undemocratic and multi-stage electoral system under the leadership of the Bolshevik Party organs. According to the 1919 Constitution of the Ukrainian SSR, active and passive electoral right at elections to local Soviets was granted only to workers, soldiers, and sailors as well as foreigners who belonged to workers' class and working peasantry (Article 20). Deprived of the right to vote, "even if they belong to one of the above categories", were those individuals who used hired labor with a selfish purpose or live on unearned income, private traders, commercial middlemen, monks and spiritual superiors, officials and agents of former police, members of the House of Romanov, deranged and those who are under guardianship, sentenced. The constitutional legislation of the Russian SFSR and other union republics has deprived of the right to vote those categories of people for political and laborious conditions. Later those restriction expanded to those "working elements" who labeled themselves by clearly kulak actions or active protests against the Soviet regime, former Petlurites, "bandits of any kind", moonshiners, deserters, and other enemies of the Soviet regime.

== History ==
=== First Congress (Kyiv) ===
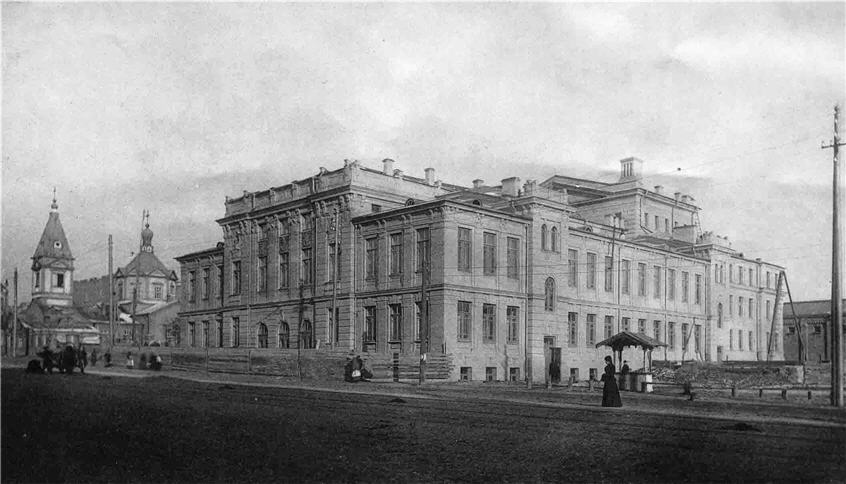
Trinity Public House (also known at that time as Sadovsky Theater)

The All-Ukrainian Congress of Workers', Soldiers', and Peasants' Deputies convened in Kyiv from December 17 (December 4, old style) to December 19, 1917, in the hall of the M. Sadovsky Theater (also known as Trinity Public House). Over 2,500 delegates participated at the congress. The Congress was called by the Kyiv regional soviet of workers' and soldiers' deputies on the request of the Bolshevik organizations of Ukraine. Concurrently, a regional congress of Bolsheviks of Ukraine took place in Kyiv from December 16 to 18. The Bolshevik Congress created a united political party of Ukraine the "RSDLP(b) - Social-Democracy of Ukraine" headed by the Chief Committee.

The first addressed issue was the election of the Congress presidium which was headed by the honorary chairman of congress Mykhailo Hrushevsky. The central question on the congress agenda was the "Ultimatum of the Sovnarkom of Russia to the Central Council of Ukraine". On December 18, 1917, the congress condemned the ultimatum. The Bolshevik faction leader and member of organizational committee Vladimir Zatonsky announced that there has been a misunderstanding as too many delegates that were present at the congress without a right of vote. Zatonsky proposed to announce a break and check credentials of all delegates. As an answer to the proposal, the leader of the Peasant Association Mykola Stasyuk declared that the regional committee of Soviets of Workers' and Soldiers' Deputies wished to falsify the will of Ukrainian people by giving preference to workers and soldier who in addition were not even Ukrainians over peasants. Therefore, the central committee of the Peasant Association took care on its part to increase the peasant representation at the congress. After that Bolsheviks proposed to recognize the congress as a consultative meeting. When the proposal was rejected, the 127 supporters of Bolsheviks left the congress in protest. The rest participating delegates recognized the assembly as a competent congress, and expressed support for the Central Rada.

On December 18, 1917, the 124 delegates from 49 Soviets who left the Kyiv Congress gathered at a separate meeting in the Kyiv Central Bureau of Trade Unions.

=== First bolshevik-controlled Congress (Kharkiv) ===
On December 21, 1917, the Red Guards of the Soviet Russia led by Vladimir Antonov-Ovseyenko occupied Kharkiv. At night on December 22, 1917, the Russian Red Guards with local Bolsheviks disarmed Ukrainian military units and arrested leaders of the Kharkiv City Council and garrison. On December 23, 1917, Bolsheviks established a revkom (revolutionary committee). The headquarters of a local Red Guard was established on December 14, 1917, and was located in the Stock Exchange building at Market Square (today Ploshcha Konstytutsii or Constitution Square).

On December 24–25, 1917 in the Kharkiv building of Noble Assembly (Market Square) another First Congress of Soviets was held. The congress gathered initially 964 participants, amount of which later grew to 1250. The congress reviewed several issues: attitudes towards the Central Council of Ukraine, war and peace as well as about organization of military force, about Ukraine and Soviet Russia, estate and financial issues and others.

The congress approved the Treaty of Brest-Litovsk between Russian SFSR and Central Powers, declared the independence of the Soviet Ukrainian People's Republic as a federative republic of Soviet Russia, Law about socialization of land adopted by the 3rd All-Russian Congress of Soviets, "About state system", decrees on 8-hour work day and labor control, organization of the Workers-Peasant Red Army of Ukraine. The policy of the Central Council of Ukraine in the resolution "About political moment" was condemned requesting withdrawal of the Austrian and German Armed Forces from Ukraine. Participants elected the new composition of the Central Executive Committee of Ukraine of 102 members headed by Vladimir Zatonsky.

=== Second Congress (Katerynoslav) ===
The Second All-Ukrainian Congress of Soviets took place in Katerynoslav.

=== Transformation ===
The Congress ceased to exist at the end of the constitutional reform of 1936–1937, when the first on the union and then at the republican levels indirect election to Soviets were replaced by direct elections at all levels with the Supreme Soviet as the highest body.

== List of all congresses ==
Order	Date	Location	Main events	Delegates
I (not bolshevik-controlled)	December 17–19 [O.S. December 4–6], 1917	Kyiv	Adaption of the Central Council of Ukraine as the supreme authority Mykhailo Hrushevsky (Chairman of the Central Council of Ukraine)	2,000–2,500
I (bolshevik-controlled)	December 24–25 [O.S. December 11–12], 1917	Kharkiv	Proclamation of the Soviet power, establishing of Ukraine as a federative entity of the Russian SFSR, creation of the People's Secretariat, called on people of Ukraine to fight against the national-bourgeois Central Council of Ukraine Yukhym Medvedev (Chairman of the Central Executive Committee)	<200
II	March 17–19, 1918	Katerynoslav	Approved the Soviet Treaty of Brest-Litovsk and only formally breaks the federative union with Russia Decided to create the Red Army and will fight against the restored bourgeois power, adopted "temporary provisions on socialization of land" Volodymyr Zatonsky (Chairman of the Central Executive Committee)	964
III	March 6–10, 1919	Kharkiv	Reformed the government body of Ukraine, approved the decision to create regular Red Army, policies of the People's Commissariat of Food supply and war communism, adaptation of the first Constitution of the Ukrainian SSR Grigory Petrovsky (Chairman of the Central Executive Committee)	1,719
IV	May 16–20, 1920	Kharkiv	Polish–Soviet War Committees of Poor Peasants; Election of 34 members to the All-Russian Central Executive Committee	811
V	February 25 – March 3, 1921	Kharkiv	Ratification of the 1920 Union Workers-Peasant Treaty between Soviet Ukraine and Soviet Russia, Adopted resolutions on revival of coal and metallurgical industries, electrification, improving land use Established the Order of the Red Banner of Labor (the only order of Soviet Ukraine)	841
VI	December 14–17, 1921	Kharkiv	Prodnalog, grain fund for poor peasants and the 1922 sowing campaign New Economic Policy; Election of 254 delegates to the 9th Congress of Soviets of the Russian SFSR	820
VII	December 10–14, 1922	Kharkiv	Declaration on creation of the Soviet Union Election of delegates to the 10th Congress of Soviets of the Russian SFSR	785
VIII	January 17–20, 1924	Kharkiv		
IX	May 3–10, 1925	Kharkiv	Amendments to the Constitution in correspondence with the 1924 Soviet Constitution	838
X	April 6–13, 1927	Kharkiv		1,059
XI	May 7–15, 1929	Kharkiv	Adaptation of the Constitution of the Ukrainian SSR as member of the Soviet Union	893
XII	February 25 – March 4, 1931	Kharkiv		
XIII	January 15–22, 1935	Kyiv		
XIV (extraordinary)	January 25–31, 1937	Kyiv	Transformation of the Congress of Soviets and the Central Executive Committee into the Supreme Soviet and Presidium of the Supreme Soviet respectively Adaptation of the Stalinist edition of the Constitution of the Ukrainian SSR	

== Election ==
According to article 24 of the 1929 Constitution, the Congress was composed by delegates from the All-Modavian Congress of Soviets and the Congresses of Soviets of the Okruhas. For every 10,000 voters in cities and urban-type settlements and every 50,000 inhabitants of rural council areas, one delegate should be elected.

== Powers ==
The exclusive jurisdiction of the Congress consisted of:

- Election of the Central Executive Committee of Ukraine
- Adoption of the Constitution of the Ukrainian SSR and amendments to it.
- Approval of amendments proposed by the Central Executive Committee
- Approval of constitutions of the autonomous republics of Ukraine

On the other issues the Congress and Central Executive Committee had the same authority.

== See also ==
- Verkhovna Rada
- Congress of Soviets

== Bibliography ==
- Khmil, I.V., Shatalina, Ye.P., Hrytsenko, A.P., Boiko, O.D., Yefimenko, H.H. Encyclopedia of Ukraine. Vol.1. "Naukova dumka" (Scientific Thought). Kyiv, 2003.
- History of state and law of Ukrainian SSR. Vol.2. "Naukova dumka" (Scientific Thought). Kyiv, 1987.
- Honcharenko, V.D. All-Ukrainian Congress of Soviets of Workers', Peasants', and Red-Armymen Deputies - the Supreme body of authority of the Ukrainian SSR in 1917-37 . Educational and Methodical Compilation of Higher Education. Kyiv, 1990.
