= Panas Liubchenko =

Ukrainian revolutionary and Soviet politician (1897–1937)

- Панас Любченко
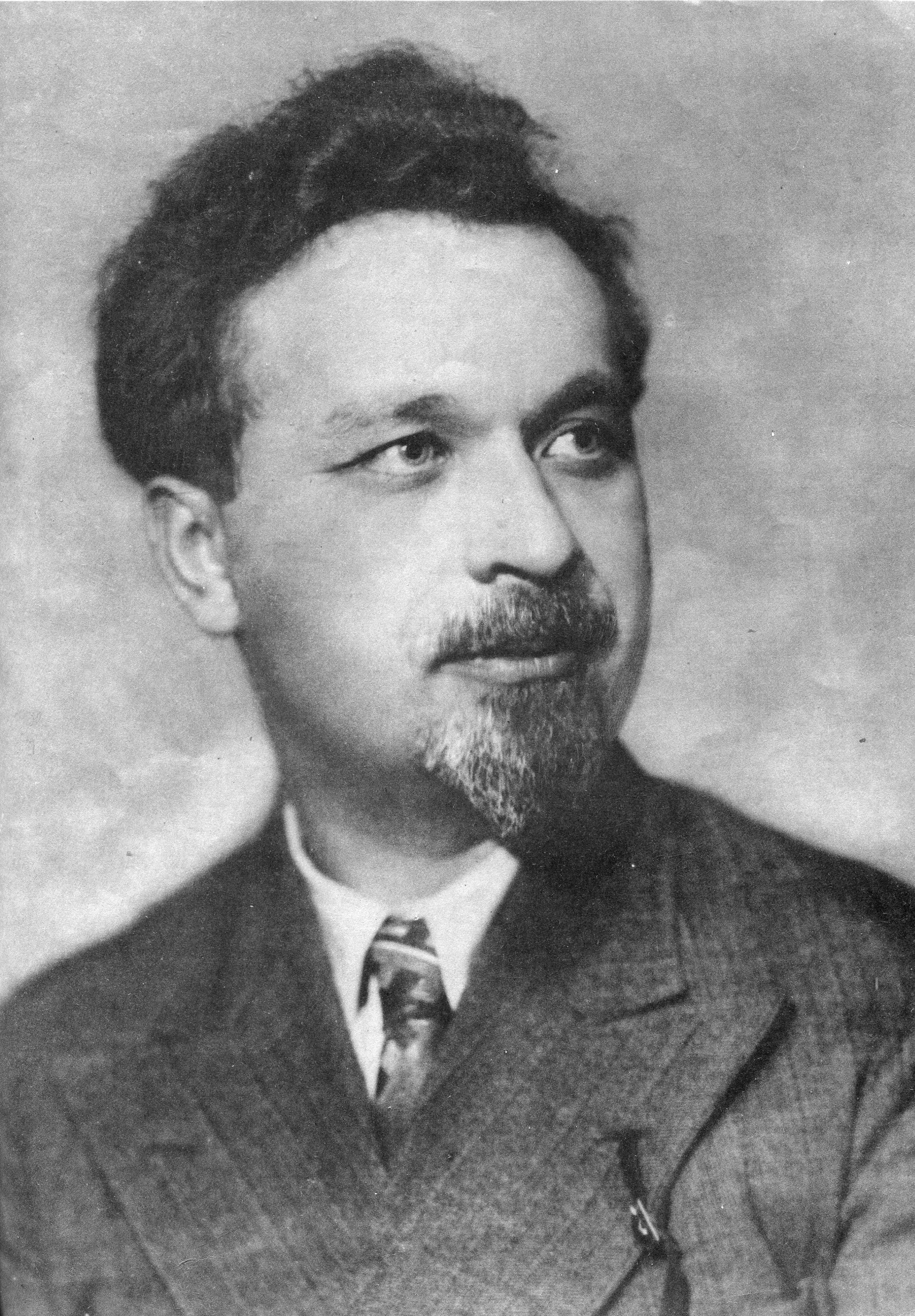
- Liubchenko in January 1937

3rd Chairman of the Council of People's Commissars of the Ukrainian SSR
- In office 28 April 1934 – 30 August 1937
- Preceded by: Vlas Chubar
- Succeeded by: Mykhailo Bondarenko

Personal details
- Born: 14 January 1897 Kaharlyk, Russian Empire
- Died: 30 August 1937 (aged 40) Kyiv, Ukrainian SSR, Soviet Union
- Party: Socialist Revolutionary Party (1913–1917); USRP (1917–1919); Borotbists (1918–1920); Communist Party (Bolsheviks) of Ukraine (1920–1937); All-Union Communist Party (Bolsheviks) (1920–1937)
- Education: Kiev Military Nursing School
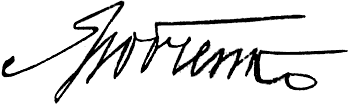
- Signature

Military service
- Allegiance: Russian Empire
- Branch/service: Imperial Russian Army
- Unit: Southwestern Front
- Battles/wars: World War I

Panas Petrovych Liubchenko (Ukrainian: Панас Петрович Любченко; 2 January [O.S. 14 January] 1897 – 30 August 1937) was a Ukrainian revolutionary and Soviet politician who served as Chairman of the Council of People's Commissars of the Ukrainian Soviet Socialist Republic from 1934 until his 1937 suicide amidst the Great Purge. He was one of the leaders of the Borotbists during the Ukrainian War of Independence.

== Early life, political career in independent Ukraine ==
Panas Petrovych Liubchenko was born on 14 January 1897 (2 January according to the Julian calendar) in Kaharlyk, then part of the Russian Empire, to a family of peasants. He left school in second grade, later studying at the Kiev Military Nursing School from 1909. Liubchenko entered politics as an activist for the Socialist Revolutionary Party in 1913. He was a soldier in the Southwestern Front during World War I, being wounded twice. He became a journalist in 1916, writing in the periodicals Socialist Thought and Our Word.

Following the 1917 February Revolution Liubchenko joined the Ukrainian Socialist-Revolutionary Party, also becoming a member of the Central Rada and the Kyiv soviet. During this time he was associated with the internationalist faction of the USRP; the faction later split off to form the Borotbists in March 1919, and Liubchenko was one of their leaders following the split. Liubchenko opposed Pavlo Skoropadskyi, who became leader of Ukraine following the 1918 Ukrainian coup d'état, and was a member of an underground cell of Borotbists in Kyiv. From February to August 1919 he was a member of the Borotbists' Kiev Governorate Executive Committee. Along with all other Borotbists, Liubchenko joined the Communist Party (Bolsheviks) of Ukraine in 1920.

== Soviet political career ==
Throughout the 1920s, Liubchenko served as head of various governorates' executive committees, including the Kiev, Chernigov and Donets governorates. He was president of the All-Ukrainian Association of Agricultural Co-operatives from 1922 to 1925, and became a secretary of the Central Committee of the Communist Party of Ukraine in 1927, dealing with cultural affairs; he later became a full member of the KP(B)U's Politburo in 1934. He became Chairman of the Council of People's Commissars of the Ukrainian SSR on 28 April of the same year.

Liubchenko, along with Vlas Chubar and Grigory Petrovsky, was among the moderate national communists and supporters of Ukrainianisation who held high positions in Ukraine during the interwar period. Liubchenko, Chubar and Petrovsky represented a middle ground between more active supporters of Ukrainianisation (namely Mykola Skrypnyk and Panas Butsenko) and those who felt minimal pride for Ukraine (such as First Secretary Stanisław Kosior, Lazar Kaganovich, Yukhym Medvediev and Pavel Postyshev). Liubchenko represented the All-Ukrainian Council of Trade Unions during the Union for the Freedom of Ukraine trial, acting as a "people's prosecutor".

Liubchenko has been accused by history writer Ihor Bihun of culpability in the Holodomor by intentionally implementing disproportionate quotas for grain production. Along with Kosior and Skrypnyk, Liubchenko publicly confronted Kaganovich and Vyacheslav Molotov at the Third All-Ukrainian Party Conference in 1932 over the quota's size, resulting in the quota being reduced by 1.1 million tonnes.

Liubchenko denounced Skrypnyk in 1933, sending a series of letters to Kaganovich, Molotov and Joseph Stalin accusing him of association with Ukrainian nationalists; Stalin later publicly repeated these claims. During the last years of his life he lived at the Mezhyhirya Residence along with Kosior and Vsevolod Balitsky.

== Death ==
At a 1937 plenum of the Communist Party of Ukraine, Kosior accused the Borotbists of bourgeois nationalism. In particular, Liubchenko was criticised for having led them. Recognising that he would soon be purged, Liubchenko shot his wife and committed suicide during a break in the plenum on 30 August 1937.

Liubchenko was rehabilitated after the death of Joseph Stalin; sources dispute whether the year of his rehabilitation was 1956 or the early 1960s. Petro Shelest, First Secretary of the Communist Party of Ukraine, was the author of a 1965 petition to posthumously reinstate Liubchenko's party membership.

Political offices
| Preceded by Vlas Chubar | Chairman of the Council of People's Commissars of Ukraine (Ukrainian SSR); 1934–1937 | Succeeded by Mykhailo Bondarenko |
