= Central Committee of the 2nd Congress of the Communist Party (Bolsheviks) of Ukraine =

Central Committee of the 2nd Congress

22 October 1918 – 1 March 1919
- Responsible Secretary: Emanuel Kviring
- Inner-groups: Secretariat: 1 member

Candidates

The Central Committee (CC) composition was elected by the 2nd Congress, and sat from 22 October 1918 until 1 March 1919. The CC 1st Plenary Session elected the Secretary of the Central Committee of the Communist Party (Bolsheviks) of Ukraine Emanuel Kviring.

== Plenary sessions ==
Plenary sessions of the Central Committee
Plenum	Date	Length
1st Plenary Session	23-26 October 1918	4 days

== Composition ==
=== Members ===
Members of the Central Committee of the 1st Congress of the Communist Party (Bolsheviks) of Ukraine
Name	Cyrillic	1st CC	3rd CC	Birth	Death	PM	Nationality	Gender	Portrait
Fyodor Sergeyev	Фёдор Сергеев	New	Not	1883	1921	1902	Russian	Male	
Nikolay Bestchetvertnoi	Николай Бесчетверной	New	Not	1895	1937	1915	Russian	Male	
Shulim Gruzman	Шулим Грузман	Old	Died	unknown	1919	1912	Ukrainian Jew	Male	
Yakov Drobnis	Яков Дробнис	New	Reelected	1890	1937	1905	Ukrainian	Male	
Samuil Zaks	Самуил Закс	New	Not	1884	1937	1906	Russian Jew	Male	
Vladimir Zatonsky	Владимир Затонский	Old	Reelected	1888	1938	1905	Ukrainian	Male	
Aleksandr Zimak	Александр Зимак	New	Died	1889	1918	1906	Russian	Male	
Emanuel Kviring	Эммануил Квиринг	Old	Reelected	1888	1937	1912	Volga German	Male	
Georgy Pyatakov	Георгий Пятаков	Old	Reelected	1890	1937	1910	Ukrainian	Male	
Mikhail Reut	Михаил Реут	New	Not	1882	1937	1903	Ukrainian	Male	
Pyotr Slynko	Пётр Слинько	Candidate	Not	1895	1919	1918	Ukrainian	Male	
Joseph Stalin	Иосиф Сталин	New	Not	1879	1953	1898	Georgian	Male	
Leonid Tarsky	Леонид Тарский	Old	Candidate	1894	1938	1917	Ukrainian Jew	Male	
Isaak Shvarts	Исаак Шварц	Old	Not	1879	1951	1899	Ukrainian Jew	Male	
Yakov Yakovlev	Я́ков Я́ковлев	Candidate	Not	1896	1938	1913	Belarusian Jew	Male	

=== Candidates ===
Candidate Members of the Central Committee of the 1st Congress of the Communist Party (Bolsheviks) of Ukraine
Name	Cyrillic	1st CC	3rd CC	Birth	Death	PM	Nationality	Gender	Portrait
Ivan Amosov	Иван Амосов	Member	Not	1880	1938	1912	Ukrainian	Male	
Andrey Bliznichenko	Андрей Близниченко	New	Not	1888	1937	1912	Ukrainian	Male	
Naum Vinokurov	Наум Винокуров	New	Not	1888	1938	1905	Ukrainian Jew	Male	
Yan Gamarnik	Я́ков Гама́рник	Candidate	Member	1894	1937	1916	Ukrainian Jew	Male	
Fyodor Zharko	Фёдор Жарко	New	Candidate	1894	1937	1912	Ukrainian	Male	
Fyodor Zolotov	Фёдор Золотов	New	Not	1895	1938	1914	Ukrainian	Male	
Vladimir Klochko	Владимир Клочко	New	Died	1898	1918	1913	Belarusian	Male	
Stanislav Kosior	Станисла́в Косио́р	Member	Member	1889	1939	1907	Polish	Male	
Aleksandr Lugovoy	Александр Луговой	New	Not	1893	1937	1913	Russian Jew	Male	
Aleksei Rusin	Алексей Русин	New	Not	1889	1962	1917	Russian	Male	
Pinkhus Rovner	Пинкус Ровнер	Member	Member	1875	1919	1902	Ukrainian Jew	Male	
Nikolay Skrypnik	Николай Скрыпник	Candidate	Not	1872	1933	1898	Ukrainian	Male	
Lazar Smolyakov	Лазарь Смоляков	New	Not	1897	1920	1913	Belarusian Jew	Male	
Taras Kharechko	Тарас Харечко	New	Member	1893	1937	1914	Ukrainian	Male	
B. Chernysh	Б. Черныш	New	Not	—	—	—	—	Male	

== See also ==
- Central Committee of the 7th Congress of the Russian Communist Party (Bolsheviks)
