= Eleventh All-Ukrainian Congress of Soviets =

1929 congress

The Eleventh All-Ukrainian Congress of Soviets (Ukrainian: Всеукраїнський з'їзд Рад) was a congress of Soviets (councils) of workers, peasants, Red-army-men deputies that took place in Kharkiv on May 7 - 15, 1929.

== Composition ==
There were 1333 delegates out which 893 had the right to vote. Among the delegates there were 937 Communists.

== Agenda ==
- Report of government of the Ukrainian SSR
- Report of government of the Soviet Union
- Report about the Five-Year plan development of national economy of Ukraine
- Adoption of the Constitution of the Ukrainian SSR
- Report on situation and perspectives on culture development
- Others

== Decisions ==
- Completely approved the work of government of the Ukrainian SSR (Chubar Government) and the Soviet Union
  - including measures in regards to industrialization of the country,
  - noted great achievements in development of industry.
- Reviewed and approved the Five-Year plan development of national economy of Ukraine
- Unanimously adopted the Constitution of the Ukrainian SSR in new edition that reflected significant changes which occurred in the republic since the time of adoption of the 1919 Constitution of the Ukrainian SSR and were caused by creation of the Soviet Union

It elected the new All-Ukrainian Central Executive Committee consisting of 315 members and 110 candidates as well as representatives of the Ukrainian SSR to the Council of Nationalities of the Central Executive Committee of the Soviet Union including 5 members and 2 candidates.
