= 1921–1923 famine in Ukraine =

Humanitarian crisis

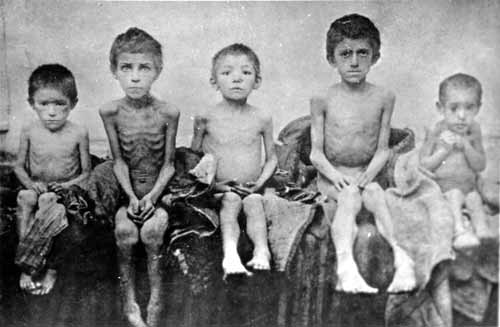
Children affected by famine in Berdyansk, Ukraine, in 1922

The 1921–1923 famine in Ukraine was a disaster that mostly occurred in the southern steppe region of Ukraine. The number of fatalities is estimated between 200,000 and 1,000,000, but no systematic records were then made.

Among researchers who describe the famine of 1921–1923 as genocide are Wasyl Veryha and Roman Serbyn.

== Causes ==
Famines regularly occurred under the Russian Empire such as the famine of 1891–1892, but the Ukrainian fertile agricultural zone, especially its southern region, usually had enough food because of the high fertility of its black soil, chernozem. However, between 1918 and 1920, the Germans, the White Army, and the Red Army militants continuously tried to seize food from peasants. In 1919, a food tax was established by the Russian communist authorities, which disincentivized food production by peasants.

During the summer of 1921, the southern regions of the European part of Soviet Russia were suffering from severe drought and starvation, which began in the Volga Valley, the North Caucasus, and Ukraine. The Moscow government recognized the Russian famine of 1921–1922 (Volga food crisis) but paid no attention to Ukraine. Moreover, Vladimir Lenin ordered to move trains full of grain from Ukraine to the Volga region, Moscow, and Petrograd to combat starvation there, and 1,127 trains were sent between the fall of 1921 and August 1922.

Soviet leaders acknowledged the famine in southern Ukraine only in December 1921, and it was still a sensation when they met delegates in Kharkiv in February 1922.

== Relief ==
International relief organizations acting in the Volga region began in August 1921, but the Soviet government in Ukraine started seeking their help only in January 1922, when many people were already starving. The American Relief Administration opened its office in Kyiv, after Lincoln Hutchinson's trip by car in late December 1921 to January 1922 to Odesa, Mykolaiv, and Zaporizhzhia. Offices in Odesa and Mykolaiv were opened in late March 1922.

The communist Workers International Relief did not start functioning until November 1922 in Ukraine. The Nansen Mission started actual work in Ukraine in May 1922, with Vidkun Quisling as the head of the Kharkiv office. Quisling prepared a map that showed the intensity of the famine in southern and eastern Ukraine in April 1922. Most offices continued their work until the summer of 1923, as the situation in Ukraine was still rougher than the mostly-recovered Volga region.

== Historiography ==
A considerable historiographical debate about whether this failure to address the famine in Ukraine was deliberate still occurs. Vladimir Lenin and other Russian Bolshevik leaders made a number of statements that insisted that Ukraine should be conquered because Russian communists needed grain, and Ukrainian peasant households were the enemies of the Soviet regime because they resisted grain requisitions. Thus, a certain level of hostility between the Russian communists and the Ukrainian peasantry was established.

Differences in attitudes towards Russian and Ukrainian peasants could have been based on their perceived loyalty: the Volga region was seen as loyal, but Ukrainians were treated as "peasant bandits." To seize grain in the Mykolaiv region, the military was ordered to take hostages from local families. Critics of the theory point out that no decrees or other strategic documents directly prescribing the elimination of the Ukrainian peasantry were found.

Among researchers who describe the famine of 1921–1923 as genocide are Wasyl Veryha and Roman Serbyn.

== See also ==
- Bibliography of Ukrainian history
- Outline of Ukrainian history
- Collectivization in the Ukrainian Soviet Socialist Republic
- Dekulakization
- Droughts and famines in Russia and the Soviet Union
- Excess mortality in the Soviet Union under Joseph Stalin
- Holodomor
- Seventh All-Ukrainian Congress of Soviets

== Literature ==
- Сергійчук В. Петлюра кричав про голод в Україні, а Ленін забирав звідси хліб: [Стаття з архів. документами періоду 1921—1922 рр.] // Освіта. — 1996. — 6 листоп. — С. 6.
- Україна в ХХ столітті: Зб. документів і матеріалів: (1900—1939) /Ін-т змісту і методів навчання; Київський нац. ун-т ім. Т. Шевченка; Упоряд.: А. Г. Слюсаренко та ін. — К. : Вища школа, 2000. — 351 с.
