= Central Committee of the 1st Congress of the Communist Party (Bolsheviks) of Ukraine =

Central Committee of the 1st Congress

12 July 1918 – 17 October 1918
- Responsible Secretary: Yuriy Pyatakov; Serafima Gopner (9.9.1918)
- Inner-groups: Secretariat: 1 member

Candidates

The Central Committee (CC) composition was elected by the 1st Congress, and sat from 12 July 1918 until 17 October 1918. The CC 1st Plenary Session elected the Secretary of the Central Committee of the Communist Party (Bolsheviks) of Ukraine Georgy Pyatakov. The CC 2nd Plenary Session elected the Secretary of the Central Committee of the Communist Party (Bolsheviks) of Ukraine Serafima Gopner.

== Plenary sessions ==
Plenary sessions of the Central Committee
Plenum	Date	Length
1st Plenary Session	12 July 1918	1 day
2nd Plenary Session	8-9 September 1918	2 days
3rd Plenary Session	16 October 1918	1 day

== Composition ==
=== Members ===
Members of the Central Committee of the 1st Congress of the Communist Party (Bolsheviks) of Ukraine
Name	Cyrillic	2nd CC	Birth	Death	PM	Nationality	Gender	Portrait
Ivan Amosov	Иван Амосов	Candidate	1880	1938	1912	Ukrainian	Male	
Andrei Bubnov	Андрей Бубнов	Not	1883	1938	1903	Russian	Male	
Afanasiy Butsenko	Афанасий Буценко	Not	1889	1965	1909	Ukrainian	Male	
Shulim Gruzman	Шулим Грузман	Reelected	unknown	1919	1912	Ukrainian Jew	Male	
Vladimir Zatonsky	Владимир Затонский	Reelected	1888	1938	1905	Ukrainian	Male	
Lavrenty Kartvelishvili	Лаврентий Картвелишвили	Not	1890	1938	1910	Georgian	Male	
Emanuel Kviring	Эммануил Квиринг	Reelected	1888	1937	1912	Volga German	Male	
Stanislav Kosior	Станисла́в Косио́р	Candidate	1889	1939	1907	Polish	Male	
Isaak Kreisberg	Исаа́к Кре́йсберг	Not	1898	1919	1907	Ukrainian Jew	Male	
Yury Lutovinov	Юрий Лутовинов	Not	1887	1924	1904	Ukrainian	Male	
Georgy Pyatakov	Георгий Пятаков	Reelected	1890	1937	1910	Ukrainian	Male	
Rafail Farbman	Рафаи́л Фа́рбман	Not	1893	1966	1910	Ukrainian Jew	Male	
Pinkhus Rovner	Пинкус Ровнер	Reelected	1875	1919	1902	Ukrainian Jew	Male	
Leonid Tarsky	Леонид Тарский	Reelected	1894	1938	1917	Ukrainian Jew	Male	
Isaak Shvarts	Исаак Шварц	Reelected	1879	1951	1899	Ukrainian Jew	Male	

=== Candidates ===
Candidate Members of the Central Committee of the 1st Congress of the Communist Party (Bolsheviks) of Ukraine
Name	Cyrillic	2nd CC	Birth	Death	PM	Nationality	Gender	Portrait
Yan Gamarnik	Я́ков Гама́рник	Candidate	1894	1937	1916	Ukrainian Jew	Male	
Dmitry Lebed	Дмитрий Лебедь	Not	1893	1937	1909	Ukrainian	Male	
Mikhail Mayorov	Михаил Майоров	Not	1890	1938	1906	Belarusian Jew	Male	
Nikolay Skrypnik	Николай Скрыпник	Candidate	1872	1933	1898	Ukrainian	Male	
Pyotr Slynko	Пётр Слинько	Member	1895	1919	1918	Ukrainian	Male	
Yakov Yakovlev	Я́ков Я́ковлев	Member	1896	1938	1913	Belarusian Jew	Male	
