= Vlas Chubar =

Ukrainian revolutionary and Soviet politician (1891–1939)

- Влас Чубарь
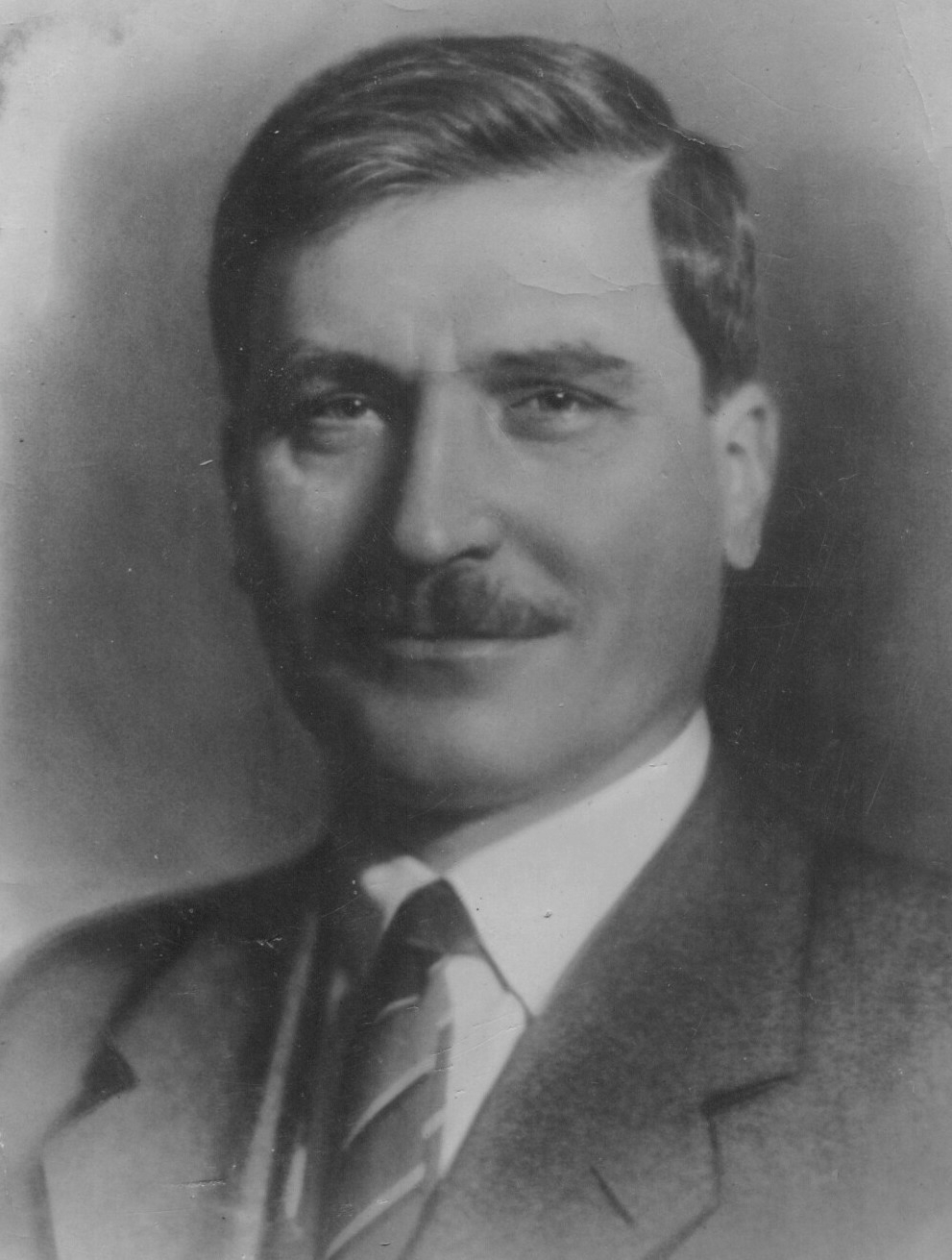
- Chubar in 1938

People's Commissar for Finance
- In office 16 August 1937 – 19 January 1938
- Premier: Vyacheslav Molotov
- Preceded by: Hryhoriy Hrynko
- Succeeded by: Arseny Zverev

2nd Chairman of the Council of People's Commissars of the Ukrainian SSR
- In office 15 July 1923 – 28 April 1934
- Premier: Alexey Rykov
- Preceded by: Christian Rakovsky
- Succeeded by: Panas Lyubchenko

Candidate member of the 14th, 15th, 16th, 17th Politburo
- In office 3 November 1926 – 1 February 1935

Personal details
- Born: Vlas Yakovlevich Chubar; 10 February 1891 Fedorivka, Yekaterinoslav Governorate, Russian Empire (now Ukraine)
- Died: 26 February 1939 (aged 48) Moscow, Soviet Union
- Party: RSDLP (Bolsheviks) (1907–1918); Russian Communist Party (1918–1920); Communist Party (Bolsheviks) of Ukraine (1920-1938)
- Education: Alexander Mechanics and Technical College
- Profession: Economist

Vlas Yakovlevich Chubar (Russian: Влас Яковлевич Чубарь, Ukrainian: Влас Якович Чубар; 22 February [O.S. 10 February] 1891 – 26 February 1939) was a Ukrainian Bolshevik revolutionary and a Soviet politician. Chubar was arrested during the Great Terror of 1937–1938 and executed early in 1939.

The top Communist Party official in Ukraine during the 1932–1933 famine, Chubar was posthumously held culpable for those events by a Ukrainian court in 2010.

== Early career ==
Chubar was from an ethnic Ukrainian peasant family. He was born in Fedorіvka, Yekaterinoslav Governorate, Russian Empire (now in Polohy Raion, Zaporizhzhia Oblast, Ukraine). His parents were illiterate peasants who owned a small plot of land.

He was arrested and beaten by gendarmes for belonging to a revolutionary group when he was 13 years old. After leaving school, he worked as a roofer. Chubar became a Marxist revolutionary during the 1905 revolution and joined the Bolshevik faction of the Russian Social Democratic Labor Party in 1907. He was a senior figure in Vesenkha in Moscow, and the Urals, in 1918–20.

Chubar returned to Ukraine in 1920, where he held a succession of economic posts, including running the Don basin coal combine in 1922–23. He was a member of the Central Committee of the Communist Party of Ukraine in 1920–36, and of its Politburo. In 1922, Chubar was elected a member of the Central Committee of the Soviet Communist Party. On July 13, 1923, Chubar replaced Christian Rakovsky as Chairman of the Ukrainian Sovnarkom. The government headed by Vlas Chubar was approved by the Eighth (1924) and the Tenth (1927) All-Ukrainian congresses of Soviets.

In the early 1920s, Chubar tried to resist allowing Ukraine to be controlled from Moscow. In 1920, he objected to the appointment of a Russian, Vyacheslav Molotov, as secretary of the Ukrainian communist party, claiming that he knew very little about conditions in Ukraine. Molotov was recalled after a year. In 1925, he objected to the appointment of Lazar Kaganovich who, like Molotov, was a trusted ally of Joseph Stalin, as First Secretary of the Ukrainian party. When their relations reached the breaking point in 1928 Stalin recalled Kaganovich, whose replacement, Stanisław Kosior, was much more acceptable to Chubar and other Ukrainian leaders.

Chubar became a candidate (non-voting) member of the Central Committee's Politburo in November 1926 – the first, and for many years the only ethnic Ukrainian to reach this level. He supported Stalin in the struggle against Leon Trotsky in the 1920s and made an "ugly speech" attacking Trotsky and others at the Central Committee session in October 1927 which resolved to expel them from the communist party.

== Holodomor ==
Chubar originally backed Stalin's decision to force peasant farmers to join collective farms. He was one of the speakers at a crucial session of the Central Committee in November 1929 who attacked Nikolai Bukharin and others who opposed forced collectivisation. In March 1930, he reported that 63 per cent of peasant households in Ukraine had been collectivised. On 1 February 1932, despite evidence that the policy was creating a catastrophic fall in agricultural output and mass starvation, Chubar and Kosior co-signed an order, “On Seed”, ordering regional, city and district party committees to deny any seed aid to Ukraine's collective farms. This was the first of three documents bearing this signature from which the Kyiv Court of Appeal reached its verdict that Chubar was complicit in genocide.

Chubar saw the impact of collectivisation for himself when he visited the countryside. On 10 June, he wrote to Stalin and Molotov on 10 June warning that "in March and April there were tens of thousands of malnourished, starving and swollen people dying from famine in every village." A few days later, with the backing of the Ukrainian Politburo, he sent a telegram to Moscow pleading for thousands of tons of grain to be sent to Ukraine. Stalin's response was that "Chubar is mistaken ... Ukraine has been given more than it should get. There is no reason to give more grain, and nowhere to take it from."

His pleas for more grain angered Stalin, who gave Kaganovich and Molotov a written instruction on 2 July to go to Ukraine to deal with "Chubar's corruptness and opportunism" and hinted that both Chubar and Kosior would be removed from Ukraine. The Ukrainian Politburo met on 6 July. Kaganovich reported to Stalin that every member of the Politburo pleaded for a reduction in the quota of grain Ukraine was supposed to hand over, but he and Molotov "categorically refused". In Pravda, the following day, Chubar was quoted as having criticised heads of collective farms and other officials who accepted targets they knew could not be fulfilled, saying "it is wrong to accept an order regardless of its practicability" and then to justify the resulting chaos by saying it came from "orders from above". Yet, after the Politburo session, Chubar and Kosior signed a decree “On grain procurements quota”, and arranged for the collective farms to be set a wildly unrealistic target of delivering 356 million pood of grain. This was the second piece of evidence cited by the 2010 court judgement against Chubar.

In December, Chubar had another clash with Kaganovich, who complained that fines imposed on peasants who failed to deliver their quota of grain were not being collected. Chubar argued "weakly" that the peasants were so poor they had nothing that could be confiscated and sold. Overruled, he signed an order that penalised three entire regions – Chernihiv, Kyiv and Vinnytsia – that were accused of "maliciously" failing to fulfill their quotas by prohibiting the sale of potatoes, which inevitably caused starvation, which the 2010 court verdict described as "murder by famine" of Ukrainian peasants. Assessing his role in Holodomor, the historian Robert Conquest wrote: "Chubar, who had expressed doubt, or rather certainty that Moscow's policies would lead to disaster, nevertheless enforced them."

== The Great Purge ==
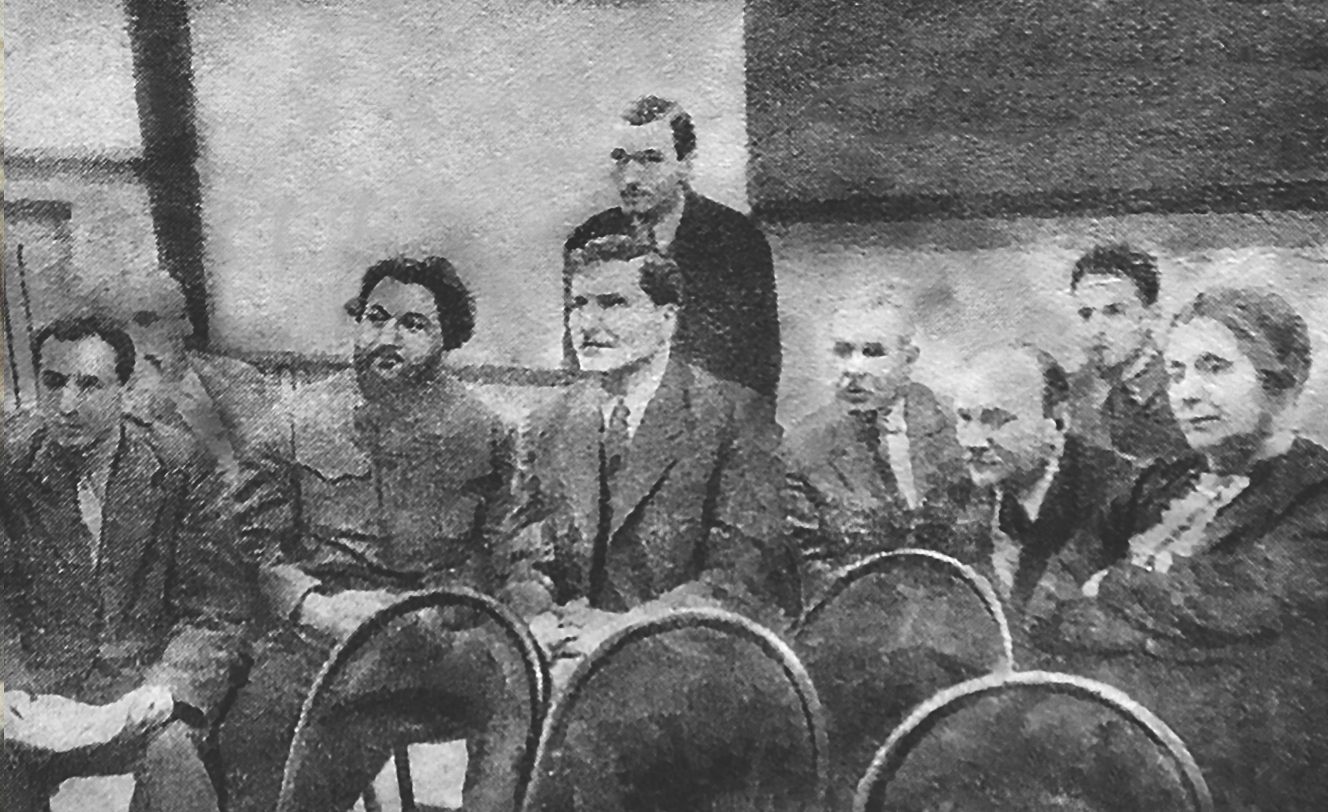
Vlas Chubar (center) and Artemic Khalatov (second from left) 1936

In 1934 Chubar was transferred to Moscow. Though this was because Stalin no longer trusted him, he was appointed to a senior post as Deputy Chairman of the USSR Council of People's Commissars and Deputy Chairman of the USSR Council of Labor and Defense. In February 1935 Chubar was made a full member of the Politburo. He briefly served as the Soviet People's Commissar of Finance between August 16, 1937, and January 19, 1938.

He supported Stalin loyally in the early stages of the Great Purge. During the Central Committee plenum in February 1937 which sanctioned the arrest of Bukharin and other former opponents of collectivisation, Chubar made an inflammatory speech accusing them of "open counter-revolution", and calling Bukharin a "snake", and alleging that Trotsky and his supporters were "agents of fascism".

This did not save him. In 1938 Chubar was appointed the chief of the Solikamsk construction for the GULAG of Soviet Commissariat of Interior and there he was arrested in June 1938. In 1956, the head of the communist party, Nikita Khrushchev, told delegates to the 20th Party Congress that Chubar's case had been handed to the notorious torturer Boris Rodos, who had orders to force a confession out of him. The head of the NKVD, Lavrenty Beria, also arranged a confrontation in his office with Chubar's former colleague and neighbour, Nikolai Antipov, who had broken under interrogation and had testified against Chubar, who exclaimed: "I cherished this snake next to my heart. Provocateur!" Molotov justified Chubar's arrest, years afterwards, by claiming "He was with the rightists; we all knew it, we sensed it".

Chubar was executed in February 1939. The Soviet government cleared Chubar of all charges during the first wave of destalinization in 1955.

== See also ==
- Chubarivka, the former name of several Ukrainian settlements named after Chubar

Political offices
Preceded by Hryhoriy Hrynko	People's Commissar of Finance of the USSR; 1937 – 1938	Succeeded by Arseny Zverev
