= Yukhym =

Yukhym (Ukrainian: Юхим), is a Ukrainian masculine given name. Notable people with the name include:

- Yukhym Konoplya (born 1999), Ukrainian footballer
- Yukhym Medvedev (1886–1938), Ukrainian Soviet politician
- Yukhym Shkolnykov (1939–2009), Ukrainian footballer and coach
- Yukhym Zvyahilsky (1933–2021), Ukrainian politician
