= Ninth All-Ukrainian Congress of Soviets =

1925 congress

The Ninth All-Ukrainian Congress of Soviets (Ukrainian: Всеукраїнський з'їзд Рад) was a congress of Soviets (councils) of workers, peasants, Red-army-men deputies that took place in Kharkiv on May 3 - 10, 1925.

== Background events ==
On May 3, the 9th All-Ukrainian Congress of Soviets was solemnly opened in Kharkiv. The newly renovated Shevchenko Theater, the largest in the city, is filled with thousands of people. The theater cannot accommodate the entire mass of workers who want to be at the congress. Around the theater building there are thousands of workers, Red Army soldiers and students who were not lucky enough to enter the theater. "Loudspeakers" were installed on the roof of the theater, as well as on the building of the VUCVK, which broadcast everything that happens at the congress to a crowd of thousands of people. The hall of the Shevchenko Theater is beautifully decorated; The bust of Lenin standing on the stage, decorated with garlands of multi-colored electric bulbs, is especially noticeable. Dozens of red flags and posters with slogans written in Ukrainian, Russian, Polish, German, Bulgarian and Hebrew hang on the walls of the theater. The slogans speak of an invincible union of workers and peasants, of their readiness to respond to the bloody terror of the bourgeoisie and the threats of the imperialists with an even stronger union of forces and an even greater union of the will of the workers in order to finish the colossal task of rebuilding the whole world. Among the congress delegates there are many peasant women and workers who came from distant cities of Ukraine to participate in the work of the All-Ukrainian Parliament. In the diplomatic box there are representatives of foreign missions in Kharkiv; they are watching the congress and its participants with intense attention and interest. Exactly at 5 p.m. head of the VUCVK, T. Petrovskyi, to the thunderous applause of the entire hall, declares the 9th All-Ukrainian Congress of Soviets open. All delegates stand up from their seats and give Comrade Petrovsky a thunderous ovation.

== Composition ==
There were 838 delegates. Among the delegates 624 were Communists.

== Agenda ==
- Report of government of the Soviet Union
- Report of government of the Ukrainian SSR
- About strengthening and upturn of agriculture
- Report about agriculture and land use
- About situation and prospective of development of industry in Ukraine
- About Red Army
- About transitioning to a three-tier administrative system

=== Hryhoriy Petrovskyi speech ===
Opening our 9th Congress of Soviets today, we must recall the circumstances under which the 8th All-Ukrainian Congress took place. It was a year and a half ago, when we still had hope that Lenin would recover. This hope did not come true: Lenin died. (The whole hall stands up. The workers perform the Lenin's testaments.)

But we must say that in the year and a half after Lenin's death, we have done a lot to implement his will. The union of workers and peasants is getting stronger, there are reasons to believe that we will soon turn into reality all those forms of union of workers and peasants that Comrade Lenin talked about and dreamed of. We fulfilled, and keep on fulfilling all other testaments of Lenin, we can confidently say that the memory of this Great Teacher of humanity will never die among us. (In extreme silence, the orchestra performs a mournful march; the choir of the orphanage named after VUCVK performs a cantata in memory of Lenin, which makes the deepest impression on all present, including diplomats).

The national economy of Ukraine is improving. The economic condition of Ukraine has significantly improved over the past year. We are witnessing the rapid growth of the national economy, especially industry. We are on the eve of opening not only factories whose work was once interrupted, but also building new ones. And it is quite natural that, next to and with the advancement of the welfare of the working masses, their cultural needs are constantly growing. The desire of the broad masses of the population for education, for knowledge, is now so great that the government, having a limited budget, cannot yet fully satisfy.

The main focus is on agriculture. Unfortunately, before the congress, we have to state that natural disasters, again and again, impede the normal development of agriculture in Ukraine. These natural disasters cause great damage because the peasantry still uses old means of farming. In the field of work in the countryside, our next task now is to lead the peasantry to multi-field and collective land use. The government hopes to get the All-Ukrainian Congress of Councils as the highest legislative body of Ukraine. Instructions on the necessary measures that the future VUCVK and the Council of People's Commissariats should implement for the further improvement of the state of agriculture.

Our successes in the national issue. I must also note the successes achieved by the government of Ukraine in the national issue. We satisfied the wishes of the national minorities of Ukraine in the field of their national cultural and economic development. Everyone knows that we have formed a lot of national councils in Ukraine, that we have given minorities full opportunity to develop their culture. The formation of AMSRR is only part of our national policy. The further resolution of the national question, which we have begun and will continue, will show that only the power of the councils can ensure the development of national cultures (Petrovsky's words are covered by thunderous applause, which turns into an ovation).

=== Other speakers ===
Following Petrovsky, another speech titled as "The strength of the Soviet power lies in the steadfast union of the Communist Party and the workers" was given by the recently elected General Secretary of the Communist Party (bolsheviks) of Ukraine Lazar Kaganovich.

After Kaganovich, a word had the head of the All-Ukrainian council of trade unions comrade Ugarov and a member of the Ukrainian Central Commission of Poor Peasants comrade Odynets. Next, comrade Kamenev, Deputy Chairman of the Council of People's Commissars of the Soviet Union, delivered a long report on the activities of the All-Union Government.

== Presidium ==
The congress presidium consisted of 45 members.

To the presidium were elected Petrovskyi, Chubar, Kaganovych, Klymenko, Uharov, Zatonskyi, Yegorov, Lebed, Butsenko, Kudrin, Hrynko, Slynko, Remeiko, Radchenko, Vlasenko, Chernov, Lisovyk, Havrylov, Staryi and others. Among the presidium members 15 were non-partisan among which was professor Bahaliy.

As honoured members of the Congress there were elected Kalinin, Krupskaya, Stalin, Rykov, Kamenev, Frunze, Zinovyev and Lantsutsky.

At the suggestion of comrade Petrovskyi, by standing up the congress honored the memory of Vladimirov, Narimanov, Markhlevsky, Yevgenii Bosch, Atarbekov, Myasnikov and Mogilevsky.

== Decisions ==
The resolution of the congress set following tasks

- further expansion of socialist construction in the republic
- improving of the state apparatus
- strengthening the union of workers and peasants
- involving in socialist construction the working intelligentsia
- outlining measures in strengthening of the Red Army and Fleet
- amended the Constitution of the Ukrainian SSR in connection with the formation of the Soviet Union as well as the Moldavian ASSR within the Ukrainian SSR

The congress approved the Constitution of the Moldavian ASSR. It elected the All-Ukrainian Central Executive Committee consisting of 300 members and 91 candidates as well as representatives of the Ukrainian SSR to the Council of Nationalities of the Central Executive Committee of the Soviet Union.
