= Eighth All-Ukrainian Congress of Soviets =

1924 congress

Eighth All-Ukrainian Congress of Soviets (Ukrainian: Всеукраїнський з'їзд Рад) was a congress of Soviets (councils) of workers, peasants, Red-army-men deputies that took place in Kharkiv on January 17–20, 1924.

== Composition ==
No data

== Agenda ==
- Report of government of the Soviet Ukraine
- Report about the Constitution of the Soviet Union (People's Commissar of Justice and General Prosecutor Mykola Skrypnyk)
- About budged of the UkrSSR
- About situation of industry in Ukraine
- About land use
- About Red Army
- Elections to the All-Ukrainian Central Executive Committee

== Decisions ==
- (Report of government) the Congress unanimously approved the government and its activities and outlined ways of further development of national economy, culture, and education as well as increasing of the well-being of working people. The Congress instructed the government of the UkrSSR to review issue of construction of hydroelectric station on Dnieper (later known as DniproHES).
- (Report about Constitution) the Congress ratified the treaty approved by the First All-Union Congress of Soviets about creation of the Soviet Union and the Constitution accepted by the second session of the All-Union Central Executive Committee and instructed the All-Ukrainian Central Executive Committee review the Constitution of the UkrSSR in accordance with the treaty about creation of the Soviet Union and submit it for approval at the Ninth All-Ukrainian Congress of Soviets.
- strengthening of state budget
- further development of industry and agriculture
- streamlining land use regulations
- underlined necessity in further strengthening of the Red Army and Fleet
- other
