= Grigory Petrovsky =

Soviet Ukrainian politician (1878–1958)

- Григорій Петровський
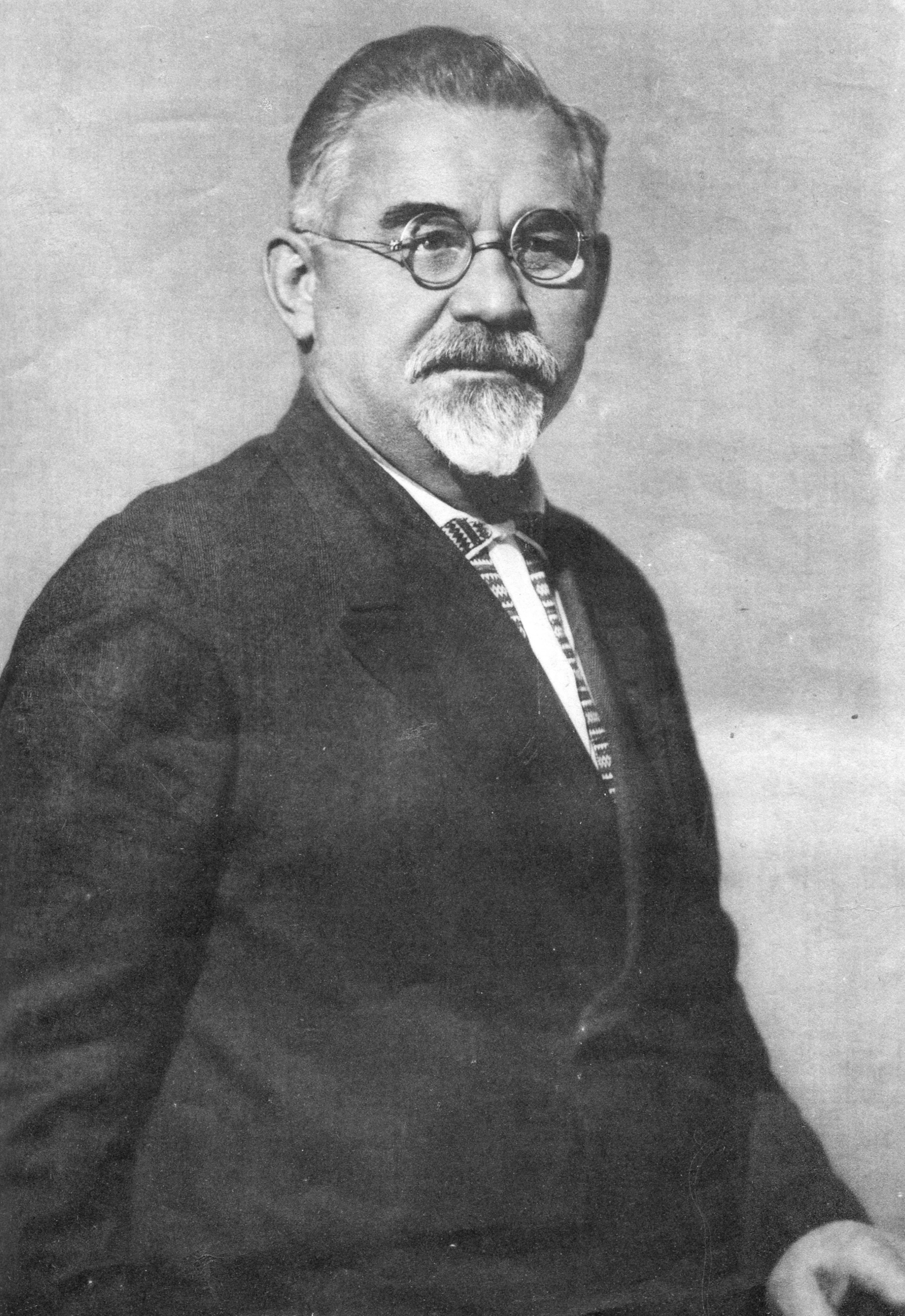
- Petrovsky in 1937

Chairman of Central Executive Committee of the Soviet Union (shared)
- In office 1922–1938

Chairman of VUTsVK
- In office 10 March 1919 – 25 July 1938
- Prime Minister: Christian Rakovsky; Vlas Chubar; Panas Lyubchenko; Mykhailo Bondarenko; Mykola Marchak; Demyan Korotchenko
- Preceded by: Office re-established, Volodymyr Zatonsky
- Succeeded by: Leonid Korniyets (as chairman of Presidium); Mykhailo Burmystenko (as chairman of Verkhovna Rada)

People's Commissar of the Interior of the Russian SFSR
- In office 17 November 1917 – 30 March 1919
- Prime Minister: Vladimir Lenin
- Preceded by: Alexey Rykov
- Succeeded by: Felix Dzerzhinsky

Candidate member of the 13th, 14th, 15th, 16th, 17th, 18th Politburo
- In office 1 January 1926 – 22 March 1939

Personal details
- Born: 4 February 1878 Pechenihy, Kharkov Governorate, Russian Empire
- Died: 9 January 1958 (aged 79) Moscow, Russian SFSR, Soviet Union
- Resting place: Kremlin Wall Necropolis, Moscow
- Party: RSDLP (1898–1903); RSDLP (Bolsheviks) (1903–1918); Russian Communist Party (1918–1939)
- Education: Elementary
- Awards: Order of Lenin (2); Order of the Red Banner; Order of the Red Banner of Labour (3)

Grigory Ivanovich Petrovsky (Russian: Григорий Иванович Петровский; Ukrainian: Григорій Іванович Петровський, romanized: Hryhorii Ivanovych Petrovskyi; 4 February 1878 – 10 January 1958) was a Ukrainian Soviet politician and Old Bolshevik. He participated in signing the Treaty on the Creation of the Union of Soviet Socialist Republics and the Treaty of Brest-Litovsk. Petrovsky was the head of state of Soviet Ukraine from 1919 until 1938, and one of the officials responsible for implementing Stalin's policy of collectivization.

== Biography ==
=== Early years ===
Petrovsky was born in the village of Pechenihy in Kharkov Governorate on 4 February (O. S. 23 January) 1878, in the family of a craftsman (some sources claim – son of tailor and laundrywoman). Grigory's father died when he was three. Petrovsky had two siblings.

After finishing two classes of school at the Kharkiv Theological Seminary in 1889, Petrovsky was dismissed for not being able to pay for his tuition. Being 11 years old he left education for a job in the city working for a locomotive depot. In 1893, aged 15, he arrived in Yekaterinoslav, where he found a job at the Bryansk Metallurgical Factory (today Petrovsky Factory).

In 1895 Petrovsky joined the revolutionary movement and in 1898 enrolled in the Russian Social Democratic Labour Party (RSDRP) and joined the "Union in the fight for the liberation of the worker's class" as well as the Yekaterinslav committee of RSDRP. At this period of time he actively participated in the political agitation for the Bolsheviks from Mykolaiv to Mariupol, from Donets Basin to Kharkiv, for which he was arrested in 1900 and 1903.

During the Russian Revolution of 1905, Petrovsky became one of the organizers and leaders of the Yekaterinoslav City Council of Worker's Deputies and the local Battle Strike Committee. However, he soon was forced to flee and for a brief period of time emigrated to Germany. In 1907 he returned to Mariupol, where he worked as a turning specialist and continued his revolutionary activity at the factory "Russian Providence" (today – part of Illich Steel and Iron Works).

=== Duma Deputy ===
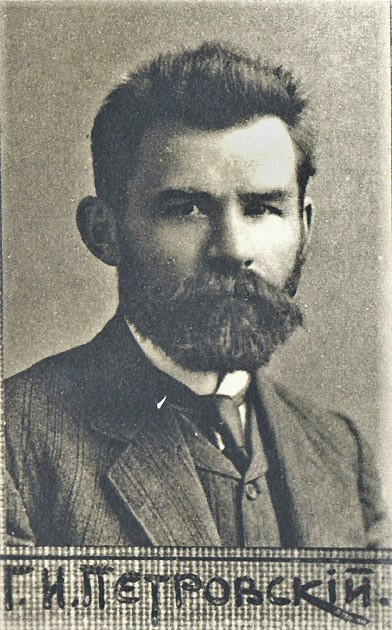
Grigory Petrovsky, 1917

In 1912, Petrovsky was elected a deputy to the Russian 4th State Duma as a representative of workers of the Yekaterinoslav Governorate for the Bolshevik faction. During this time he also was a chief editor of Pravda. In January 1913 Petrovsky was included into the Central Committee of RSDRP. It is known that in the Duma he spoke on 32 occasions, while the text of his 21st speech was prepared personally by Vladimir Lenin. In his speeches Petrovsky was addressing the issues related to improving working conditions and life of miners and workers of Donets Basin.

With the start of World War I in November 1914 he was arrested along with the other six Bolshevik members of the parliament and in February 1915 was sentenced to a lifetime exile in Turukhansky Krai (today – the northern part of Krasnoyarsk Krai).

=== People's Commissar, Ukrainian Party boss ===
After the Bolshevik seizure of power, Petrovsky was appointed People's Commissar for the Interior Affairs between 30 November 1917 and 1 March 1919. In this post he oversaw the activities of the Cheka and was one of the advocates of the Red Terror, he wrote in his order "A huge number of hostages has to be taken to the bourgeoisie, in cases of resistance these hostages have to be shot in masses (....) No hesitation in the application of the terror" He was a member of the Soviet delegation during signing the Treaty of Brest-Litovsk in 1917.

From 1919 he chaired the All-Ukrainian [from 1922, the Ukrainian SSR] Central Executive Committee, and co-chaired the USSR Central Executive Committee of the Communist Party. In January 1938 he was retired from these leading Party executive positions. Petrovsky had belonged to the party majority that opposed the Ukrainian national-communist orientation represented by Yurii Lapchynskyi and Oleksander Shumsky, but in the 1920s had nonetheless supported Ukrainization and Ukrainian economic, cultural, and political autonomy.

=== Chairman of Ukrainian SSR during collectivization ===
Some Ukrainian historians believe that Petrovsky and Lazar Kaganovich were the main executors of Stalin's 1930s policies in Ukraine, part of which was the 1932–33 man-made famine, now known as the Holodomor. According to the American Communist Fred Beal when, with Isadore Erenburg his superior in cultural-propaganda work at the prestigious Kharkov Tractor Plant, he asked Petrovsky what they were to tell their workers who were saying that "millions of peasants are dying all over Russia", Petrovsky replied:

Tell them nothing! What they say is true. We know that million are dying. That is unfortunate, but the glorious future of the Soviet Union will justify that. Tell them nothing!

Other historians, like Vasyl Marochko, a member of an official commission that investigated the Holodomor, say that when Petrovsky fully understood what was being perpetrated and realized the extent of the famine, he pleaded with Stalin to provide Ukrainians with food but this request went unheeded.

=== Survivor of the Great Terror ===
He was not purged during the Great Terror, but was shocked and saddened by the executions of close friends such as Stanisław Kosior, Vlas Chubar and Kirill Sukhomlin. Soon after the USSR celebrated its sixteenth birthday, he was interrogated by Joseph Stalin, who told him, "We shoot people like you but you will be spared" and then was excluded from the Communist Party and deprived of his dachas and apartments. After a year without a job, in 1940 he was made the director of the Revolution Museum of the USSR in Moscow. During the Second World War, after the death of his son Leonid, Petrovsky pleaded Stalin in a letter to release his imprisoned son Pyotr, but his son, who edited Leningradskaia Pravda, was shot.

According to Anton Antonov-Ovseenko in his book The Time of Stalin, Grigory Petrovsky settled in the attic of his Museum to a life of relative obscurity. However, after Stalin's death in 1953, he was sufficiently rehabilitated so that, when he died in 1958 at the age of 79, his body was cremated and his ashes placed in the Kremlin Wall Necropolis.

== Legacy ==
The city Yekaterinoslav was renamed Dnipropetrovsk after Petrovsky from 1926 until 2016. Petrovsky himself was present at the provisional District Congress of Workers', Peasants' and Soldiers' Deputies that recommended this renaming and he did "accept this honor with great gratitude." The resolution of the congress was approved by a resolution of the Presidium of the Supreme Soviet dated 20 July 1926. On 20 May 2016 the city was renamed "Dnipro". Some Ukrainians believed that the city should have been renamed after Ukraine gained independence in 1991. The city was eventually renamed to comply with 2015 decommunization laws. Ukraine's Dnipropetrovsk Oblast was not renamed because as such it is mentioned in the Constitution of Ukraine, and the Oblast can only be renamed by a constitutional amendment.

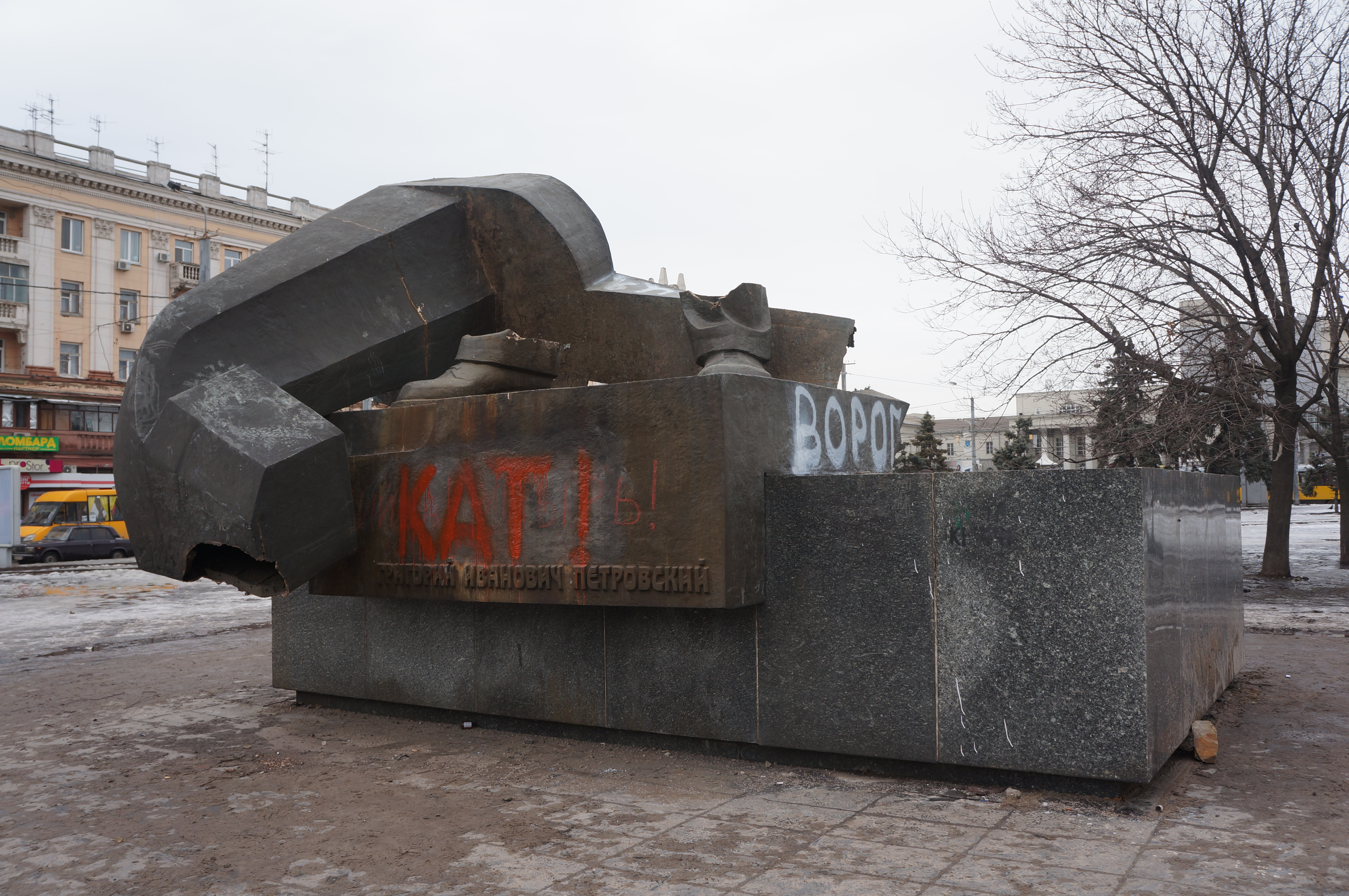
The demolished monument to Petrovsky in Dnipropetrovsk as photographed on 30 January 2016.

A statue of Petrovsky in Kyiv (the capital of Ukraine) was demolished in late November 2009, just days before the annual Ukrainian commemorating of the victims of the Holodomor. President of Ukraine Viktor Yushchenko had issued a decree ordering the removal of monuments to Soviet leaders, "in memory of the victims of the Holodomor". Petrovsky's statue in then still named Dnipropetrovsk was demolished on 29 January 2016. In April 2014 the local statue of Vladimir Lenin had already been demolished.

== See also ==
- Bibliography of the Russian Revolution and Civil War
- Outline of the Russian Revolution and Civil War
- Index of articles related to the Russian Revolution and Civil War
