= Constitution of Ukraine (disambiguation) =

The current Constitution of Ukraine was adopted in 1996.

The Constitution of Ukraine may also refer to:

- the 1978 Constitution of the Ukrainian SSR after the 1991 amendments
- any of the four Constitutions of the Ukrainian Soviet Socialist Republic, adopted in 1919, 1929, 1937 and 1978
- Constitution of the Ukrainian People's Republic, adopted in 1918
- Constitution of Pylyp Orlyk, adopted in 1710
