= Tenth All-Ukrainian Congress of Soviets =

1927 congress

The Tenth All-Ukrainian Congress of Soviets (Ukrainian: Всеукраїнський з'їзд Рад) was a congress of Soviets (councils) of workers, peasants, Red-army-men deputies that took place in Kharkiv on April 6 - 13, 1927.

== Composition ==
There were 1059 delegates. Among the delegates 718 were Communists.

== Agenda ==
- Report of government of the Ukrainian SSR
- About the work of Soviets
- About situation with agriculture and measures in developing it
- About situation with industry and perspectives of its development
- About changes to the Constitution of the Ukrainian SSR on organization of trade and cooperation and others

== Decisions ==
- approved the work of government of the Ukrainian SSR (Chubar Government)
  - special attention to matters in improving the work of industry,
  - proper and timely planning,
  - compliance with the economy mode,
  - improving planned regulation of agriculture,
  - implementation of measures aimed at the development of collectivization.
- Paying much attention in improvement of the government office (state apparatus)
  - making it cheaper,
  - elimination of bureaucracy and red tape,
  - involvement of workers in the work of the state organs,
  - strengthening of Soviets in villages, cities and settlements,
  - improving the work of okruha and raion executive committees (ispolkom).

It elected the All-Ukrainian Central Executive Committee consisting of 302 members and 92 candidates as well as representatives of the Ukrainian SSR to the Council of Nationalities of the Central Executive Committee of the Soviet Union.
