= Fourth All-Ukrainian Congress of Soviets =

USSR-era political conference

Fourth All-Ukrainian Congress of Soviets (Ukrainian: Всеукраїнський з'їзд Рад) was a congress of Soviets (individual councils) of workers, peasants, and Red-army-men deputies, that took place in Kharkiv on May 16–20, 1920. Many of the topics discussed at the congress closely corresponded to the agenda of the Fourth Conference of the Communist Party of Ukraine, that took place two months earlier in March 1920.

The congress took place shortly after the second re-occupation of Ukraine by the USSR.

== Composition ==
There were 811 delegates all with a ruling vote, including 710 communists.

== Agenda ==
- Government report and co-reports about mutual relations between Russian SFSR and Ukrainian SSR, about food supply issue, about education
- War with Szlachcic Poland

== Decisions ==
The congress has adopted the order of Central Executive Committee of Ukraine and Sovnarkom of Ukraine about strengthening Workers-Peasants authority that had great significance to reform government on a war footing due to war.

In resolution about state relations between Ukrainian SSR and Russian SFSR, the congress condemned attempts as counter-revolutionary to break or weaken the union of Ukraine with the Soviet Russia and other Soviet republics.

The congress adopted a resolutions on land and food issues.

In resolution on government report the congress outlined measures for further development of national education, adopted a law about Committees of Poor Peasants.

The congress appealed to peasants, workers, warriors of the Red Army, and all working people of Ukraine with a manifesto in which it urged them to direct their efforts to defeat the enemy.

The congress elected 82 members to the All-Ukrainian Central Executive Committee and 44 candidates as well as 38 members and 13 candidates to the Russian Executive Committee. The honorary member of the All-Ukrainian Central Executive Committee was elected Vladimir Lenin.
