= Noah Barou =

Ukrainian trade unionist and political activist

Noah Barou (23 November 1889 – 5 September 1955) was a Ukrainian trade unionist and political activist.

Born in Poltava, in Ukraine, Barou joined Poale Zion in his youth, this being a banned movement at the time. He attended Kyiv University, but was expelled in 1908 for socialist activism. In 1910, he was exiled to northern Russia, but he was soon allowed to continue his studies in Germany, at the University of Heidelberg and University of Leipzig. He returned to Russia in 1913, when a general amnesty was offered, and there became the general secretary of Poale Zion. During World War I, he was prominent in the Jewish War Relief Organisation, and then in 1918, he became one of three general secretaries of the All-Ukrainian Central Council of Trade Unions.

Following the October Revolution, Barou represented Poale Zion in the International Congress of National Minorities and the All-Russian Congress of Soviets. At the Second Congress of the latter body, he gave a speech outlining why Poale Zion was leaving the body. He found work with the Central Union of Consumer Cooperatives, who sent him to London to head up its office there. After a few years in London, he was briefly posted to Berlin, but then returned to London, where he became the director of the Moscow Narodny Bank.

Barou joined the Fabian Society, serving on its executive in the 1940s, and writing books on co-operative banking and insurance. He was also a Zionist activist, becoming a founder of the World Jewish Congress in 1936, and chairing its European executive from 1948. He also served on the Board of Deputies, founding with Maurice Orbach its Trades Advisory Council, and was a leading figure in negotiating West Germany's restitution payments to Israel.

Barou died in 1955, and the World Jewish Congress' British section instituted an annual lecture in his memory.
