= All-Ukrainian Central Council of Trade Unions =

The All-Ukrainian Central Council of Trade Unions (Utsentrprof) was the first national trade union federation in Ukraine.

The First All-Ukrainian Congress of Workers was held in May 1918, bringing together 300 delegates who represented 311 trade unions which claimed a total of more than 500,000 members. The congress had a Menshevik majority and voted in favour of the nationalisation of industry, an independent people's republic of Ukraine, and major changes to labour laws. The congress also established the country's first national trade union federation. It appointed three general secretaries, one of whom was Noah Barou.

The formation of the federation encouraged the creation of numerous new Ukrainian trade unions, and rapid growth in overall trade union membership. However, the increasingly strong Bolsheviks saw Ukraine becoming part of a Soviet Union, and wanted the trade unions to merge into larger ones, organised on that basis.

By April 1919, the Bolsheviks were in control of the Ukrainian trade union movement. That month, they convened the First All-Ukrainian Trade Union Congress in Kharkov, which dissolved Utsentrprof. In 1924, a second congress was held, which established a successor, the All-Ukrainian Council of Trade Unions.
