= Seventh All-Ukrainian Congress of Soviets =

1922 congress

The Seventh All-Ukrainian Congress of Soviets (Ukrainian: Всеукраїнський з'їзд Рад) was a congress of Soviets (councils) of workers, peasants, and Red Army men that took place in Kharkiv from December 10 to 14, 1922.

== Composition ==
There were 785 delegates with a ruling vote and 44 with advisory vote. Among the delegates 739 were Communists.

== Agenda ==
- Report of the Ukrainian Sovnarkom (by Mikhail Frunze, as a deputy chairman in the government of Christian Rakovsky)
- Report of the People's Commissariat of Finance of the Russian SFSR
- Summary of work on development in Agriculture
- About situation of industry in Ukraine
- Report of the Central Commission in helping starving and about measures in combating the consequences of famine (Grigoriy Petrovsky)
- Soviet development
- About unification of Soviet republics
- About Red Army
- Elections to the All-Ukrainian Central Executive Committee and delegates for the Tenth Russian Congress of Soviets

== Decisions ==
The congress outlined concrete measures

- in development of industry
- reconstruction and development of agriculture
- liquidation of consequences of famine

== See also ==
- First All-Union Congress of Soviets
