= Rafail Farbman =

Russian revolutionary and Soviet politician

- Рафаи́л Фа́рбман

Acting First Secretary of the Communist Party (Bolsheviks) of Ukraine
- In office 10 December 1919 – 23 March 1920
- Preceded by: Stanislav Kosior
- Succeeded by: Nikolay Bestchetvertnoi

Personal details
- Born: 1893 Kursk, Kursk Governorate, Russian Empire
- Died: 1966 (aged 72–73) Moscow, Soviet Union
- Citizenship: Russian Empire (subject); Soviet Union
- Party: RSDLP (Bolsheviks)(1910–1918); All-Union Communist Party (1918–1966)

Rafail Borisovich Farbman (Russian: Рафаи́л Бори́сович Фа́рбман, Ukrainian: Рафаіл Борисович Фарбман; 1893–1966) was a revolutionary Bolshevik and Soviet politician.

== Biography ==
Born in 1893 in Kursk, in to a Jewish family. Farbman was a member of RSDLP since 1910 at the age of 17. He conducted revolutionary activities in Kiev. In 1914 he was arrested and exiled to Tobolsk Governorate. After the February Revolution Farbman joined the Kiev committee of RSDLP becoming a chairman of Kiev Trade Unions and eventually a member of central committee of the Communist Party (bolsheviks) of Ukraine and the Central Executive Committee of Ukraine.

In 1919 as a member of Frontlines Bureau Farbman was in charge of the information and communication party department and a member of Orgbureau of the Communist Party of Ukraine. From January through March 1920 he acted as a secretary of the central committee in the absence of Stanislav Kosior. Later in 1920 Farbman moved to Moscow where he headed a city department of People's Education. He was a delegate at the 9th and 10th congresses of RSDLP(b). On December 18, 1927, Farbman was excluded from the Communist Party as a member of the United Opposition on a decision of the 15th Congress of the CPSU, but in 1932 he was reinstated. In 1930-35 Farbman worked as a deputy chief of the Trust Administration "Rudmetalltorg" (Metal-ore trade). In 1933 he was excluded from the party once again for Trotskyism and in 1935 he was arrested, receiving a life sentence. Farbman was freed only in 1956 and received an amnesty. He died in 1966.

Party political offices
| Preceded by Stanislav Kosior | 1st Secretary of the Communist Party of Ukraine (acting); 1920–1920 | Succeeded by Nikolai Beschetvertnoi |
