= Mykola Marchak =

Soviet politician

- Микола Марчак
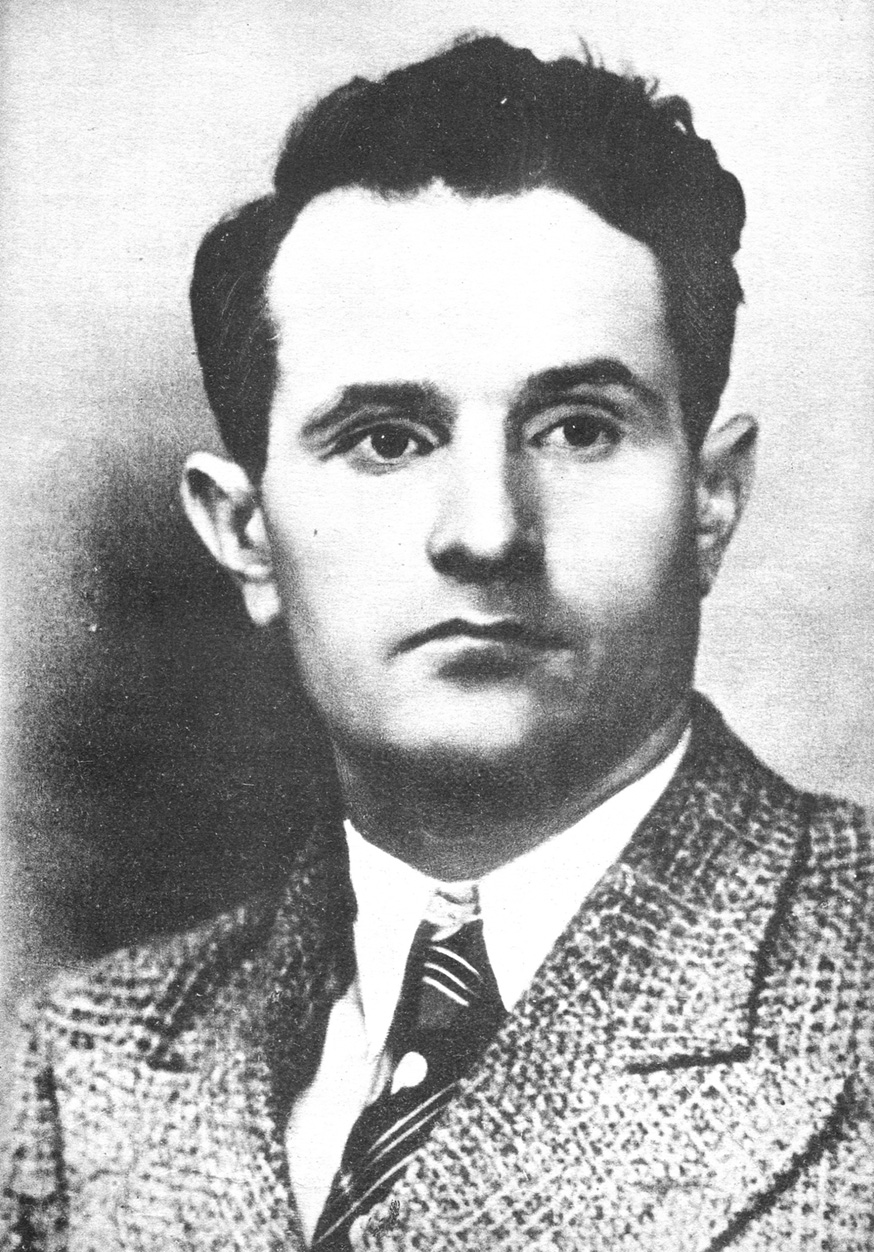
- Marchak in 1937

acting Chairman of the Council of People's Commissars of the Ukrainian SSR
- In office 13 October 1937 – 21 February 1938
- Preceded by: Mykhailo Bondarenko
- Succeeded by: Demyan Korotchenko

Personal details
- Born: 8 January 1904 Zalistsi, Podolia Governorate, Russian Empire
- Died: 23 September 1938 (aged 34)
- Party: Communist Party (Bolsheviks) of Ukraine (1927–1938)

Mykola Makarovych Marchak (Ukrainian: Микола Макарович Марчак; 5 January 1904 – 23 September 1938) was a Ukrainian and Soviet politician, who was the acting Chairman of the Council of People's Commissars of the Ukrainian SSR (today's equivalent of prime-minister) from October 1937 to February 1938 and a people's deputy of the Soviet Supreme Soviet (1937–1938).

== Biography ==
Mykola Marchak was the son of a poor peasant from the village of Zalistsi (near Dunaivtsi). In 1915, he graduated from a church parish school. In 1918, Marchak returned to school until September 1922. In 1922 to 1923, he studied at the preparation courses of the Kamianets-Podilskyi Institute of People's Education (today Kamianets-Podilskyi Ivan Ohiienko National University). From 1923 to 1927, Marchak was a teacher and later the director of a local school where he was from. In 1924, he joined Komsomol and was a member of the local Komsomol of Ukraine (LKSMU) cell.

From 1927, he was a member of the Communist Party (Bolsheviks) of Ukraine.

From 1928 to 1931, Marchak studied at the Institute of People's Economy and the Chemical and Technological Institute in Kyiv.

From 1931 to 1937, as an engineer, Marchak worked at the Kharkiv Tractor Plant.

In 1932, Marchak, without interrupting his employment at the plant, graduated from the Mechanical Faculty of the Kharkiv Engineering and Pedagogical Institute.

In October - November 1937, he served as the first deputy of the People's Commissar of Education of the Ukrainian SSR. To this post, Marchak was approved by the Politburo of the Central Committee of the Communist Party (Bolsheviks) of Ukraine on 8 October 1937 during the ongoing political repressions better known as the Great Purge. Already on 29 October 1937, he was approved as the first deputy chairman of the Soviet of the People's Commissars of Ukraine along with Yakiv Tiahnybida. It happened soon after Mykhailo Bondarenko, the chairman of the Soviet of the People's Commissars of Ukraine, was charged with Trotskyism ("belonging to anti-Soviet Trotskyist terrorist and sabotage organization").

On 20 June 1938, Marchak was arrested in his office and accused of belonging to a rightist underground anti-Soviet Trotskyist organization and counter-revolutionary relations with the former director of the Kharkiv Tractor Plant. On 23 September 1938, Marchak was found guilty by the Military Collegium of the Supreme Court of the USSR and was sentenced to death. Marchak was rehabilitated by the resolution of the Military Collegium of the Supreme Court of the USSR of 17 June 1958.

Political offices
Preceded by Mykhailo Bondarenko	Acting Chairman of the Council of People's Commissars of Ukraine (Ukrainian SSR); 1937–1938	Succeeded by Demyan Korotchenko
