= Nikolay Bestchetvertnoi =

Russian-Ukrainian Bolshevik revolutionary, Soviet politician and journalist

Nikolay Ilych Bestchetvertnoi (Russian: Николай Ильич Бесчетвертной) was a Russian-Ukrainian Bolshevik revolutionary, Soviet politician and journalist.

Born in 1895 in Rostov-on-Don, Bestchetvertnoi was a member of RSDLP(b) since 1915 and as a member of central committee of Communist Party of Ukraine (bolsheviks) (CP(b)U) he worked in 1918 for underground organization of the Kharkiv Governorate party committee. In 1920 Bestchetvertnoi was degraded to the status of candidate to members of the party central committee, yet he was elected as a secretary of the committee and a member of provisional bureau CP(b)U (Politburo). Bestchetvertnoi also was the chief editor of the newspaper "Kommunist of Ukraine" in 1920.

In 1927 he was expelled from Communist Party at the 15th Congress VKP(b) and later retired. On September 4, 1936, Bestchetvertnoi was arrested and was executed by firing squad on May 29, 1937.

Party political offices
Preceded by Rafail Farbman (acting)	1st Secretary of the Communist Party of Ukraine; 1920–1920	Succeeded by Stanislav Kosior (temporary)
