= Mykhailo Bondarenko =

Ukrainian and Soviet politician

- Михайло Бондаренко
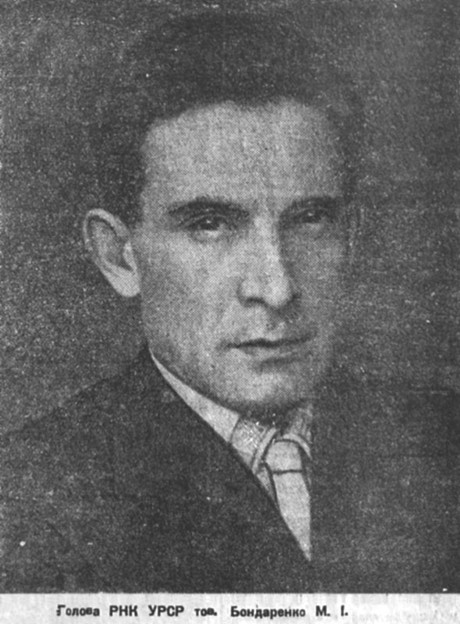
- Bondarenko in 1937

7th Chairman of the Council of People's Commissars of the Ukrainian SSR
- In office 30 August 1937 – 13 October 1937
- Preceded by: Panas Lyubchenko
- Succeeded by: Mykola Marchak

Personal details
- Born: 8 September 1903 Yelizavetgrad, Kherson Governorate, Russian Empire
- Died: 10 February 1938 (aged 34) Moscow, Russian SFSR, Soviet Union
- Party: All-Union Communist Party (bolsheviks)

Mykhailo Illich Bondarenko (Ukrainian: Михайло Ілліч Бондаренко; 8 September 1903 – 10 February 1938) was a Ukrainian and Soviet politician and Soviet propagandist, who served as the Chairman of the Council of People's Commissars of Ukrainian SSR (today's equivalent of prime-minister) from August to October 1937.

== Biography ==
Mykhailo Bondarenko was born in a peasant family in a town of Yelizavetgrad (present day Kropyvnytskyi), central Ukraine.

In 1925–1931 he made a career in his hometown of Zinovyevsk (Kropyvnytskyi). In 1925 Bondarenko became a member of the Russian Communist Party (Bolsheviks). In 1925–1926 he was a head of the department of agitation and propaganda of the committee of the Communist Party (Bolsheviks) of Ukraine (CP(b)U) of the Krasnaya Zvezda plant in Zinovyevsk (Kropyvnytskyi). In 1926–1927 he became a head of the department of the Executive Committee of the Zinovyevsk Okruha Council (Zinovyevsk Okruha). In 1927–1928 he served as a secretary of the Kompaniivka Raion Committee of the CP(b)U in Kompaniivka Raion that existed in Zinovyevsk Okruha. In 1929 Bondarenko served as a head of the department of culture of the Zinovyevsk Okruha Council of Trade Unions. In 1930–1931 he was a head of the cultural and propaganda department of the Zinovyevsk City Committee of the CP(b)U and in 1930 – a chief editor of the Zinovyevsk Okruha newspaper.

In 1931–1936 Mykhailo Bondarenko was dispatched to Azerbaijan as a party cadre where he held positions at several local governments. In 1931–1933 he worked as a deputy head and a head of the department of agitation and mass campaigns of the Transcaucasian Krai Committee of the All-Union Communist Party (Bolsheviks) (VKP(b)). In 1931–1933 he served as a head of the organizational department of the Baku City Committee of the Communist Party (Bolsheviks) of Azerbaijan. In 1934–1937 he was a member candidate of the Central Committee of the Communist Party (Bolsheviks) of Azerbaijan. In 1934–1935 Bondarenko served as a 1st Secretary of the Azizbekov City Committee and in 1935–1936 – a 1st Secretary of the Shaumyan District Committee of the Communist Party (Bolsheviks) of Azerbaijan. For his work in Azerbaijan, he was awarded with the Order of the Red Banner of Labour (1936).

In December 1936 Bondarenko returned to Ukraine.

On 13 October 1937, Bondarenko was arrested during an official trip in Moscow and charged with the belonging to anti-Soviet Trotskyist terrorist and sabotage organization, which acted in the oil industry of the USSR. On 8 February 1938 the Military Collegium of the Supreme Court sentenced him to be shot, and on 10 February he was executed. Bondarenko was rehabilitated by the Military Collegium of the Supreme Court of the USSR on 14 April 1956.

== Family ==
Son: Vitaly Bondarenko (1925–2018), a Soviet and Russian scholar in the field of structural engineering.

Political offices
| Preceded by Panas Lyubchenko | Chairman Council of People's Commissars of Ukraine (Ukrainian SSR); 1937 | Succeeded by Mykola Marchak |
