= Sixth All-Ukrainian Congress of Soviets =

1921 congress

Sixth All-Ukrainian Congress of Soviets (Ukrainian: Всеукраїнський з'їзд Рад) was a congress of Soviets (councils) of workers, peasants, Red-army-men deputies that took place in Kharkiv on December 14 - 17, 1921.

== Composition ==
There were 1,037 delegates out which 820 had a ruling vote.

== Agenda ==
- Report of the Ukrainian Sovnarkom
- About food tax (Prodnalog)
- Famine and sowing campaign
- Red Army and its tasks
- Committees of Poor Peasants
- Financial policy
- Elections to the All-Ukrainian Central Executive Committee and delegates for the Ninth Russian Congress of Soviets

== Decisions ==
The congress adopted a resolution "About the grain fund for committees of poor peasants". Specific measures to provide assistance for the peasants on the part of the state were outlined in a resolution "About holding a spring sowing campaign in 1922".

In resolution on military issue, were marked numerous events in further strengthening a combat capability of Red Army and Red Fleet.

The congress elected 198 members and 62 candidates to the All-Ukrainian Central Executive Committee as well as 254 delegates for the Ninth Russian Congress of Soviets and 51 candidate to the All-Russian Central Executive Committee from the Ukrainian SSR. The honorary member of the All-Ukrainian Central Executive Committee at the congress was elected Vladimir Lenin. The congress decisions had great significance in creating conditions for successful realization of the Lenin's New Economic Policy.
