= Stanisław Kosior =

Soviet politician (1889–1939)

- Станислав Косиор
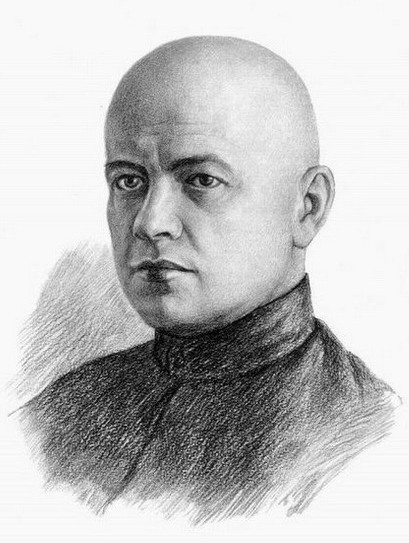
- Kosior in 1920

First Secretary of the Communist Party (Bolsheviks) of Ukraine
- In office 14 July 1928 – 27 January 1938
- Preceded by: Lazar Kaganovich
- Succeeded by: Nikita Khrushchev
- In office 25 March 1920 – 17 October 1920
- Preceded by: Nikolay Bestchetvertnoi
- Succeeded by: Vyacheslav Molotov
- In office 30 May 1919 – 10 December 1919
- Preceded by: Georgiy Pyatakov
- Succeeded by: Rafail Farbman

Full member of the 16th and 17th Politburo
- In office 13 July 1930 – 3 May 1938

Candidate member of the 15th Politburo
- In office 19 December 1927 – 13 July 1930

Full member of the 14th and 15th Secretariat
- In office 1 January 1926 – 12 July 1928

Personal details
- Born: Stanislav Vikentyevich Kosior; 18 November 1889 Węgrów, Siedlce Governorate, Russian Empire (now Poland)
- Died: 26 February 1939 (aged 49) Moscow, Soviet Union
- Citizenship: Russian Empire (subject); Soviet Union
- Party: RSDLP (Bolsheviks) (1907–1918); Russian Communist Party (1918–1938)
- Spouse: Elizaveta Sergeyevna
- Children: 2
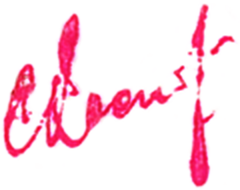
- Signature

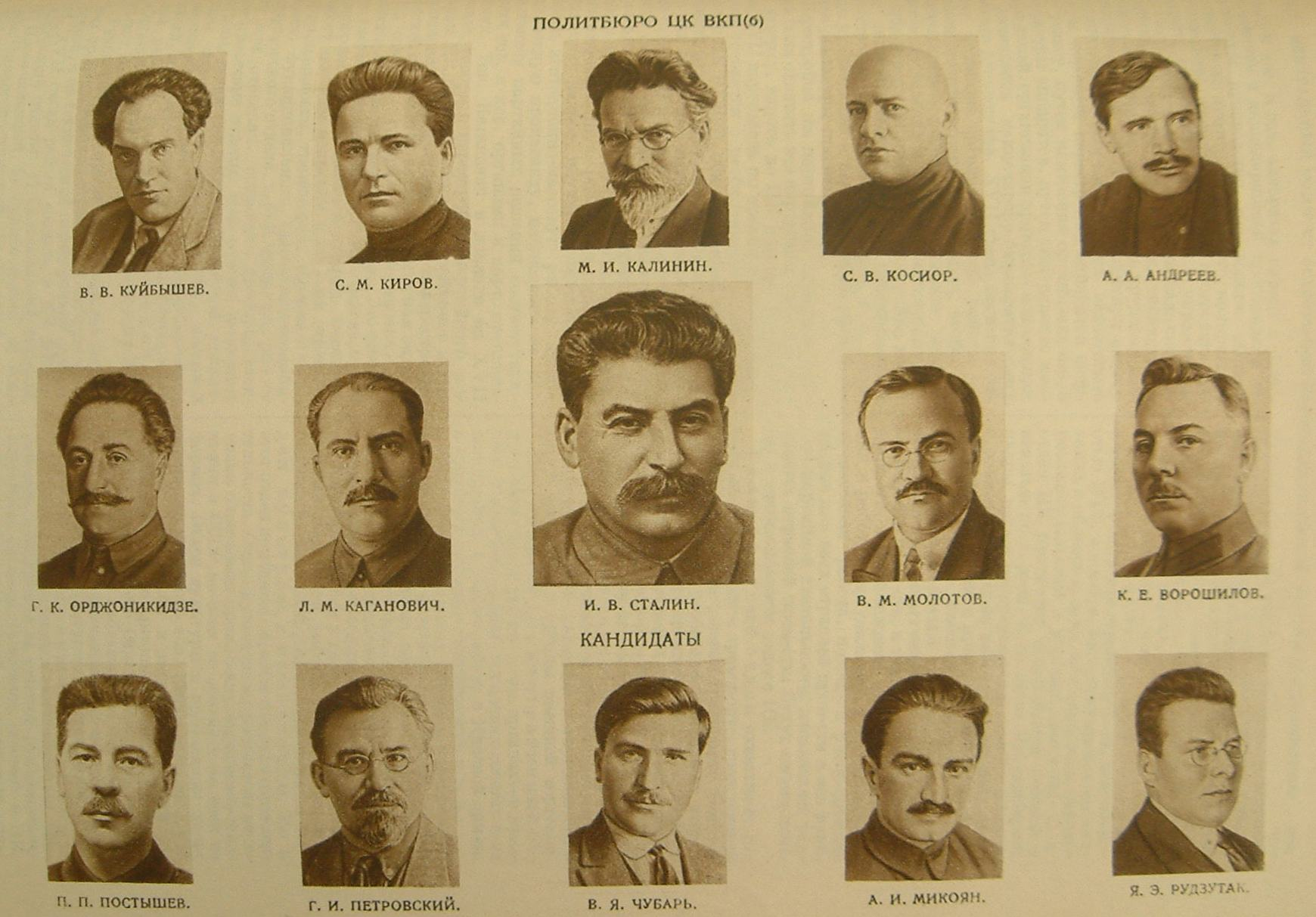
The Politburo elected on 10 February 1934

Stanislav Vikentyevich Kosior (Russian: Станислав Викентьевич Косиор; 18 November 1889 – 26 February 1939), sometimes spelled Kossior, was a Soviet politician who was First Secretary of the Communist Party of Ukraine, Deputy Premier of the Soviet Union and a member of the Politburo of the Communist Party of the Soviet Union (CPSU). He and his wife were both executed during the Great Purge.

== Early career ==
Stanisław Kosior was born in 1889 in Węgrów in the Siedlce Governorate of the Russian Empire, in the region of Podlachia, to a Polish family of humble factory workers. Because of poverty, he migrated east to Yuzovka (modern Donetsk), where he worked at a steel mill. In 1907 he joined the Russian Social Democratic Labour Party and quickly became the head of the party's local branch. He was arrested and sacked from his job later that year, and the following year felt obliged to leave the area due to police activity. He used connections to get re-appointed at the Sulin factory in 1909 but was soon arrested again and deported to the Pavlovsk mine. In 1913, he was transferred to Moscow and then to Kyiv and Kharkiv, where he organized local communist cells. In 1915, he was arrested by the Okhrana, the Russian secret police, and exiled to Siberia.

After the February Revolution, Kosior moved to Petrograd, where he headed the local branch of the Bolsheviks and the Narva municipal committee. After the October Revolution, Kosior moved to the German-controlled areas of the Ober-Ost and Ukraine, where he worked for the Bolshevik cause. After the Treaty of Brest-Litovsk, he moved back to Russia, where in 1920, he became Secretary of the Communist Party of the Soviet Union. He was head of the Siberian branch of the CPSU from March 1922 to December 1925. In January 1926, he was appointed a Secretary of the Central Committee of the CPSU, working alongside the General Secretary, Joseph Stalin.

== Holodomor ==
In July 1928, Kosior was appointed General Secretary of the Ukrainian SSR Communist Party. His return coincided with Stalin's decision to drive the peasants onto collective farms, a policy Kosior supported. Speaking to the Central Committee of the Communist Party of the Soviet Union, in November 1929, he argued that collectivisation was the only way to make progress in agriculture. In February 1930, he declared that Ukraine would be "completely collectivised in the course of the spring sowing campaign."

In July 1930, he was elevated to the Politburo of the Communist Party of the Soviet Union. After the harvest in 1931, Kosior knew that collectivisation was causing a catastrophic fall in agricultural output in Ukraine – visiting Moscow in August, he warned Stalin's deputy, Lazar Kaganovich, that there would be a shortfall of 170 million poods (nearly three million tons) of grain, but Kaganovich blamed the problem on mass theft by Ukrainian peasants and forced Kosior to follow this opinion.

Addressing a plenum of the Central Committee of the Communist Party of the Soviet Union (of which he had been a member since 1926) he blamed the failure on middle-ranking officials and party members who listened to the complaints of peasants that the quotas were too high. "Not only did they not fight; not only did they fail to organise the collective farm masses in the struggle for bread against the class enemy, they often followed along with this peasant mood", he also said.

On Stalin's orders, Kosior pushed through a decree "On grain procurements" on 15 January 1932, which increased the power of the central government in Kharkiv to direct the confiscation of grain in the regions. The fact that he imposed this measure, "despite starvation in Ukrainian villages", was the first of several examples cited by the Kyiv Court of Appeal in its 2010 resolution that judged Kosior to have been complicit in genocide. The court also recorded that on 1 February, he and Vlas Chubar co-signed a decree "On Seed", directing local committees to deny any seed aid to Ukraine's collective farms; on 17 March he signed a decree "On seed reserves", which led to increased repression of peasants who were resisting the confiscation of grain; and on 29 March, he pushed through a decree "On Polissia", under which 5,000 peasant families were deported from the Polissia region of Ukraine.

In April 1932, after touring the countryside, Kosior wrote to Stalin to say that there had been trouble from hungry peasants refusing to sow grain, and delicately requested that food be sent to Ukraine, which prompted an angry rejection and seemingly made Stalin suspect that Kosior was not ruthless enough. "The worst aspect of this situation is Kosior's silence," he told Kaganovich, when other leading Ukrainian communists pleaded for help. When Kosior submitted a formal request for relief to the Politburo in Moscow in June, it was turned down flat, and Kaganovich warned him his "mistakes" would be held as an example to other regional party leaders of how not to do their job. This was because Kosior's attempt to find an accommodation between Moscow's demands and the crisis in the countryside had turned Stalin against him. He told Kaganovich that Kosior was "manoeuvring" and engaging in "rotten diplomacy" and being "criminally frivolous." He considered sacking Kosior and sending Kaganovich in his place. However, Kosior and his deputy, Pavel Postyshev, met Stalin, who agreed to reduce Ukraine's grain quota. That seemed to settle their differences.

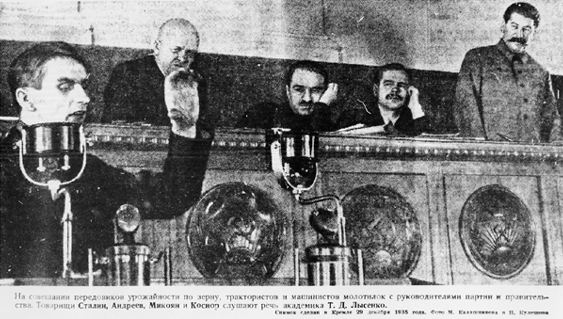
Stanislav Kosior at the Kremlin in 1935. From left to right are Trofim Lysenko, Kosior, Anastas Mikoyan, Andrei Andreyev, and Joseph Stalin

In November, Kosior delivered a speech blaming the trouble in the countryside on Ukrainian nationalists. In 1935, he was awarded the Order of Lenin "for remarkable success in the field of agriculture".

== The Great Purge ==
Kosior loyally supported Joseph Stalin at the start of the Great Purge. He was one of eight Soviet leaders whom the defendants at the first of the Moscow trials, in August 1936, were forced to confess that they plotted to assassinate. Five of the lists of people to be executed early in the purge were cosigned by him. At a plenum of the Central Committee of the CPSU in December 1936, he delivered a personal attack on Nikolai Bukharin, who had been the leading opponent of collectivisation, calling him a liar. At the next plenum, he called for Bukharin and Alexei Rykov to be arrested but voted against executing them.

In January 1938, he was recalled to Moscow and replaced by Nikita Khrushchev, who was told by Stalin that Kosior "wasn't doing a good job". Khrushchev wrote in his memoirs that he objected to the transfer, partly because he liked Kosior, whom he described as "a fairly mild-mannered person, pleasant and intelligent", but Stalin overruled him. Kosior was appointed head of the Soviet Control Office and deputy prime minister of the USSR.

Kosior was arrested and stripped of all Party posts on 3 May 1938. During Khrushchev's "Secret Speech" to the 20th Party Congress in 1956, he disclosed that Kosior's case was handled by Boris Rodos, a particularly notorious torturer employed by the NKVD, who was ordered to force a confession out of him. Under interrogation, Kosior withstood brutal tortures, including being interrogated for 14 hours at a time. After he had been broken, he was called to Stalin's office to confront Grigory Petrovsky, the Chairman of the All-Ukrainian Central Executive Committee (de jure head of state) and the co-Chairman of the Central Executive Committee of the Soviet Union, who refused to believe that Kosior was guilty. As Petrovsky described the meeting later:

They sat Kosior in a chair. He sat there depressed; it was obvious he had been through a lot. "Well talk!" "What can I say?" Kosior replied. "You know I'm a Polish spy." ... Then Stalin remarked triumphantly: "There, you see, Petrovsky, and you didn't believe Kosior became a spy. Now do you believe he's an enemy of the people?"

Kosior was sentenced to death on 26 February 1939 by shooting and shot the same day by General Vasili Blokhin. After Stalin's death, Kosior was rehabilitated by the Soviet government on 14 March 1956.

== Family ==
Kosior was one of four brothers. The oldest, Vladislav Kosior, and one of his younger brothers, Iosif Kosior, were also active communists. Vladislav was executed during the purges, and Joseph died of an illness in 1937. Kosior's wife, Elizaveta Sergeyevna, was arrested on May 3, 1938, accused of being the wife of a counter-revolutionary, and shot on August 3, 1938.

Kosior's son, Vladimir Stanislavovich, born in 1922, died in the Battle of Leningrad in the early days of December 1942.
