= Congress of Soviets =

Governing body in the Soviet Union and Republican China

The Congress of Soviets was the supreme governing body of the Russian Soviet Federative Socialist Republic and several other Soviet republics and national autonomies in the Russian SFSR and the Soviet Union from 1917 to 1936 and a somewhat similar Congress of People's Deputies from 1989 to 1991. After the creation of the Soviet Union, the Congress of Soviets of the Soviet Union functioned as its legislative branch until its dissolution in 1936. Its initial full name was the "Congress of Soviets of Workers', Soldiers' and Peasants' Deputies". It was also sometimes known as the "Congress of People's Deputies." A similar name also applied in communist-held China in the Republican era.

== Russia and the Soviet Union ==
The Congress of Soviets was an assembly of representatives of local councils. In theory, it was the supreme power of the Soviet State, an organ of the dictatorship of the proletariat. No bourgeois, no noble, no aristocrat, no priest could vote – only working people. Officially, the Congress of Soviets created laws and elected the Council of People's Commissars, which was the government. In the interim its functions were performed by designated executive bodies, titled Central Executive Committees, such as the All-Russian Central Executive Committee in Russia. In practice the Congresses became increasingly deferential to the Bolsheviks after the Russian Revolution.

By the time of Lenin's death in 1924 the Congress of Soviets effectively only rubber-stamped the decisions of the Communist Party and served as a propaganda tribune. The 1936 Constitution eliminated the Congress of Soviets, making the Supreme Soviet of the Soviet Union its highest legislative institution. During this time the Central Committee of the AUCP(b) held de facto control over the government.

- Eighth All-Russia Congress of Soviets December 29, 1920

== Ukraine ==
The Bolsheviks convened an All-Ukrainian Congress of Soviets of Workers', Soldiers' and Peasants' Deputies in Kyiv, on December 17, 1917, and in Kharkiv on December 25, 1917.

== China ==
The Chinese Communist Party had convened the National Congress of Chinese Soviets of Workers', Soldiers' and Peasants' Deputies in Ruijin, a city in Jiangxi Province on November 7, 1931. The National Congress of Chinese Soviets is the forerunner to the National People's Congress of the People's Republic of China.

== See also ==
- 1918 Soviet Constitution
- 1924 Soviet Constitution
- 1977 Soviet Constitution
- Congress of People's Deputies of the Soviet Union

== Bibliography ==
- Schapiro, L. (1977). The Origin of the Communist Autocracy: Political Opposition in the Soviet State; First Phase 1917-1922 (2nd Edition). Cambridge, MA: Harvard University Press.
