= All-Ukrainian Council of Trade Unions =

The All-Ukrainian Council of Trade Unions (Ukrainian: Всеукраїнська рада професійних спілок, VURPS) was a national trade union federation in Ukrainian Soviet Socialist Republic.

The first trade union federation in Ukraine was the All-Ukrainian Central Council of Trade Unions, which was suppressed in 1919. In 1920, the Bolsheviks established the Bureau for the South of Russia, as part of the Soviet All-Union Central Council of Trade Unions. In 1924, this was refounded as VURPS. It grew to have more than 2,000,000 members by 1929, but remained subordinate to the Soviet federation. In 1937, it was dissolved, and was not replaced until after World War II, when the Ukrainian Republican Council of Trade Unions was established.
