= Yukhym Medvediev =

Chairman of the All-Ukrainian Central Executive Committee

- Юхим Медведєв
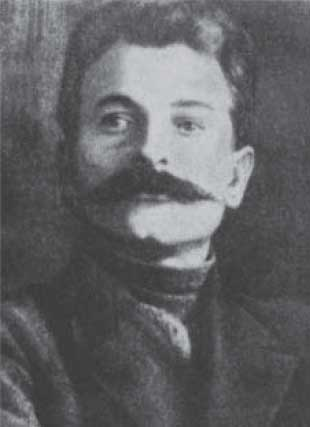
- Medvedev in 1918

Chairman of TsVK
- In office 24 December 1917 – 18 March 1918
- Preceded by: Office established
- Succeeded by: Volodymyr Zatonsky

Personal details
- Born: April 1, 1886 Bakhmut, Yekaterinoslav Governorate, Russian Empire
- Died: June 7, 1938 (aged 52) Soviet Union
- Party: RSDLP (1904–1917); USDLP (1917–1919); Borotbists (1919–1920); CP(b)U (1920–1932)
- Education: Bakhmut Technology College

Yukhym Hryhorovych Medvediev (Ukrainian: Юхим Григорович Медведєв, Russian: Ефим Григорьевич Медведев, romanized: Yefim Grigoryevich Medvedev; 1 April 1886 – 7 June 1938) was a Ukrainian Soviet politician and the first elected chairman of the Soviet parliament in Ukraine. Medvediev was a member of various Communist parties, but in early 1930s quit his political life and committed himself to a civilian life. In January 1938, he was arrested by the State Security police and later that year shot on the grounds of being an anti-Soviet terrorist. In 1957, Medvedev was rehabilitated posthumously.

== Biography ==
Medvediev was born in Bakhmut city of Yekaterinoslav Governorate (Now in Donetsk Oblast, Eastern Ukraine) in a family of Ukrainian ethnicity. After finishing the Bakhmut Technological College he worked as an electrical technician at factories of Bakhmut and Yekaterinoslav.

In 1904 Medvediev enrolled into the Russian Social Democratic Labour Party (RSDLP), but in 1917 he became a member of the Ukrainian Social Democratic Labour Party. The same year he initiated the organization of the Kharkiv Ukrainian left social-democrats which cooperated with the Bolsheviks. In December 1917 Medvediev became one of the organizers of the 1st All-Ukrainian Congress of Soviets of Peasants', Workers', and Soldiers' Deputies in Kharkiv. The congress formed the All-Ukrainian Central Executive Committee, the chairman of which Medvediev was elected on December 24, 1917. The committee supported the Bolsheviks' intentions on the liquidation of the government of the Ukrainian People's Republic. In January–February 1918 he headed the Soviet Ukrainian delegation to the Brest's negotiations. Medvediev was dismissed as the chairman of TsVK in March 1918 and with withdrawal of the Soviet forces from Ukraine moved to Moscow. There he was a member of the Bureau of Ukrainian left social-democrats in exile. After the Russian aggression on Ukraine in August 1919 Medvediev joined Borotbists, however already in July 1920 the party has self-liquidated at its 4th Party Congress and most of its members joined the ranks of the Communist Party (Bolsheviks) of Ukraine.

At the start of 1930s, Medevediev has fully quit the political life and lived in the capital city of Kharkiv where he worked at numerous locations. On 27 January 1938 he was arrested for alleged membership of a military-terrorist organization and anti-Soviet activity. He was sentenced to death on 11 May and shot on 7 June 1938. He was posthumously rehabilitated on 22 November 1957.

== Bibliography ==
Fedorovsky, Yu. Our countryman – the first Soviet president. "Bratia-slavyane" #16. May 2010.
