= All-Ukrainian Central Executive Committee =

Representative body of the All-Ukrainian Congress of Soviets

All-Ukrainian Central Executive Committee Всеукраїнський центральний виконавчий комітет

Type
- Type: Unicameral

History
- Succeeded by: Presidium of the Supreme Soviet

Leadership
- 1st Chairman: Yukhym Medvedev, USDRP (left) since December 24, 1917
- 2nd Chairman: Volodymyr Zatonsky, Bolshevik since March 19, 1918
- 3rd Chairman: Hryhoriy Petrovsky, CP(b)U since March 10, 1919

Structure
- Seats: variable
- Political groups: Communists
- Political groups: non-Communists

Meeting place
- Kharkiv, Ukrainian SSR (until 1934); Kyiv, Ukrainian SSR (from 1934)

All-Ukrainian Central Executive Committee (Ukrainian: Всеукраїнський центральний виконавчий комітет, romanized: Vseukrainskyi tsentralnyi vykonavchyi komitet) was a representative body of the All-Ukrainian Congress of Soviets. It was the supreme legislative, administrative, executive controlling state power of Soviet Ukraine (Ukrainian SSR) between the sessions of the Congress of Soviets that acted between 1917 until 1938. In the very beginning this institution was established as the Central Executive Committee of Soviet of Ukraine at the First All-Ukrainian Congress of Soviets in Kharkiv on January 6-7, 1918. At the same congress was elected the People's Secretariat of Ukraine.

On March 19, 1919, the committee issued a declaration, in which it passed most of its authority to the Sovnarkom of Ukraine at that time headed by Christian Rakovsky.

== Historical scope ==
The committee was first elected at the 1st All-Ukrainian Congress of Soviets on January 6, 1917, under the name of TsVK of Soviet Ukraine. The first committee was accounted for 41 members among which 35 were Bolsheviks and four were Left SRs. One of the members Yukhym Medvedev was the Ukrainian Social-Democratic Labour Party (left deviation). The committee did not last long and on April 18, 1918, was merged with the People's Secretariat into the Uprising Nine, a type of revkom.

TsVK was reanimated once again by the 3rd All-Ukrainian Congress of Soviets in Kharkiv on March 10, 1919. On the same session of the congress was adopted the Constitution of Ukrainian SSR which established legal basis for the Soviet power in the state. The committee was named as VUTsVK (for All-Ukrainian Central Executive Committee), but often was referred to as TsIKUK. The new committee was almost twice as big while the number of its members continued to grow from one convocation of the congress to another. The committee was reorganized after the adoption of the Constitution of Ukrainian SSR of 1937.

In total there were 14 convocations of the committee, 12 of which were taken place in Kharkiv. For almost 20 years from 1919 to 1938 head of the committee was Petrovsky. He however was overshadowed by more prominent Party leaders such as Vyacheslav Molotov, Lazar Kaganovich, Dmitriy Manuilsky, and others. The other chairmen of the committee served for less than a year.

== Chairmen ==
=== Central Executive Committee of Soviet Ukraine ===
- Yukhym Medvedev January 6, 1917 – March 18, 1918
- Volodymyr Zatonsky March 19, 1918 – April 18, 1918 (2nd All-Ukrainian Congress in Katerynoslav)

=== All-Ukrainian Central Executive Committee (of Soviets) ===
Since 1935 the committee changed back to the Central Executive Committee of Ukrainian SSR.

- Hryhoriy Petrovsky March 10, 1919 – July 25, 1938

== Subordinated offices ==
- Central Commission in affairs of National Minorities
- Extraordinary Commission (Cheka), created on 22 February 1918
- Regional Military-Revolutionary Committee to Combat Counter-Revolution, provisional office for creation of Red Guards elements, established on 31 December 1917

== List of elected members ==
=== 1918 ===
- Pyotr Anokhin (Bolshevik)
- Nikolay Artamonov (Bolshevik)
- Vladimir Aussem (Bolshevik)
- Sergei Bakinskiy (Bolshevik)
- Yevgenia Bosch (Bolshevik)
- Boris Belenskiy (Bolshevik)
- Alexander Horwitz (Bolshevik)
- Hochman (Menshevik-Internationalist)
- Nikolay Danilevskiy (Bolshevik)
- Pyotr Zagrebelny (Bolshevik)
- Andrei Ivanov (Bolshevik)
- Izrail Kulik (Bolshevik)
- Yuriy Lapchinskiy (Bolshevik)
- Vladimir Luxemburg (Bolshevik)
- Martyanov (Bolshevik)
- Yefim Medvedev (Left Ukrainian Social-Democrat)
- Andrei Novikov (Socialist-Revolutionary)
- Arshak Aleksandrov (Left Socialist-Revolutionary)
- Ostragorskiy (Bolshevik)
- Leonid Pyatakov (Bolshevik)
- Alexey Piontkovskiy (Bolshevik)
- Nikolay Poldyayev (Bolshevik)
- Polikarp Reshetko (Bolshevik)
- Ivan Sambur (Bolshevik)
- Yevsey Segal (Bolshevik)
- Sergei Sivkov (Bolshevik)
- Silin (Bolshevik)
- Slutskiy (Bolshevik)
- Smolyakov (Bolshevik)
- Fyodor Sergeyev (Comrade Artyom, Bolshevik)
- Alexander Yemelyanov (Comrade Surik, Bolshevik)
- Nikolay Tarnagrodskiy (Bolshevik)
- Yevgeniy Terletskiy (Left Socialist-Revolutionary)
- Tiniakov (Bolshevik)
- Samuil Firger (Bolshevik)
- Alfred Zeiger (Bolshevik)
- Nikolay Chupilka (Bolshevik)
- Vasiliy Shakhray (Bolshevik)
- Stepan Sheludko (Socialist-Revolutionary)
- Shustov (Bolshevik)
- Isac Erliherman (Left Socialist-Revolutionary)

== Treaty of Brest-Litovsk delegation ==
The signing of the Treaty of Brest-Litovsk was attended by representatives of the Soviet Ukraine. The delegation consisted of Vasyl Shakhrai and Yukhym Medvedev, members of the AUkrCEC.

== See also ==
- Verkhovna Rada
- All-Ukrainian Congress of Soviets
- Council of People's Commissars (Ukraine)
