= 1938 Ukrainian Supreme Soviet election =

- 26 June 1938

All 304 seats in the Supreme Soviet 153 seats needed for a majority
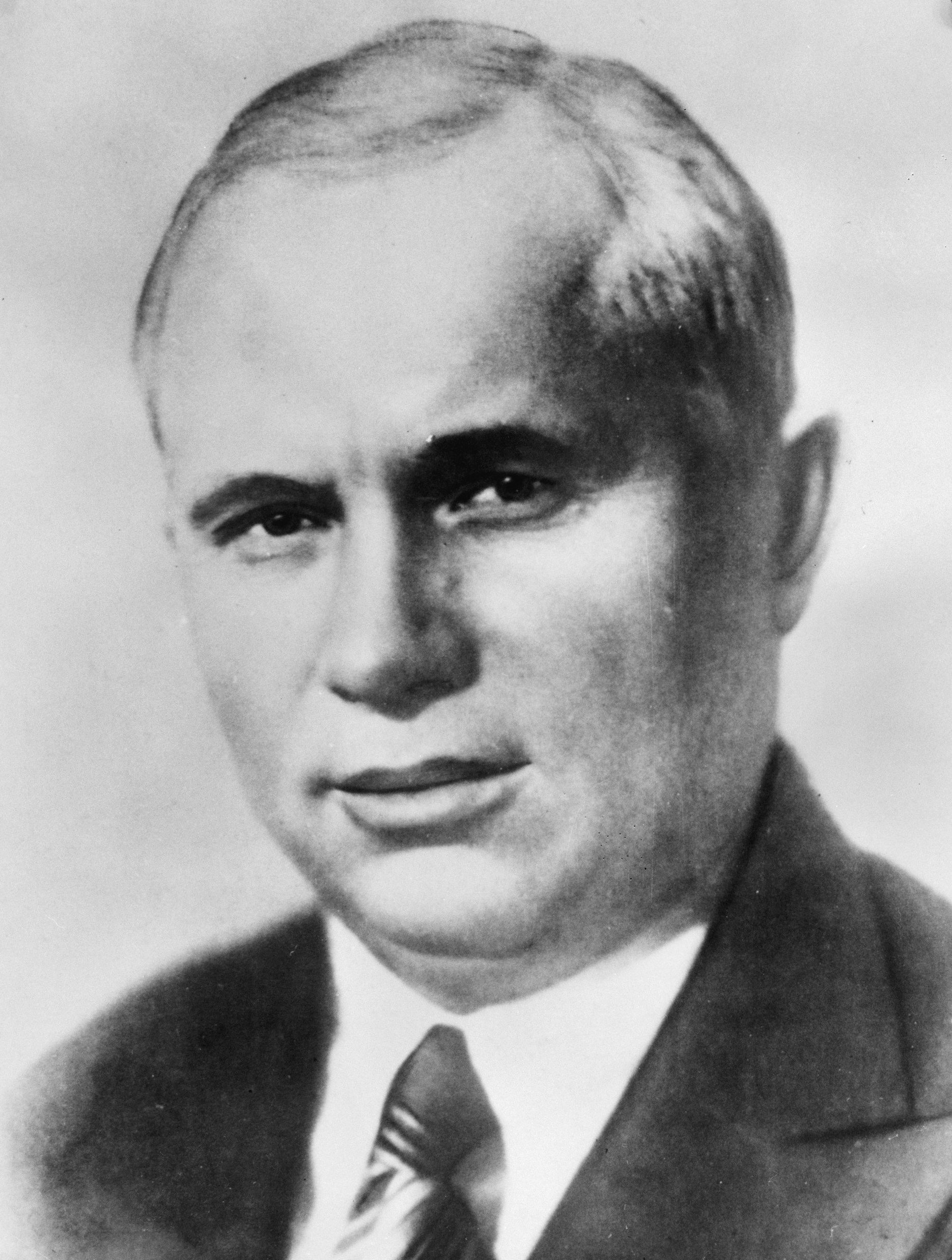

	First party	Second party
Leader	Nikita Khrushchev	Yakov Khomenko
Party	Communist Party of Ukraine	Komsomol
Elected Chairman of Parliament
Mikhail Burmistenko
Communist Party

The 1938 Ukrainian Supreme Soviet elections were held in the Ukrainian SSR on 26 June 1938 to elect deputies to the Supreme Soviet. They were held alongside elections to the Supreme Soviet of the Russian SFSR as well as regular oblast councils and followed the national elections to the Supreme Soviet of the Soviet Union on 12 December 1937.

These elections were the first phase of deputies' elections to the Supreme Soviet of the Ukrainian SSR, which were later coopted with others soon after the start of the World War II and annexation of territories neighboring the Soviet Union in Poland and Romania. In 1940, 80 more deputies were elected representing territories of today's Western Ukraine, while in 1941 a third wave of elections added 16 more deputies to the Supreme Soviet of the Ukrainian SSR representing Bukovina and Budjak. At the same time, the Supreme Soviet of the Ukrainian SSR lost deputies from the Moldavian ASSR which joined the Supreme Soviet of the newly created union republic of Moldova (Moldavian SSR).

== Background ==
A new Constitution of the Ukrainian SSR ("Stalin's Constitution") had been adopted in 1937. Previously on 5 December 1936 at the 8th Extraordinary Congress of Soviets of the Soviet Union, there was already adopted the Constitution of the whole Union which became a base for development and adaptation of constitutions of union republics. On resolution of Presidium of the All–Ukrainian Central Executive Committee (AUCEC) of 13 June 1936, there was established the AUCEC Constitutional Commission. By prior decision of Politburo of Central Committee of the Communist Party (Bolsheviks) of Ukraine (CC CP(b)U), the Presidium approved personnel composition of the Constitutional Commission. The developed draft of Constitution of the UkrSSR by the commission was submitted under existing practice to CC CP(b)U, Central Committee of the All-Union Communist Party (Bolsheviks) (CC VCP(b)), after which the agreed draft was reviewed by the AUCEC Presidium. After the AUCEC Presidium approved the draft it decided to submit the draft for review to the 16th Extraordinary All-Ukrainian Congress of Soviets.

Coincidentally in 1937 to Ukraine were dispatched three personal representatives of Stalin Vyacheslav Molotov, Nikolai Yezhov, and Nikita Khrushchev. After their arrival in Ukraine were arrested and executed 17 members of government. The chairman of Sovnarkom of the UkrSSR Panas Lyubchenko committed suicide. The CC CP(b)U that was recently elected on 3 June 1937 at the XIII Party's congress was routed, 10 out of 11 members of Politburo along with 4 out of 5 candidate members perished, while all 9 members Orgburo were repressed. In 1937 – 1938 the next two chairmen of Sovnarkom of the UkrSSR Mykhailo Bondarenko and Mykola Marchak were arrested and executed as a Trotskyists.

The first session of the newly elected Supreme Soviet took place on 25–28 July 1938. According to the parliamentary tradition, it was opened by the oldest deputy, professor of Kharkiv University Dmitrii Sintsov. According to Article 26 of the Constitution of the Ukrainian SSR, the session elected the Chairman of the Verkhovna Rada Mykhailo Burmystenko and his two deputies. The Presidium of the Verkhovna Rada headed by Leonid Korniyets was also elected.

== Results ==
=== Political affiliation ===
- Communist Party of Ukraine – 73%
- Komsomol of Ukraine – 10.9%
- Unaffiliated – 16.1%

=== Social background ===
- Workers – 50.3%
- Peasants – 25%
- Intelligentsiya – 24.7%

=== National background ===
- Ukrainians – 61.5%
- Russians – 34.5%
- Other nationalities – 4%

Note: the nearest 1939 Soviet Union census across the Ukrainian SSR accounted for the following percentages: Ukrainians – 23667509/30946218 (76.5%), Russians – 4175299/30946218 (13.5%), others – 3103410/30946218 (10%).

=== Gender background ===
- Women – 26.6%
- Men – 73.4%

Note: the nearest 1939 Soviet Union census across the Ukrainian SSR accounted for the following percentages: women – 16192652/30946218 (52%), men – 14753566/30946218 (48%).

== List of deputies ==
=== Elected in 1938 ===
==== Kamianets-Podilskyi Oblast ====
Winners in single-member constituencies
No. of mandates	Electoral District		Candidate	Occupation	Reelected status
No. of mandates	Name	No.	Candidate	Occupation	Reelected status
18	Zaslav	001	Ivan Solhub	village teacher/Mykhniv	No/WWII MIA
18	Antoniny	002	Ivan Zhabrev	Chief NKVD in region	No/Executed by Soviet regime
18	Krasyliv	003	Mikhail Grulenko	2nd secretary of Communists	No/WWII MIA/remains recovered in 2005
18	Volochysk	004	Stepanyda Kaminska	kolkhoz Komunar/Pysarivka	No/kolkhoz in Pysarivka
18	Chemerivtsi	005	Aleksandr Volkov	Chief of the 23rd NKVD border detachment	No/retired in Moscow
18	Stara Ushytsia	006	Mariya Solomko	Head of kolkhoz imeni Kalinina	No/hospital nurse/Kamianets-Podilsky
18	Horodok	007	Dmitry Ryabyshev	Chief of the 4th Cavalry Corps	No/retired in Rostov-na-Donu
18	Smotrych	008	Iryna Stoyanska	kolkhoz imeni Kaganovicha	No/deputy head of district ispolkom
18	Kamianets-Podilsky	009	Rayisa Murynets	kolkhoz imeni Kirova/Ruda	No/ostarbeiter in 1944
18	Slavuta	010	Yakov Sharaburko	Commander of the 5th Cavalry Div.	No/retired in Moscow
18	Proskuriv	011	Aleksandr Uspensky	Narkom of Internal Affairs/Ukraine	No/Executed by Soviet regime
18	Shepetivka	012	Aleksandr Vlasov	1st secretary of Communists	No/WWII MIA/accounted as perished
18	Polonne	013	Nikolay Kozyrev	Head of regional ispolkom	No/Narkom of Soviet farms/Ukraine
18	Starokostiantyniv	014	Ivan Zuyev	Political commissar at the 25th Tank Corps	No/WWII MIA/remains recovered in 1965
18	Derazhnia	015	Hanna Horilchenko	teacher in Derazhnia	No/teacher in Derazhnia
18	Nova Ushytsia	016	Kliment Voroshilov	Narkom of Defense/Soviet Union	Yes/Deputy chairman of the Council of Ministers/Soviet Union
18	Dunayivtsi	017	Mariya Derykoz	weaver of cloth factory imeni Lenina/Dunayivtsi	No/stayed in evacuation/Barnaul
18	Letychiv	018	Yavdokha Horbatyuk	Head of Kopytyntsi rural council	No/deputy chair of district ispolkom
Notes: District. Electoral districts are not part of the administrative territorial system and may include several territorial units of the Ukrainian regions (raions, cities of regional significance, and others).

==== Zhytomyr Oblast ====
Winners in single-member constituencies
No. of mandates	Electoral District		Candidate	Occupation	Reelected status
No. of mandates	Name	No.	Candidate	Occupation	Reelected status
18	Novohrad-Volynsky	019	Andrey Yeryomenko	Commander of the 6th Cavalry Corps	No/member of the Supreme Soviet/Soviet Union
18	Baranivka	020	Ananiy Drahan	Shepherd, farm supervisor of kolkhoz imeni Voroshilov	No/same occupation
18	Chudniv	021	Vladimir Perov	Head of the Organizational Committee	No/Supervisor of the department of information and statistics/Presidium
18	Januszpil	022	Makar Zhuk	Brigadier at the Pryvitiv MTS	No/unknown
18	Olevsk	023	Pavel Kotov	Deputy commander of the Kiev Military District Air Force	No/retired in Leningrad
18	Yemilchyne	024	Olena Baranovska	team leader of the Kolkhoz imeni Thälmann	No/Supervisor for "Zohotlyon"/Yemilchyne branch
18	Volodarsk-Volynsky	025	Hanna Zhukovets	head of the Nebizh rural council	No/member of the Kiev Oblast court
18	Cherniakhiv	026	Yelyzaveta Khylchuk	student of the Zhytomyr Teacher Institute	No/auditor of the Party's Higher School/CC Communists
18	Zhytomyr I	027	Maksim Didenko	1st secretary of Orgbureau of the CP(b)U/region	No/arrested by NKVD/MIA
18	Zhytomyr II	028	Demyan Korotchenko	Chairman of the Sovnarkom/UkrSSR	Yes/Chairman of the Sovmin/UkrSSR
18	Andrushivka	029	Isak Shapiro	Deputy Narkom of the Internal Affairs/UkrSSR	No/Supervisor of the "Sovkhozstroymaterialy"/UkrSSR
18	Berdychiv	030	Vladimir Didur	1st secretary of the Berdychiv gorkom/CP(b)U	No/Party board of the Rivne Oblast/CP(b)U
18	Ovruch	031	Filip Matykin	Commander of the 87th Rifle Div.	No/WWII MIA/remains recovered later
18	Korosten	032	Mikhail Polyakov	Chief of the Kiev Military District political department	No/uncertain/retired
18	Korostyshiv	033	Vasiliy Osokin	Chief of the UkrSSR NKVD border and internal security department	No/head of the Local Anti-Air Defense/Soviet Union
18	Ruzhyn	034	Fyodor Remezov	Troop commander of the Zhytomyr Army Group	No/Frunze War Academy faculty chief/Moscow
18	Bazar	035	Olena Melnychuk	teacher in Radomyshl	No/retired
18	Radomyshl	036	Grigoriy Vyatkin	Chief of NKVD in region	No/Executed by Soviet regime
Notes: District. Electoral districts are not part of the administrative territorial system and may include several territorial units of the Ukrainian regions (raions, cities of regional significance, and others).

==== Vinnytsia Oblast ====
Winners in single-member constituencies
No. of mandates	Electoral District		Candidate	Occupation	Reelected status
No. of mandates	Name	No.	Candidate	Occupation	Reelected status
23	Bar	037	Ivan Zhadan	Director of sugar factory/Yaltushkiv	No/uncertain/died
23	Kopayhorod	038	Nadiya Hrebenyuk	precinct livestock technician/Kopayhorod Raion land department	No/Supervisor of Healthcare Department of the Kopayhorod Raion ispolkom
23	Mohyliv-Podilskyi	039	Semyon Timoshenko	Troop commander of the Kiev Military District	No/Supreme Soviet/Soviet Union
23	Khmilnyk	040	Pyotr Didenko	Political commissar of the 14th Rifle Regiment (72nd Rifle Div.)	No/Deputy chief of the 11th camp department of the 62nd USSR NKVD Department of POW camps
23	Vinnytsia rural	041	Paraskoviya Samoylenko	worker at the State Garment Factory/Vinnytsia	No/Supervisor of Technical Control Department of the State Garment Factory/Vinnytsia
23	Zhmerynka	042	Pyotr Dibrova	Political commissar of the 1st Kiev Artillery School	No/Frunze War Academy faculty chief
23	Sharhorod	043	Mikhail Petrov	Kiev Military District artillery chief	No/WWII KIA
23	Yampil	044	Tayisiya Tkach	team leader of the kolkhoz imeni Petrovskoho	No/head of the Komintern kolkhoz/Bila
23	Kalynivka	045	Hanna Oleksyshyna	brigadier of the Vesele sovkhoz livestock department/Kordelivka	No/head of the Kozyatyn ispolkom
23	Vinnytsia urban	046	Mikhail Burmistenko	acting, 2nd secretary of the CC CP(b)U	No/WWII KIA
23	Tomashpil	047	Ivan Milyutin	acting, head of the Vinnytsia Oblast ispolkom	No/chief of the Dnipropetrovsk Oblast department of bread products
23	Kozyatyn	048	Gavriil Mischenko	1st secretary of the Vinnytsia Oblast/CP(b)U	No/Verkhovna Rada commissioner on kolkhozes at the USSR Sovmin
23	Lypovets	049	Ahafiya Adamchuk	tractor operator at the Starokostiantyniv MTS	No/chief of the Illintsi District Savings Bank
23	Nemyriv	050	Vira Kovryha	team leader at the kolkhoz imeni Shevchenka/Voronovytsia	No/head of the Velyki Krushlyntsi rural council
23	Bratslav	051	Fyodor Gorenkov	2nd secretary at the Vinnytsia Oblast/CP(b)U	No/chief of the Republican department of labour reserves
23	Tulchyn	052	Oleksandr Korniychuk	secretary at the Writers' Union/UkrSSR	Yes/chairman of the Verkhovna Rada
23	Kryzhopil	053	Semyon Kravchenko	Chairman of the Party Board at the CC CP(b)U	Yes/Presidium chairman of the Kiev Oblast Bar Association
23	Pohrebyshche	054	Halyna Stoyanovska	rural teacher in Dzyunkiv	No/out of work/disabled of the second category
23	Haisyn	055	Fyodor Yevtukhov	commander of the Kiev Military District Motor Transport Battalion	No/POW/freed, Rostov Oblast
23	Chechelnyk	056	Andrei Sakharov	People's judge/Chechelnyk	No/member of the Supreme Court/UkrSSR
23	Monastyryshche	057	Ivan Korablyov	Chief of NKVD in region	No/arrested/Kuybyshev Oblast ispolkom forwarding department
23	Teplyk	058	Yevheniya Smilyanets	team leader of the Karabelivka kolkhoz	No/team leader of the Karabelivka kolkhoz
23	Bershad	059	Ilarion Syniavskyi	head of the kolkhoz imeni Druhoyi piaterichky	No/Forestry director/Bershad Raion
Notes: District. Electoral districts are not part of the administrative territorial system and may include several territorial units of the Ukrainian regions (raions, cities of regional significance, and others).

==== Moldavian ASSR ====
Winners in single-member constituencies
No. of mandates	Electoral District		Candidate	Occupation	Reelected status
No. of mandates	Name	No.	Candidate	Occupation	Reelected status
6	Kodyma	060	Maria Barbulat	team leader of the kolkhoz imeni 1-she Travnya	No/uncertain/moved to Moldavian SSR in 1940
6	Rybnytsia	061	Vladimir Borisov	1st secretary of the Moldavia Oblast/CP(b)U	No/arrested/rehabilitated
6	Hryhoriopil	062	Viktor Khaskin	chief of the Tiraspol border detachment	No/deputy chief of the Corrective labor camps and colonies department of the Moscow Oblast NKVD department
6	Tyraspil	063	Dmytro Chornyi	electrician-installer at the canning factory imeni Pershoho Travnia/Tiraspol	No/unknown
6	Balta	064	Heorhiy Kashcheyev	commissioner of the USSR People's Commissariat of Procurement in Ukraine	No/died due to illness in 1939
6	Kotovsk	065	Tihon Konstantinov	acting, head of the MASSR Central Executive Committee	No/head of the Moldavian SSR Sovnarkom
Notes: District. Electoral districts are not part of the administrative territorial system and may include several territorial units of the Ukrainian regions (raions, cities of regional significance, and others).

==== Kyiv and Kyiv Oblast ====
Winners in single-member constituencies
No. of mandates	Electoral District		Candidate	Occupation	Reelected status
No. of mandates	Name	No.	Candidate	Occupation	Reelected status
29	Chornobyl	066	Mariya Parkhomenko	team leader of the kolkhoz imeni Petrovskoho/Kahanovychi Raion	No/head of the Tarasy rural council
29	Dymer	067	Marfa Rak	rural teacher/Katyuzhanka	Yes/1st secretary of the Dymer Raion/CP(b)U
29	Borodianka	068	Hnat Yura	stage and artistic director/Franko Drama Theatre	Yes/stage and artistic director/Franko Drama Theatre
29	Fastiv	069	Ivan Patorzhynskyi	soloist/Ukrainian theatre of opera and ballet	Yes/professor/Kiev Conservatory
29	Skvyra	070	Tymofiy Slipenchuk	school director/Volodarka	No/WWII KIA
29	Tetiiv	071	Petro Davydenko	head of the kolkhoz imeni Stalina Zhashkiv Raion	No/executed by Nazi aggressors
29	Kyiv Leninsky	072	Vyacheslav Molotov	Chairman of the Sovnarkom/Soviet Union	No/Minister of Foreign Affairs/Soviet Union
29	Kyiv Kirovsky	073	Andriy Dushko	mechanic-improvisator at the Arsenal Factory/Kiev	Yes/Head of workshop/Arsenal
29	Kyiv Petrovsky	074	Semen Stepanov	Commander of the Kiev Military Port	No/uncertain/deputy chief of Dnieper-Bug military recovery department/Main Military River Department
29	Kyiv Darnytsky	075	Timofei Shamrilo	acting 3rd secretary of the Kiev city/CP(b)U	No/uncertain/WWII KIA
29	Kyiv Molotovsky	076	Nikolai Yezhov	Narkom of Internal Affairs/Soviet Union	No/executed by Soviet regime
29	Kyiv Zhovtnevy	077	Nikita Khrushchev	acting 1st secretary/CP(b)U	Yes/Head of Sovmin/UkrSSR
29	Kyiv Kaganovytsky	078	Lazar Kaganovich	Narkom of Railways/Soviet Union, Deputy chairman of Sovnarkom/Soviet Union	No/1st secretary/CP(b)U
29	Kyiv Stalinsky	079	Joseph Stalin	General secretary/CC VCP(b)	No/Secretary/CC VCP(b), Chairman of Sovmin/Soviet Union
29	Kyiv Zaliznychy	080	Yevdokiya Lehur	Narkom of Social Security/UkrSSR	No/Minister of Social Security/UkrSSR
29	Kyiv rural	081	Oleksandr Bohomolets	President of Academy of Sciences/UkrSSR	No/died in office
29	Vasylkiv	082	Ivan Yevsevyev	commander of the 51st Aviation Brigade of Fighters/Kiev Military District	No/student at the Voroshilov Higher War Academy
29	Bila Tserkva	083	Nikolay Kirilov	commander of the 13th Rifle Corps/Kiev Military District	No/WWII POW/detained by Soviet authorities
29	Tarashcha	084	Mykola Kurach	Narkom of finances/UkrSSR	No/chief of the Kiev Oblast finance department
29	Bucha	085	Ivan Obelets	head of Lysianka Raion ispolkom	No/WWII MIA/uncertain
29	Uman	086	Fyodor Pushkaryov	deputy commander of the 48th Swift Bombing Aviation Regiment/Kiev Military District	No/deputy commander of the 5th Guard Bombing Aviation Division/15th Air Army
29	Khrystynivka	087	Kateryna Osychanska	team leader of the kolkhoz imeni Stalina/Khrystynivka Raion	No/uncertain/student at the Talne vocational agricultural school
29	Obukhiv	088	Stepan Balyka	Narkom of Food Industry/UkrSSR	No/uncertain/Chief of the Glavtsvetmetsbyt Ukrainian chamber/People's Commissariat of Non-Ferrous Metallurgy of the Soviet Union
29	Bohuslav	089	Viktor Zhykharyov	Deputy chief engineer at the Kiev Factory #43	No/uncertain/Instructor of Aviation Industry department/CC CP(b)U
29	Talne	090	Marko Shevchenko	Head of kolkhoz imeni Stalina/Babanka Raion	Yes/Head of kolkhoz imeni Stalina/Babanka Raion
29	Brovary	091	Vasyl Starchenko	Chief of production section at the Kiev Oblast land department	Yes/Deputy chairman of Sovmin/UkrSSR
29	Boryspil	092	Hanna Bidnenko	team leader of kolkhoz imeni Lenina/Boryspil Raion	Yes/team leader of kolkhoz imeni Vasylyev/Dymer Raion
29	Rzhyshchiv	093	Moisei Spivak	1st secretary of Kaharlyk Raion/CP(b)U	No/1st secretary of Zhytomyr Oblast/CP(b)U/Deputy minister of Ministry of Furniture and Carpentry/UkrSSR
29	Kaniv	094	Pavlo Tychyna	Academician of the Academy of Sciences/UkrSSR	Yes/Minister of Education/UkrSSR
29	Korsun	095	Maryna Hnatenko	student of the Kiev Institute of Food Industry imeni Mikoyana	No/research fellow of the All-Union scientific and research institute of sugar beets/instructor of agriculture at the Kiev Oblast committee/CP(b)U
29	Zvenyhorodka	096	Zynoviy Serdyuk	2nd secretary of the Kiev City Committee/CP(b)U	Yes/1st secretary of the Kiev Oblast Committee/CP(b)U
29	Shpola	097	Lukeriya Kryzhnya	Rabfak student at the Uman Agricultural Institute	No/uncertain/agronomist of the Kiev Oblast land department
29	Zlatopil	098	Serafyma Hrabovska	head of Maslove rural council/Zlatopil Raion	No/uncertain/deputy chair woman of Zlatopil Raion council
29	Pereiaslav	099	Sofiya Maletska	milkmaid at Khmilyovyk plemkhoz (sovkhoz)/Baryshivka Raion	No/uncertain/milkmaid at Khmelyovyk beet sovkhoz/Berezan Raion
29	Cherkasy	100	Stepan Kalinin	deputy troop commander/Kiev Military District	No/convicted for anti-Soviet propaganda
29	Smila	101	Marfa Chernenko	team leader of kolkhoz imeni Chervonoyi Armiyi/Smila Raion	No/uncertain/recorded as executed by Nazis
29	Kamianka	102	Aleksei Dolgushev	chief of NKVD/Kiev Oblast	No/imprisoned in the NKVD Ivdellag
29	Chyhyryn	103	Hryhoriy Atamas	brigadier of kolkhoz imeni Lenina/Cherkasy Raion	No/head of kolkhoz imeni Lenina/Cherkasy Raion
Notes: District. Electoral districts are not part of the administrative territorial system and may include several territorial units of the Ukrainian regions (raions, cities of regional significance, and others).

==== Odesa Oblast ====
Winners in single-member constituencies
No. of mandates	Electoral District		Candidate	Occupation	Reelected status
No. of mandates	Name	No.	Candidate	Occupation	Reelected status
19	Haivoron	104	Volodymyr Krymskyi	brigadier of Hrushka MTS imeni Kaganovycha/Hrushka Raion	No/1st secretary of Hrushka (Ulyanivka) Raion
19	Liubashivka	105	Nataliya Fedorenko	rural teacher in Zakharivka/Velyka Vradiivka Raion	No/uncertain/director of school in Velyka Vradiivka
19	Andriyevo-Ivanivka	106	Zinayida Tkach	head of kolkhoz imeni Chapayeva in Stari Mayaky/Shyriaieve Raion	No/uncertain/During WWII was evacuated to Omsk Oblast
19	Tsebrykove	107	Nikolai Nikolskiy	chief of the 26th NKVD border detachment in Odesa	No/moved to Moldavian SSR/in the MVD department of Convoy Troops
19	Rozdilna	108	Ivan Halenkov	deputy head of Military Tribunal/Kiev Military District	No/retired in Odesa
19	Holovanivsk	109	Pavlo Kyselyov	chief of NKVD/Odesa Oblast	No/executed by Soviet regime
19	Pervomaisk	110	Aleksei Mezherin	acting 2nd secretary of Odesa Oblast/CP(b)U	No/deputy minister of Forestry/UkrSSR
19	Odesa-Illichivsky	111	Oleksiy Usikov	head of DerzhPlan/UkrSSR	No/uncertain/construction materials industry
19	Odesa-Leninsky	112	Nikolai Vorobyov	presser in forging and pressing shop of the October Revolution Factory/Odesa	No/WWII MIA
19	Odesa-Voroshylovsky	113	Vladimir Filatov	director of the Ukrainian science and research institute of Eye Diseases and Tissue Therapy	Yes/director of the Ukrainian science and research institute of Eye Diseases and Tissue Therapy
19	Odesa-Stalinsky	114	Grigoriy Teleshev	1st secretary of Odesa Oblast committee/CP(b(b)U	No/chief department of special logistics/Ministry of Food Industry/USSR/deputy minister of Food Industry/Latvian SSR
19	Odesa-Kaganovitsky	115	Mykhailo Bezsonov	machinist-instructor at steam locomotive depot/Odesa-Tovarna Railway Station	No/uncertain/machinist at diesel locomotive depot/Odesa-Tovarna Railway Station
19	Odesa-Vodnotransportny	116	Dmitriy Lisin	senior mechanic at Voroshilov steam boat/Black Sea Shipping Company	No/uncertain/Black Sea Shipping Company
19	Odesa rural	117	Dmitriy Grechukhin	chief of the NKVD Special department/Kiev Military District/acting deputy Narkom of Internal Affairs/UkrSSR	No/executed by Soviet regime
19	Khmelyove	118	Sofiya Provolotska	team leader of sovkhoz imeni Mikoyana in Mala Vyska	No/deputy head of the Khmelyove Raion ispolkom
19	Harbuzynka	119	Nikifor Kalchenko	acting head of Odesa Oblast ispolkom	Yes/Minister of Industrial Crops/UkrSSR/Minister of Sovkhozes/UkrSSR
19	Voznesensk	120	Klavdiya Slipchenko	chief of livestock farm at kolkhoz imeni NKVD/Voznesensk Raion	No/chief of production at the "Bolshevik" sewing industrial artel/Voznesensk
19	Berezivka	121	Mikita Astapenka	harvester driver at MTS imeni Shevchenka/Berezivka Raion	No/uncertain/director of MTS in Berezivka
19	Novoukrainka	122	Sergei Metelkov	lieutenant/Black Sea Fleet	No/WWII MIA
Notes: District. Electoral districts are not part of the administrative territorial system and may include several territorial units of the Ukrainian regions (raions, cities of regional significance, and others).

==== Mykolaiv Oblast ====
Winners in single-member constituencies
No. of mandates	Electoral District		Candidate	Occupation	Reelected status
No. of mandates	Name	No.	Candidate	Occupation	Reelected status
16	Kirove-Pershy	123	Vira Hryshchenko	tool technician of the "Chervona Zirka" Factory in Kirove	Yes/instructor of human resources department/Kirovohrad Oblast Committee/CP(b)U
16	Kirove-Druhy	124	Fyodor Astakhov	Soviet Air Force commander/Kiev Military District	No/uncertain/in military and civil aviation
16	Bobrynets	125	Dmytro Zhyla	Narkom of Food Industry/UkrSSR	No/director of canning factory complex in Kherson
16	Bashtanka	126	Vasiliy Shilo	Narkom of Grain and Livestock Sovkhozes/UkrSSR	No/uncertain/in Ministry of State Control/UkrSSR
16	Mykolaiv-Pershy	127	Georgiy Mikhailov	mechanical-engineer at the Shipyard imeni Marti in Mykolaiv	Yes/head of the Mykolaiv city ispolkom/party of organizer of the CC VCP(b) at the Shipyard imeni Nosenka in Mykolaiv
16	Mykolaiv-Druhy	128	Mefodiy Petrenko	chief of the rear support inspection/Kiev Military District	No/uncertain/deputy Permanent representative of UkrSSR at the Sovmin/USSR
16	Mykolaiv-Tretiy	129	Ivan Studenko	master of machine shop and editor of a factory newspaper "Udarnik"/Shipyard imeni 61 Communards in Mykolaiv	No/uncertain/retired
16	Znamianka	130	Terentiy Yakovlyev	head of kolkhoz imeni Yezhova in Dmytrivka/Znamianka Raion	No/uncertain/deputy head of Znamianka Raion ispolkom
16	Oleksandriia	131	Pyotr Karamyshev	chief of NKVD/Mykolaiv Oblast	No/executed by Soviet regime
16	Novyi Buh	132	Pavel Starygin	1st secretary of Mykolaiv Oblast Committee/CP(b)U	Yes/Narkom of Meat and Dairy Industry/UkrSSR/1st deputy minister of Meat and Dairy Industry/UkrSSR
16	Velyka Oleksandrivka	133	Lev Khyrenko	brigadier and harvester driver of Bereznehuvate MTS	No/chief of production department/Kherson Oblast land section
16	Kherson-Pershy	134	Andriy Trubenchuk	turbine master of steam turbine power station in Kherson	No/uncertain/deputy chairman of the Kherson city ispolkom
16	Kherson-Druhy	135	Ivan Filipov	head of Orgburo of the Verkhovna Rada Presidium/Mykolaiv Oblast	No/1st secretary of Mykolaiv Oblast Committee/CP(b)U/chairman of the Dnipropetrovsk Oblast ispolkom
16	Hola Prystan	136	Olena Matviyeva	team leader of kolkhoz imeni Stakhanova/Hola Prystan Raion	No/uncertain/Ukrainian military horse factory/Shchorsk Raion
16	Kakhovka	137	Kuzma Bilokhvist	head of Knyaze-Hryhorivka rural council	No/WWII MIA
16	Chaplynka	138	Horpyna Krysina	head of Khorly Raion ispolkom	No/died in 1944
Notes: District. Electoral districts are not part of the administrative territorial system and may include several territorial units of the Ukrainian regions (raions, cities of regional significance, and others).

==== Chernihiv Oblast ====
Winners in single-member constituencies
No. of mandates	Electoral District		Candidate	Occupation	Reelected status
No. of mandates	Name	No.	Candidate	Occupation	Reelected status
26	Horodnia	139	Sava Kholodnyak	teacher of the Horodnia middle school	No/director of the Horodnia pedagogic school
26	Chernihiv urban	140	Ivan Yermilov	engineer, head of cardboard workshop of the Chernihiv cotonine factory	No/same position and location
26	Chernihiv rural	141	Mykhailo Kuznetsov	secretary of the Chernihiv city committee of the CP(b)U	Yes/same position and location
26	Oster	142	Ivan Kompanets	3rd secretary of the Chernihiv Oblast committee of the CP(b)U	No/1st secretary in Ternopil, Zakarpattia and Chernivtsi regions
26	Shchors	143	Serhiy Kostyuchenko	surpervisor of the Chernihiv Oblast committee of the CP(b)U agrarian department	No/1st secretary of the Zhytomyr Oblast committee of the CP(b)U
26	Kulykivka	144	Maria Kovbych	brigadier of female tractor brigade of the Berezna MTS	No/executed by Nazis in Berezna
26	Bobrovytsia	145	Yevdokia Shuda	agronomist of the Mryn MTS/Nosivka Raion	No/the same position and location
26	Nizhyn	146	Polina Radchenko	doctor at the Nizhyn city hospital	No/in the Ministry of Healthcare of Ukraine
26	Mala Divytsia	147	Oleksiy Fedorov	1st secretary of the Chernihiv Oblast committee of the CP(b)U	Yes/1st secretary in Kherson and Izmail regions/Minister of Social Security of Ukraine
26	Semenivka	148	Hryhoriy Hubenko	director of the Koryukivka MTS	No/chairman of the Koryukivka Raion ispolkom
26	Borzna	149	Ivan Borisov	chief of the Chernihiv Oblast land lot department	No/deputy Narkom of the Land Lot Affairs of the Soviet Union
26	Bakhmach	150	Vira Tyshchenko	brigadier of female tractor brigade of the Bakhmach MTS	No/executed by Nazis
26	Ichnia	151	Demyd Druz	head of kolkhoz imeni Kirova/Komarivka Raion	No/executed by Nazis
26	Sribne	152	Kateryna Tudel	team leader of kolkhoz imeni Stalina/Sribne Raion	No/farm supervisor at the same kolkhoz
26	Pryluky	153	Vasyl Bobyr	1st secretary of the Pryluky Raion committee of the CP(b)U	No/3rd secretary of the Odesa Oblast committee of the CP(b)U
26	Novhorod-Siverskyi	154	Sofron Panchenko	deputy head of the Chernihiv Oblast ispolkom	No/fate unknown
26	Krolevets	155	Vasyl Cherednychenko	head of the Korop Raion ispolkom	No/same position and place
26	Konotop	156	Andrei Yegorov	chief of the Chernihiv Oblast NKVD directorate	No/executed by NKVD
26	Dmytrivka	157	Ksenia Haidamaka	head of the Mali Bubny rural council	No/same position in Romny
26	Shostka	158	Valentyna Khondoshko	worker at Shostka film factory	No/head of workshop at Shostka film factory
26	Yampil	159	Petro Ushkalov	Narkom of Forestry	No/chief of the Head Directorate of Industrial Enterprises/Ministry of housing and civil construction
26	Hlukhiv	160	Pyotr Filatov	Commander of the 15th Rifle Corps	No/perished
26	Putyvl	161	Lyubov Volyntseva	people's judge/Putyvl Raion	No/head of the Chervone Raion ispolkom
26	Buryn	162	Ivan Murza	Narkom of Land Cultivation	No/director of "Ukrsadvyntrest"
26	Smile	163	Illia Drofa	chairman of the Union of consumer associations (Ukoopspilka)	No/Minister of Trade
26	Romny	164	Pyotr Kichigin	tank battalion commander	No/sent to GULAG right before WWII
Notes: District. Electoral districts are not part of the administrative territorial system and may include several territorial units of the Ukrainian regions (raions, cities of regional significance, and others).

==== Poltava Oblast ====
Winners in single-member constituencies
No. of mandates	Electoral District		Candidate	Occupation	Reelected status
No. of mandates	Name	No.	Candidate	Occupation	Reelected status
24	Yahotyn	165	Vasyl Shapoval	deputy politruk	No/tactics instructor at the Vystrel course
24	Zolotonosha	166	Oleksandra Slyva	milkmaid, dairy farm supervisor at the Bolshevik kolkhoz/Zolonosha Raion	No/executed by Nazis
24	Pyriatyn	167	Fedora Yevchenko	team leader of the Prapor komunizmu kolkhoz/Pyriatyn Raion	Yes/supervisor of healthcare department/Pyriatyn Raion ispolkom
24	Orzhytsya	168	Leonid Safronov	1st secretary of the Poltava Oblast committee of the CP(b)U	No/rector of the Dnipropetrovsk State University
24	Chornobai	169	Oleksandr Zadorozhnyi	deputy Narkom of Communal Living of Ukraine	No/fate unknown
24	Lokhvytsia	170	Yelyzaveta Shovkoplyas	deputy chief engineer of the Lokhvytsia alcoholic beverage factory imeni Mikoyana	Yes/3rd secretary of the Poltava Oblast committee of the CP(b)U
24	Lubny	171	Daria Myronenko	field brigade brigadier/kolkhoz imeni Petrovskoho	No/head of the Mykhnivtsi rural council/Lubny Raion
24	Semenivka	172	Vasiliy Markov	3rd secretary of the Poltava Oblast committee of the CP(b)U	No/1st secretary of the Poltava Oblast committee of the CP(b)U/chief of the Directory of rural and kolkhoz construction
24	Hlobyne	173	Omelian Prokopenko	master of the repair and mechanical workshop/Poltavamash	No/died in 1945
24	Kremenchuk Persha	174	Yukhym Hromov	acting mayor of Kremenchuk	No/master of the repair and mechanical workshop/Kryukiv Railcar Factory
24	Kremenchuk Druha	175	Pavlo Zavediy	train driver of the Kremenchuk train station depot	No/inspector of the NKCR special reserve/Kremenchuk train station
24	Novogeorgievsk	176	Vasyl Harbuzov	chief of the school of junior commanders in Poltava/colonel	No/deputy chief of staff of the 8th Guards Bombing Aviation Division
24	Lypova Dolyna	177	Olena Kyva	head of kolkhoz imeni Lunacharskoho/Lypova Dolyna Raion	No/head of Kymlychka rural council/Lypova Dolyna Raion
24	Hadiach	178	Yefosynia Neveryvko	team leader of Radianske zhyttia kolkhoz/Krasna Luka village	No/died in 1943/Stalingrad Oblast
24	Myrhorod	179	Aleksandr Volkov	chief of NKVD in region	No/arrested by NKVD/executed in 1941
24	Khorol	180	Andriy Chekanyuk	chief editor of the Komunist newspaper	No/director (deputy chief) of the Central Committee of CP(b)U directorate of propaganda and agitation/secretary of the Communist Party of Transcarpathian Ukraine
24	Kozelshchyna	181	Vladimir Muratov	deputy head of the Verkhovna Rada Presidium OrgCommittee/Poltava Oblast	No/chairman of the People's Commissars Council of the Republic of Yakutia/Minister of Social Security of Ukraine
24	Zinkiv	182	Marko Shevchenko	head of the kolkhoz imeni Kirova/Zinkiv Raion	No/deputy head of the Zinkiv Raion ispolkom
24	Reshetylivka	183	Maria Koryachko	chief of weaving workshop/Reshetylivka Crafts Artel imeni Klary Tsetkin	No/deputy head of the Ukrainian Arts Crafting Union (Ukrkhudozhpromspilka) org bureau
24	Poltava urban	184	Fyodor Kuzmin	chief of the Poltava steam locomotive repair plant	No/chief of the Dnipro steam locomotive repair plant
24	Poltava rural	185	Kostiantyn Shchanin	director of the Poltava Agricultural Institute	No/2nd secretary of the Poltava Oblast committee of the CP(b)U
24	Kobelyaky	186	Ivan Martynenko	head of the Verkhovna Rada Presidium OrgCommittee/Poltava Oblast	Yes/head of the Poltava Oblast ispolkom/head of the Sumy Oblast ispolkom
24	Chutove	187	Luka Teslenko	student at the All-Ukrainian Agricultural Communist University imeni Artema/Kharkiv	No/director of the Berezyne soviet farm/head of the Denyshi rural council ispolkom
24	Karlivka	188	Zinoviy Lysanskyi	engineer-mechanic of the Karlivka Sugar Factory	No/engineer-mechanic of the Karlivka Sugar Factory
Notes: District. Electoral districts are not part of the administrative territorial system and may include several territorial units of the Ukrainian regions (raions, cities of regional significance, and others).

==== Dnipropetrovsk Oblast ====
Winners in single-member constituencies
No. of mandates	Electoral District		Candidate	Occupation	Reelected status
No. of mandates	Name	No.	Candidate	Occupation	Reelected status
36	Piatykhatky	189	Mykola Dyomka	train driver-instructor of the Piatykhatky locomotive station depot	No/died in 1944
36	Yezhovsk	190	Andrei Klochkov	chief of militsiya in Ukraine	No/arrested by NKVD/executed
36	Dzerzhynske	191	Vsevolod Chubenko	smelter at the Kryvyi Rih Metallurgical Plant	No/WWII MIA
36	Shyroke	192	Yevdokia Lavrusha	teacher/supervisor of the Kostromske elementary school/Apostolove Raion	No/supervisor of the department of national education/Apostolove Raion
36	Verkhniodniprovsk	193	Nikolay Bogdanov	commander of artillery regiment	No/perished in 1943 at frontlines
36	Sofiivka	194	Andriy Razin	commissar of a battalion	No/deputy commander of the 68th Mechanized Brigade
36	Nikopol	195	Pyotr Korkin	chief of NKVD in region	No/arrested by NKVD/executed
36	Vasylivka	196	Mytrofan Serdyuk	supervisor of a sheep farm/kolkhoz imeni MOPR/Vasylivka Raion	No/head of the kolkhoz imeni MOPR/Vasylivka Raion
36	Vesele, Kryvyi Rih Raion	197	Georgiy Dementyev	chief of land lot directory/Dnipropetrovsk Oblast ispolkom	Yes/acting 1st secretary of the Dnipropetrovsk Oblast committee of the CP(b)U/chairman of the Dnipropetrovsk Oblast ispolkom
36	Henichesk	198	Serafyma Tkachenko	team leader of Zorya kolkhoz/Syvash Raion	No/graduate of the Horodyshche Agricultural Fruit and Berry vocational school
36	Mahdalynivka	199	Ivan Mashko	director of the Dmukhailivka MTS/Kotovka Raion	No/director of the Dnipropetrovsk Oblast department of the "Soyuzzagottrans" trust
36	Amur-Nyzhniodniprovskyi urban	200	Stepan Usenko	1st secretary of the Komsomol of Ukraine	No/arrested by NKVD/executed
36	Amur-Nyzhniodniprovskyi	201	Konstantin Dobrososedov	commander of the 7th Rifle Corps	No/WWII POW during the Battle of Kiev/repatriated to the Soviet Union
36	Zhovtnevyi	202	Serhiy Bukhalo	docent of the Dnipropetrovsk Mining Institute imeni Artema	Yes/Narkom of Education of Ukraine/DerzhPlan staff
36	Kirovskyi	203	Hanna Podushko	2nd secretary of the Krasnohvardiyskyi District of Dnipropetrovsk committee of the CP(b)U	No/1st secretary of the Krasnohvardiyskyi District of Dnipropetrovsk committee of the CP(b)U
36	Krasnohvardiyskyi urban	204	Semen Zodionchenko	1st secretary of the Dnipropetrovsk Oblast committee of the CP(b)U	No/1st deputy minister of procurement of the Soviet Union
36	Krasnohvardiyskyi rural	205	Semen Vasylenko	chief engineer/deputy director of the Dnipropetrovsk Pipe Mill imeni Lenina	No/deputy chairman of the Gosplan of the Soviet Union
36	Dniprodzerzhynsk urban	206	Fyodor Razumov	chief of a steam locomotive depot/Dnieper Metallurgical Plant imeni Dzerzhynskoho	No/chief of a steam locomotive depot/Dnieper Metallurgical Plant imeni Dzerzhynskoho
36	Dniprodzerzhynsk rural	207	Yelizaveta Plotnikova	engineer-chemist/deputy chief of workshop at the Dniprodzerzhynsk nitrogen fertilizers plant	No/deputy head of the Dniprodzerzhynsk city ispolkom and head of the city's planning commission
36	Solone	208	Ivan Velychko	harvester operator for the Chumaky MTS/Tomakivka Raion	No/director of the Myrove MTS
36	Novomoskovsk	209	Anastasia Mospan	pig farmer of the Oborona kolkhoz/Novomoskovsk Raion	No/suprevisor of the Oborona kolkhoz pig farm in Mykolaivka/Novomoskovsk Raion
36	Synelnykove	210	Maria Pipa	head of the Novyi Posyolok rural council/Synelnykove Raion	Yes/director of the Synelnykove Raion branch of the Soviet Gosbank
36	Leninskyi urban	211	Motrona Ryabets	pediatriacian of a child nursery #27/Zaporizhia	Yes/supervisor of the Zaporizhia city department of healthcare
36	Novozaporozkyi	212	Mykola Kompaniyets	chief of the Radnarkom directorate of Arts Affairs	No/head of the Radmin committee of Arts Affairs
36	Tarasoshevchenkivskyi	213	Zakhar Dorofeyev	chairman of the Zaporizhia city council	No/head of the Zaporizhia Oblast ispolkom
36	Stalinskyi	214	Andriy Lezhenko	secretary of the Komunar Factory party committee/Zaporizhia	No/deputy head of the Zaporizhia City ispolkom
36	Melitopol	215	Leonid Korniyets	2nd secretary of the Dnipropetrovsk Oblast committee of the CP(b)U	Yes/first deputy chairman of Radnarkom
36	Pavlohrad	216	Konstantin Karavayev	acting chairman of the Dnipropetrovsk Oblast ispolkom	Yes/chairman of the Odesa Oblast ispolkom
36	Petropavlivka	217	Ivan Zakharkin	chief of staff of the Kiev Military District	No/perished in a car crash in 1944
36	Vasylkivka	218	Pelahia Sosnytska	milkmaid/supervisor of the kolkhoz imeni Karla Marksa milk farm/Pokrovske Raion	Yes/supervisor of the kolkhoz imeni Karla Marksa milk farm/Pokrovske Raion
36	Orikhiv	219	Anastasia Fonyak	pig farmer of the Mayak kolkhoz/Orikhiv Raion	No/arrested by NKVD in 1943/served sentence
36	Velykyi Tokmak	220	Maria Malyarenko	worker of the Factory imeni Kirova/Velykyi Tokmak	No/student of the party school of the CC CP(b)U
36	Novovasylivka	221	Hryhoriy Khomenko	Narkom of Education of Ukraine	No/director of the Rivne Oblast department of people's education
36	Chubarivka	222	Pavlo Davydov	chief of the Stalin Railways	No/arrested by NKVD/executed in 1941
36	Kuibysheve	223	Nikolay Dyatlov	deputy chief of NKVD in region	Yes/deputy minister of Internal Affairs of Ukraine/commander of the NKVD operation "Zapad"
36	Berdyansk	224	Maksym Izotov	smelter of the Factory imeni Pershoho Travnia/Berdyansk	No/controlling master of smelting workshop at the Factory imeni Pershoho Travnia/Berdyansk
Notes: District. Electoral districts are not part of the administrative territorial system and may include several territorial units of the Ukrainian regions (raions, cities of regional significance, and others).

==== Kharkiv Oblast ====
Winners in single-member constituencies
No. of mandates	Electoral District		Candidate	Occupation	Reelected status
No. of mandates	Name	No.	Candidate	Occupation	Reelected status
32	Bilopillia	225	Volodymyr Valuyev	head of Kharkiv Region planning committee/deputy head of ispolkom	Yes/head of DerzhPlan/minister of local and fuel industry
32	Ulianivka	226	Mykola Babchenko	minister of justice	Yes/minister of justice/prosecutor's office
32	Lebedyn	227	Aleksandr Starostin	Air Forces squadron commander/Lebedyn	No/Air Force officer
32	Okhtyrka	228	Petro Karpukhin	Kharkiv Polytechnic Institute head of the department of organic dyes/doctor of technical sciences/academician	No/Kharkiv Polytechnic Institute head of the department of organic dyes/doctor of technical sciences/academician
32	Sumy	229	Grigoriy Kobyzev	chief of NKVD in region	No/arrested/died in the North-Eastern camp
32	Krasnopillia	230	Anton Babenko	3rd secretary of the Kharkiv Oblast committee of the CP(b)U	No/chief of the Kharkiv Oblast Directory of Cinematography/director of the Kharkiv House of Teacher/ head of personnel department of the Kharkiv Machine Tool Plant
32	Trostianets	231	Mikhail Olonov	chief of the Southern Railway political department	No/chief of the South-Sakhalin Railway/deputy chief of the Central Directorate of Educational Institutions of the Ministry of Railways
32	Krasnokutsk	232	Kateryna Dvornyk	head of the Kolomak Raion department of public education	No/head of the Leninskiy Raion department of public education/Kharkiv
32	Zolochiv	233	Fedir Lutsenko	deputy narkom of land cultivation	No/deputy minister of land cultivation/senior researcher of the Conjuncture Research Institute of the Soviet Ministry of Foreign Trade
32	Bohodukhiv	234	Petro Aheyenko	head surgeon of the Vilshany hospital/Derhachi Raion	Yes/surgeon of the first city clinical hospital imeni V.Lenina/Kharkiv
32	Valky	235	Andriy Shmalko	2nd secretary of the Kharkiv Oblast committee of the CP(b)U/jailed	No/secretary of the Mykolaiv Oblast committee/head of department of Marxism–Leninism of the Kharkiv Agricultural Institute/docent in the Kharkiv Medical Institute and the Kharkiv Aviation Institute
32	Krasnohrad	236	Andriy Kalyuzhnyi	head of kolkhoz "Nove Zhyttia"/Khrestyshche, Krasnohrad Raion	No/head of kolkhoz "Vilna Pratsia"/Novomykhailivka, Krasnohrad Raion
32	Sakhnovshchyna	237	Klavdiya Herasymenko	seed-agronomist Lihovsk MTS/Sakhnovshchyna Raion	Yes/director of Karlivka MTS, Karlivka repair station, and Karlivka Raion agricultural equipment
32	Kharkiv-Leninskyi	238	Zinayida Reminna	head of the children's tailoring unit of the Krupskaya shop of the Tynyakov sewing factory/Kharkiv	Yes/party cell secretary of the Tynyakov sewing factory
32	Kharkiv-Chervonobavarskyi	239	Kateryna Kharchenko	head of the rope welding shop of the Petrovsky rope factory/Kharkiv	No/uncertain
32	Kharkiv-Chervonozavodskyi	240	Viktor Savchenko	patternmaker of the Comintern factory/ Kharkiv	No/uncertain/member of the National Union of Artists of Ukraine
32	Kharkiv-Zhovtnevyi	241	Ivan Bobrov	acting chairman of the Kharkiv City Council	No/head of ispolkom of the Drohobych city council
32	Kharkiv-Stalinskyi	242	Ivan Voskov	secretary of the Kharkiv city committee of the CP(b)U	No/director of the Porshen factory/Kharkiv
32	Kharkiv-Kaganovychskyi	243	Petro Striletskyi	director of the Serp and Molot factory/Kharkiv	No/director of the electrical equipment factory/Kharkiv
32	Kharkiv-Dzerzhinskyi	244	Dmitrii Sintsov	director of the Mathematics and Mechanics Institute of the Kharkiv University/Kharkiv	No/director of the Mathematics and Mechanics Institute of the Kharkiv University/Kharkiv
32	Kharkiv-Ordzhonikidzevskyi	245	Oleksandr Kramov	art director of the Kharkiv State Theater of Russian Drama	Yes/art director of the Kharkiv State Theater of Russian Drama
32	Kharkiv-rural 1	246	Ilya Smirnov	troop commander of the Kharkiv Military District	Yes/troop commander of the Lviv Military District and Gorkiy Military District
32	Kharkiv-rural 2	247	Mykhailo Hrechukha	acting secretary of Kharkiv Oblast committee of the CP(b)U	Yes/chairman of the Presidium of the Verkhovna Rada/deputy chairman of the Council of Ministers
32	Zmiiv	248	Ivan Ovsiyenko	narkom of healthcare	No/director of the Kharkiv Medical Academy of Post-graduate Education
32	Lozova	249	Pavlo Sarana	locomotive depot driver of the Lozova station	No/chief of the steam locomotive department at the Lozova station
32	Vovchansk	250	Kharytyna Rylska	milkmaid of the Lenin kolkhoz/Novooleksandrivka, Vovchansk Raion	No/director of the hatchery station/Vovchansk
32	Chuhuiv	251	Mykhailo Horlachenko	commander of the 4th light bomber aviation regiment/Kharkiv Military District	No/commander of the Volga Military District/special envoy to China in 1951–1953
32	Balakliya	252	Filipp Yershakov	deputy commander of the Kharkiv Military District troops	No/war POW in 1941/died in Oflag XIII-D/Hammelburg
32	Barvinkove	253	Aleksandr Osipov	1st secretary of the Kharkiv Oblast committee of the CP(b)U	No/arrested in 1939, released in 1947/arrested again in 1948, released in 1954/"rehabilitated"
32	Velykyi Burluk	254	Mykola Prokopenko	acting head of the Kharkiv Oblast ispolkom	No/declared "missing in action"
32	Kupiansk	255	Petro Kolesnykov	1st secretary of the Kupiansk Raion committee of the CP(b)U	No/head of the building committee of the 3rd construction department of the reconstruction of the KhTZ
32	Izyum	256	Leonid Yachenin	acting prosecutor of Ukraine	No/military prosecutor of the North Caucasus Military District
Notes: District. Electoral districts are not part of the administrative territorial system and may include several territorial units of the Ukrainian regions (raions, cities of regional significance, and others).

==== Donets Oblast ====
Winners in single-member constituencies
No. of mandates	Electoral District		Candidate	Occupation	Reelected status
No. of mandates	Name	No.	Candidate	Occupation	Reelected status
48	Dobropillia	257	Yevdokia Kovalyova	team leader of the kolkhoz imeni Lenina/Lenine, Krasnoarmiyske Raion	Yes/head of the kolkhoz imeni Lenina, head of the Lenine rural council ispolkom/Lenine, Dobropillia Raion
48	Krasnoarmiyske	258	Ivan Brydko	head of the mine section #5-6 imeni Dymytrova/Krasnoarmiyskvuhillia association/Dymytrov	No/head of the mine section #5-6 imeni Dymytrova/Krasnoarmiyskvuhillia association/Dymytrov
48	Marinka	259	Mariya Fomenko	harvester driver of the Bohoyavlenska MTS/Novoukrainka, Marinka Raion	No/head of the Novoukrainka rural council ispolkom
48	Krasnyi Lyman	260	Hanna Oleinikova	head of the kolkhoz "12th Anniversary of October"/Krasnyi Lyman Raion	No/director of the state farm imeni Kirova/Kirove, Krasnyi Lyman Raion
48	Sloviansk	261	Mariya Tsynkalenko	shop chief of the armature-insulator factory imeni Artema/Sloviansk	No/head of the factory party cell at the factory
48	Kramatorsk	262	Mykhailo Drozhyn	1st secretary of the Kramatorsk city committee of the CP(b)U	No/2nd secretary of the Chernihiv Oblast committee of the CP(b)U/chief of the economic directory of the Ministry of Internal Affairs
48	Kostiantynivka	263	Kseniya Savenko	dean of the middle school #4/Kostniantynivka	No/dean of the methodical office of the Kostiantynivka city education directory
48	Kostiantynivka-Druzhkivka	264	Makar Ruban	steam locomotive depot driver/Sloviansk, Donets Railway	No/jobless, handicapped of the 2nd category
48	Dzerzhynsk	265	Stepan Ryaboshapka	instructor of the Stakhnovite methods of work at the mine imeni Dzerzhinskogo/Dzerzhynsk	No/died in evacuation in 1942
48	Stalino	266	Aleksandr Shcherbakov	1st secretary of the Donets-Stalino Obalst committee of the CP(b)U	No/died in 1945 from alcohol poisoning
48	Stalino-Kuibyshevskyi	267	Mykola Kasaurov	director of the Kuibyshevugol trust	No/chief of the mine #22-6 imeni Kirova/Kirovugol trust, Luhanskvuhillia mining association/deputy director of the Kadiivkaugol trust
48	Stalino-Zavodskyi	268	Nikifor Sidorov	master-roller of condition "350" rail of the rolling shop of the Stalino metallurgical factory imeni Stalina	No/died in 1943 in evacuation
48	Stalino-Petrivskyi	269	Mykola Sobchenko	lifting machine operator of the mine #17-17 bis/Rutchenkove	No/deputy director of the mine administration #7 of the Rutchenkoveugol trust/Rutchenkove
48	Stalino-Petrivskyi	270	Ivan Sevastyanov	doctor of the Rutchenkove hospital/Stalino	Yes/chief of the Kirovskyi Raion department of healthcare/Stalino
48	Volnovakha	271	Petro Shpylevyi	acting head of the Donets-Stalino Oblast ispolkom	No/arrested in 1939 as the enemy of people, released in 1942/arrested in 1948, convicted to 10 years in GULAG in 1949, released in 1955/"rehabilitated"
48	Mariupol-urban	272	Pavel Chistov	chief of NKVD in the Donets-Stalino Oblast	No/WWII POW/liberated by American troops and handed over to the Soviet Union/arrested and convicted for collaboration in 1946, served time in the Russian Far East, released in 1956/worked as an accountant
48	Mariupol-Illichivskyi	273	Mykyta Puzyryov	steelworker-instructor of the Mariupol metallurgical factory imeni Lenina	No/executed in 1941 by Nazis
48	Mariupol-rural	274	Melaniya Zimenko	team leader of the kolkhoz imeni Chubar/Krasnoarmiyske, Budyonny Raion	No/director of a milk factory/Budyonny Raion
48	Svatove	275	Oleksandra Vyshnychenko	1st secretary of the Pokrovske Raion committee of the CP(b)U	No/secretary of the Kremenets City committee of the CP(b)U
48	Rubizhne	276	Pyotr Lyubavin	1st secretary of the Voroshilovgrad Oblast committee of the CP(b)U/3rd secretary of the Dnipropetrovsk Oblast committee of the CP(b)U	No/committed suicide to avoid being the WWII POW
48	Lysychansk	277	Vasyl Ohnennyi	2nd secretary of the LKSMU	No/arrested by NKVD in 1938/fate is unknown
48	Artemivsk	278	Ivan Lukashov	narkom of trade of Ukrainian SSR	Yes/minister of trade of Ukrainian SSR/deputy minister of food industry of the Soviet Union/minister of trade of Russian SFSR
48	Popasna	279	Pavlo Matviyenko	dispatcher of the operation department of the Popasna train station imeni Kaganovicha	No/MIA
48	Horlivka-urban	280	Oleksandr Stepanenko	secretary of the party cell of the Kocheharka mine #1/Horlivka	No/1st secretary of the Prokopyevsk City committee of the VCP(b)/director of the regional Kemerovugol trust
48	Horlivka-rural	281	Ivan Ionin	dean of the educational department of the Stalin Medical Institute/Doctor of Medical Sciences	No/died from diseases in 1945
48	Ordzhonikidze-urban	282	Ilya Tyutyunnikov	chief of the "Yunyi komunar" mine	No/chief of the mine administration #2 "Krasnyi Profintern" of the Ordzhonikidzeugol trust/Donetskvuhillia
48	Ordzhonikidze-rural	283	Mariya Afonina	shift foreman of the Debaltseve railway station	No/senior engineer of railcar service for the Railways of the South/Ministry (People's Commissariat) of Communication Routes of the Soviet Union
48	Makiivka-Kirovskyi	284	Andriy Byelich	rolling mill metallurgist of the Makiivka metallurgical plant imeni Kirova	No/head of the rolling shop shift of the Makiivka metallurgical plant imeni Kirova
48	Makiivka-urban	285	Olena Prokofyeva	physician-surgeon of the Makiivka Raion hospital	No/chief physician of the Makiivka City hospital
48	Makiivka-southern	286	Ivan Korobov	senior foreman of the blast furnace shop of the Makiivka metallurgical plant imeni Kirova	No/people's deputy of the Supreme Soviet of the Soviet Union
48	Khartsyzk	287	Arseniy Stepanov	acting head of the Central Council of the Osoaviakhim of the Ukrainian SSR	No/fate is unknown
48	Amvrosiivka	288	Nataliya Radchenko	foreman of the women's tractor brigade/Pokrovo-Kireyevske MTS, Starobesheve Raion	No/executed by Nazis in 1942 in Starobesheve
48	Bilokurakyne	289	Mikhail Kvasov	head of the department of leading party bodies of the CC CP(b)U	No/chief of political department of the Ukhta-Izhora camp/chief of political department of the Polyana directory of camps in Krasnoyarsk/chief of the Polyana camp department of the Ministry of Internal Affairs of the Russian SFSR
48	Starobilsk	290	Paraskoviya Ponomarenko	senior agronomist of the Novo-Astrakhan Raion land zoning department	No/instructor at the agricultural department of the Voroshilovgrad Oblast committee of the CP(b)U
48	Sergo	291	Mykola Hvozdyrkov	foreman of the mine imeni Kirova of the Kirovugol trust/Holubivka	No/executed by the Nazis in 1943
48	Sergo-Bryanka	292	Mikhail Ignatov	head of the Sergo city council	No/1st secretary of the Kadiivka city committee of the CP(b)U/people's deputy of the Supreme Soviet of the Soviet Union
48	Voroshilovsk-urban	293	Mikhail Kudryavtsev	master of rolling mill "500" shop of the Voroshilovsk metallurgic plant imeni Voroshilova	No/head of the industrial and transport department of the Voroshilovsk City Committee of the CP(b)U
48	Voroshilovsk-rural	294	Mykhailo Shevchenko	1st secretary of the Voroshilovsk city committee of the CP(b)U	No/2nd secretary of the Sumy city committee of the CP(b)U
48	Chystiakove	295	Yelyzaveta Moskvina	head of mechanical workshops of the "Chistiakovantratsit" trust	No/director of the Khanzhenkov auto repair plant/Makiivka
48	Krasnyi Luch	296	Kateryna Krykunova	electric locomotive driver of the mine #7-8 of the "Donbassantratsit" trust	No/deputy head of the labor supply department of the mine #7-8 of the "Donbassantratsit" trust
48	Bilovodsk	297	Volodymyr Kozyumynskyi	head of the kolkhoz "Chervonyi partyzan"/khutir Veselyi, Bilovodsk Raion	No/director of the Bilovodsk Industrial Association (Combine)
48	Stanytsia Luhanska	298	Andriy Kozlov	aviation squadron commissar of the 11th school of military pilots/Voroshilovgrad	No/the Kiev Military District air force commander assistant
48	Voroshilovgrad-Artemivskyi	299	Petro Bohynia	chairman of the Organizational Committee of the Presidium of the Verkhovna Rada of the Ukrainian SSR	No/arrested in July 1938 for belonging to a counter revolutionary organization, released in 1940 due to lack of evidences/died in October 1944
48	Voroshilovgrad-Zhovtnevyi	300	Mykola Chumychev	director of the Voroshilovgrad steal locomotive factory	No/arrested in September 1938 for spying and diversion activities, released in 1940/director of the Ural Factory of Heavy Engineering/director of the Mykolaiv Pipe Factory
48	Krasnodon	301	Oleksiy Vorobyov	master foundry of the Krasnodon electromechanical shop	No/master foundry of the Krasnodon electromechanical shop
48	Bokove-Antratsyt	302	Ivan Molostov	manager of the mine #22/53, Bokovoatratsit trust	No/chief of the administration of smaller mines of the Donbassantratsit trust/Krasnyi Luch
48	Snizhne	303	Nikolay Kretov	operator of the cutting machine of the mine imeni Stalina, Snezhnoeantratsit trust	No/chief of the mine administration #6, Snezhnoeantratsit trust
48	Rovenky	304	Yelyzaveta Biryukova	director of the Rovenky middle school #2	No/director of the Voroshilovgrad Oblast Institute for Teacher Improvement
Notes: District. Electoral districts are not part of the administrative territorial system and may include several territorial units of the Ukrainian regions (raions, cities of regional significance, and others).

=== Elected in 1940 ===
==== Volyn Oblast ====
Winners in single-member constituencies
No. of mandates	Electoral District		Candidate	Occupation	Reelected status
No. of mandates	Name	No.	Candidate	Occupation	Reelected status
11	Liuboml	305	Semen Denysyuk	head of the Berezhtsi volost ispolkom/Liuboml Raion	No/deputy chairman of the Liuboml Raion council ispolkom
11	Ratne	306	Avksentiy Shynkaruk	head of the Orikhove rural council/Ratne Raion	No/stayed in Ratne
11	Turiysk	307	Zynayida Beshta	head of the Harusha rural council/Turiysk Raion	No/head of the social security department of the Turiysk Raion council
11	Kovel	308	Meyer Shprynher	train station attendant/Kovel railway station	No/director of the Lutsk brewery
11	Torchyn	309	Hryhoriy Honcharov	head of the Bilostok rural council/Torchyn Raion	No/courses on the preparation of the Soviet asset/Kharkiv
11	Kivertsi	310	Ivan Sovetnikov	commander of the 5th Army/Kiev Military District	No/troops assistant commander of the Carpathian Military District
11	Manevychi	311	Andriy Mizyuk	deputy head of the Kolky Raion ispolkom	Yes/1st secretary of the Turiysk Raion committee of the CP(b)U/chairman of the Volyn Oblast council ispolkom/chairman of the Lutsk City council ispolkom/chairman of the Volyn Oblast council of professional unions/head of the department of social security of the Volyn Oblast council
11	Volodymyr	312	Ilarion Yukhno	the head of the organizational group for the organization of the collective farm in the village of Selets	No/fate is unknown
11	Horokhiv	313	Yaryna Khomchyk	a middle-class peasant woman from Staryky village/Berestechko Raion	Yes/chairman of the Berestechko City council ispolkom
11	Lutsk	314	Fedir Sadoshenko	2nd secretary of the Lutsk city committee of the CP(b)U	No/2nd secretary and 1st secretary of the Lutsk city committee of the CP(b)U/chairman of the Volyn Oblast council of professional unions
11	Kamin-Kashyrskyi	315	Leonid Klymuk	head of the Polytsi rural council/Kamin-Kashyrskyi Raion	No/chairman of the Kamin-Kashyrskyi city council
Notes: District. Electoral districts are not part of the administrative territorial system and may include several territorial units of the Ukrainian regions (raions, cities of regional significance, and others).

==== Drohobych Oblast ====
Winners in single-member constituencies
No. of mandates	Electoral District		Candidate	Occupation	Reelected status
No. of mandates	Name	No.	Candidate	Occupation	Reelected status
13	Dobromyl	316	Vasyl Shevchyk	head of the Yamna Dolishnia village council/Dobromyl Raion	No/killed by Poles in 1946
13	Ustryky Dolishni	317	Mykhailo Fihas	deputy director of the Ustryky Dolishni oil industry/Vankovo-Ropenky	Yes/head of the planning commission of the Dobromyl Raion council/chairman of the Dobromyl Raion council ispolkom
13	Turka	318	Hanna Linynska	deputy chairman of the Strilky Raion ispolkom	Yes/deputy chairman of the Strilky Raion ispolkom/secretary of the Strilky Raion committee of the CP(b)U
13	Skole	319	Mariya Hisiak	director of the Stryi middle school #10	No/deputy head of the Stryi city ispolkom for social security/head of the Stryi city department of public education
13	Boryslav	320	Mykola Ilnytskyi	head of the 5th section of the "Ukrnaftovydobutok" oil industry	No/fate is unknown after evacuation and arrest by NKVD
13	Stryi	321	Lavrentiy Dychko	foreman of the carpentry shop of the Stryi locomotive repair plant	No/deputy chairman for labor force mobilization of the Stryi city council ispolkom
13	Khodoriv	322	Stepan Semyhenivskyi	head of Khodoriv Raion health care department	No/fate is unknown after 1941
13	Mykolaiv	323	Pavlo Zayika	3rd secretary of the Drohobych Oblast committee of the CP(b)U	No/perished in 1942 as the head of the political department of the 45th Rifle Division near Stary Oskol
13	Drohobych	324	Yaroslav Sereda	chief engineer of Drohobych Oil Refinery No. 1	Yes/chief engineer and deputy head of the "Ukrnaftozavody" trust in Drohobych/deputy chairman of the Lviv branch presidium of the Academy of Sciences of the Ukrainian SSR for scientific work/head of the oil refining laboratory of the Academy of Sciences of the Ukrainian SSR in Lviv/head of the sulfonate chemistry sector of the Lviv branch of "Ukrdnipronafta"
13	Sambir	325	Oleksiy Zahorodnyi	2nd secretary of the Drohobych Oblast committee of the CP(b)U	No/perished in 1941 as the military commissar of artillery supply for the South-Western Front headquarters
13	Rudky	326	Vasyl Muzyka	head of the Hoshany rural council, Rudky Raion/deputy chairman of the Rudky Raion ispolkom	No/deputy chairman of the Rudky Raion ispolkom/killed by unknown in 1945
13	Mostyska	327	Mykhailo Tarapatskyi	head of the Kalnykiv rural council/head of kolkhoz imeni Lenina, Kalnykiv	No/deputy chairman of the Mostyska Raion ispolkom
13	Peremyshl	328	Mykhailyna Stadnytska	a peasant of Koniusha village, Peremyshl Raion	No/head of the social security department and deputy chairman of the Nyzhankovychi Raion Council ispolkom
Notes: District. Electoral districts are not part of the administrative territorial system and may include several territorial units of the Ukrainian regions (raions, cities of regional significance, and others).

==== Lviv Oblast ====
Winners in single-member constituencies
No. of mandates	Electoral District		Candidate	Occupation	Reelected status
No. of mandates	Name	No.	Candidate	Occupation	Reelected status
16	Liubachiv	329	Ivan Stadnyk	head of the Dakhniv village council/Liubachiv Raion	No/fate is unknown since 1941
16	Yavoriv	330	Grigoriy Zakharichev	member of the 6th Army military council/brigade commissar (kombrig)	No/deputy head of the political department of the Military Pedagogical Institute of the Soviet Army
16	Rava-Ruska	331	Mykhailo Vozniak	professor of the Lviv State University imeni Franka	No/headed the department of Ukrainian literature of the Institute of Social Sciences of the Academy of Sciences of the Ukrainian SSR and headed the department of Ukrainian literature
16	Radekhiv	332	Yosyp Stadnyk	deputy director of the Lviv State Ukrainian Drama Theater imeni Lesi Ukrainky	No/director of the "Theater of Miniature [Plays]" in Lviv/repressed by the "liberating" Soviet regime and exiled to Uglich
16	Zhovkva	333	Lina Fliakevych	teacher of the Liubelia rural school/Velyki Mosty Raion	No/director of the Liubelia rural school
16	Horodok	334	Ivan Kravets	head of the Zavydovychi village council/Horodok Raion	No/head of the Horodok Raion council ispolkom
16	Lviv-rural	335	Pavlo Kharchenko	head of the Sknyliv village council/Lviv Rural Raion	No/fate is unknown since 1941
16	Kamianka-Strumilovska	336	Stepan Rykhva	head of the Silets-Benkiv village council/Kamianka-Strumilovska Raion	No/head of the social security department of the Kamianka-Buzka Raion council ispolkom
16	Brody	337	Mykola Matsko	2nd secretary of the Lviv Oblast committee of the CP(b)U	No/deputy managing director of the "Khreshchatykbud" trust in Kyiv
16	Olevsk	338	Kateryna Savchuk	head of the rural consumer society in Sasiv/Olesk Raion	No/head of the social security department and deputy chairman of the Olesk Raion council ispolkom
16	Zolochiv	339	Petro Franko	professor of the Lviv State Institute of Soviet Trade	No/fate is unclear/repressed by NKVD in 1941
16	Peremyshliany	340	Mykhailo Kushnir	head of the Korelychi peasant committee	No/deputy chairman of the Peremyshliany Raion council ispolkom
16	Lviv-Stalinskyi	341	Fedir Yeremenko	head of the Lviv city council	No/2nd secretary of the Lviv City committee of the CP(b)U/deputy chairman of the Lviv Oblast council ispolkom/head of the Lviv Oblast department of road transport and highways
16	Lviv-Chervonoarmiyskyi	342	Borys Kolesnichenko	2nd secretary of the Lviv City committee of the CP(b)U	No/died in January 1941
16	Lviv-Shevchenkivskyi	343	Oleksandr Karmazin	deputy head of the Lviv city council	No/fate is unknown since 1941
16	Lviv-Zaliznychnyi	344	Helena Kuzminska	deputy director of the Lviv confectionery factory imeni Kirova	No/deputy director of the Lviv confectionery factory imeni Kirova
Notes: District. Electoral districts are not part of the administrative territorial system and may include several territorial units of the Ukrainian regions (raions, cities of regional significance, and others).

== See also ==
- Politburo of the 17th Congress of the All-Union Communist Party (Bolsheviks) 1934 – 1939
