= Ivanopil =

Ivanopil (Ukrainian: Іванопіль) is an inhabited locality in Ukraine and it may refer to:

- Ivanopil, a rural settlement in Berdychiv Raion, Zhytomyr Oblast
- Ivanopil, a village in Lityn Raion, Vinnytsia Oblast
- Ivanopil, a village in Korosten Raion, Zhytomyr Oblast
