= David Bushmich =

Soviet-Ukrainian ophthalmologist (1902–1995)

David Bishmich
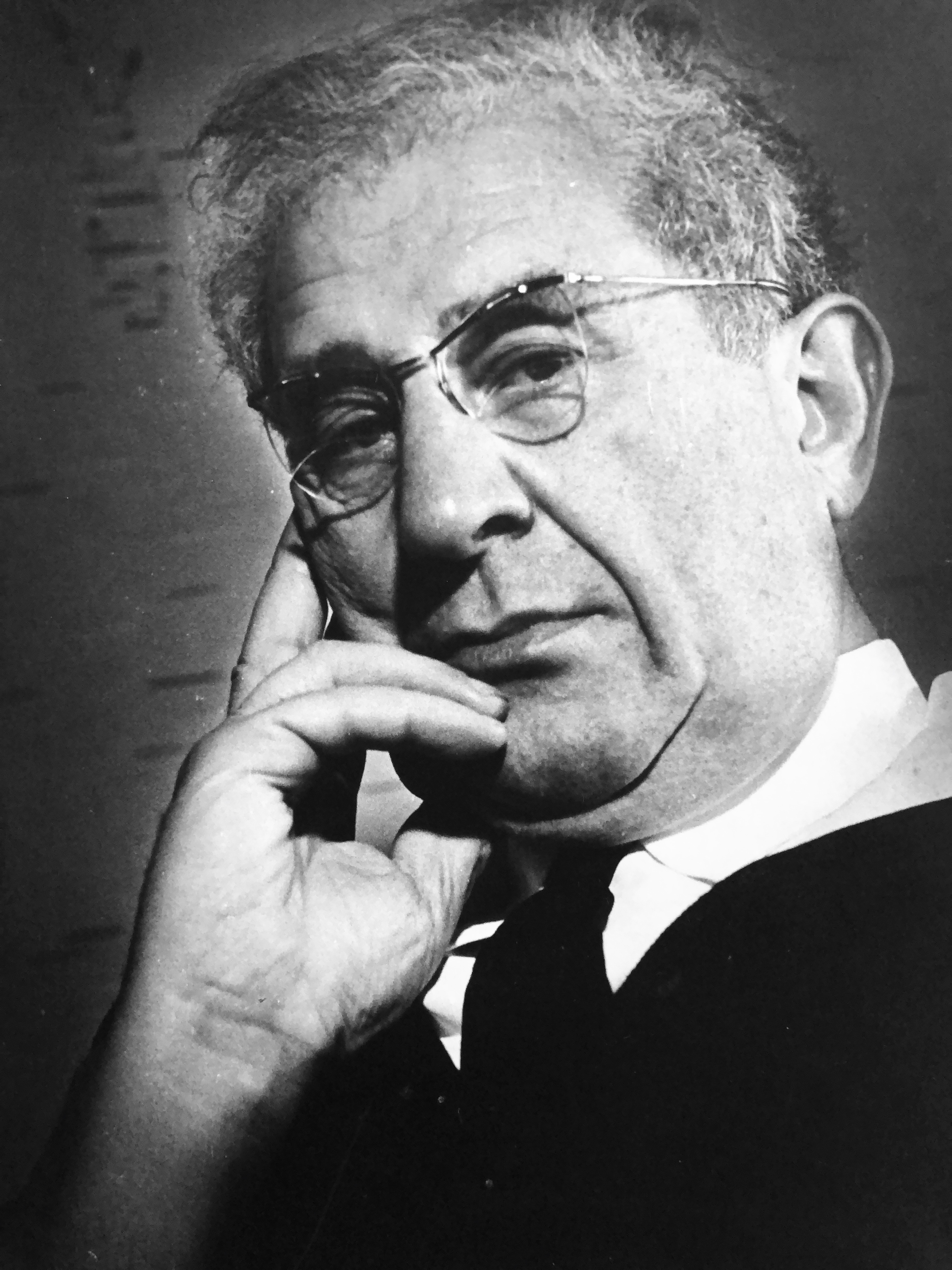
- Born: March 27, 1902
- Died: 1995

David Gregorievich Bushmich (March 27, 1902 - 1995; pronounced Gregor-eh-vitch Bush-mitch) was a Soviet-Ukrainian ophthalmologist who invented the layered cornea transplantation technique. He also invented specialized tools for the technique of layered cornea transplantation.

== Early life end education ==
David Bushmich was born March 27, 1902, in Yelisavetgrad, Russian Empire (present-day Kropyvnytskyi in Ukraine), as the 4th child of Gersh-Leib and Hanna Bushmich. He graduated from Odessa State Medical University in 1925 and worked there until 1929 in the ward of eye diseases under the direction of Vladimir Filatov. He was put in charge of the ophthalmology department in the city of Sloviansk from 1929 to 1935. After this, he was the assistant of the director of eye disease ward in Kharkiv Medical Institute, in Ukraine).

== Career ==
From 1939 until 1976, Bushmich worked in the Ukrainian Institute of Eye Disease and Tissue Therapy as the director of the division for transplantation of the cornea, and then became the director of the clinical department.

During World War II, from 1941 to 1944, he worked at evacuation-hospitals, where he saved the sight of thousands of wounded soldiers. He then worked as the senior scientist for the Turkmenistan Medical Institute. In 1937, he defended the candidate dissertation on the topic of "Determination of localized changes within the eye depth", and in 1958, after multiple attempts to overcome antisemitism, particularly having complications related to the Doctors' plot, he defended a doctorate dissertation titled Clinical Partial Transplantation of the Cornea. In 1961 he earned the title of Professor. He emigrated to the United States in 1990, and died October 24, 1995, in Flushing, Queens, New York.

Bushmich is the author of more than 170 scientific works on various problems associated with ophthalmology. His most notable contribution to the field came from inventing the layered cornea transplantation technique. He also invented specialized tools for the technique of layered cornea transplantation.

Bushmich's main professional interests revolved around the restoration of eyesight for patients with leukoma (a dense white opacity in the cornea of the eye) and its etiology (origin). He investigated various approaches to dealing with leukoma, developed a classification system which is used by ophthalmologists today.

Bushmich retired in 1976. He immigrated to New York City with his family in 1990.
