= Kateryna Boloshkevich =

Ukrainian weaver and statesperson

- Катерина Болошкевич
- Born: Kateryna Ivanivna Boloshkevich; 19 May 1939; Hlybochytsia, Zhytomyr Raion, Zhytomyr Oblast, Ukrainian SSR, Soviet Union
- Died: 28 March 2018 (aged 78); Ukraine
- Occupations: Weaver; Statesperson
- Years active: 1961–2018
- Awards: Order of Lenin (x2); Order of the Red Banner of Labour; Hero of Socialist Labour "Hammer and Sickle" gold medal

Kateryna Ivanivna Boloshkevich (Ukrainian: Катерина Іванівна Болошкевич; 19 May 1939 – 28 March 2018) was a Ukrainian weaver and statesperson who was a weaver at the Zhytomyr flax mill of the Ministry of Light Industry of the Ukrainian SSR and an elected deputy of the ninth convocation of the Supreme Soviet of the Ukrainian Soviet Socialist Republic. Previously, she worked at the Zhytomyr meat processing plant after she graduated from high school. Boloshkevich was a delegate to the 24th Congress of the Communist Party of the Soviet Union, the 20th Congress of the Communist Party of Ukraine and was on the Central Audit Commission of the Communist Party of Ukraine. She was a two-time recipient of the Order of Lenin and got the Order of the Red Banner of Labour, the Hero of Socialist Labour and the "Hammer and Sickle" gold medal.

== Biography ==
On 19 May 1939, Boloshkevich was born into a family of a collective farmer in the village of Hlybochytsia, Zhytomyr Raion, Zhytomyr Oblast, Ukraine. Following her graduation from high school, she worked at the Zhytomyr meat processing plant. From 1961, Boloshkevich worked at the building of the Zhytomyr flax mill of the Ministry of Light Industry of the Ukrainian SSR. She visited the factory with other young girls to become acquainted with weaving and she was one of the first workers at the factory when it commenced operations as the most powerful of its time. During the ninth five-year plan, Boloshevich produced 6,798 linear meters of fabric, which twice exceeded the planned objective. She became the initiator of a movement to expand service areas to transport fabric, bringing the number of service machines from 24 to 36 instead of the usual 12 that improved labour productivity, for which she received a great amount of support from other weavers. She made 800,000 linear meters of linen fabrics in excess of the planned target during the tenth five-year plan. Boloshkevich taught weavers from other factories, while continuining to work at the plant until her retirement.

She became a member of the Communist Party of the Soviet Union in 1967. Boloshkevich took an active part in public life, serving as an elected deputy of the ninth convocation of the Supreme Soviet of the Ukrainian Soviet Socialist Republic. She was a delegate to the 24th Congress of the Communist Party of the Soviet Union and the 20th Congress of the Communist Party of Ukraine. At the 25th Congress of the Communist Party of Ukraine, Boloshevich was elected to the Central Audit Commission.

== Personal life ==
She was resident of the city of Zhytomyr, Ukraine and died on 28 March 2018.

== Awards ==
Boloshkevich was awarded the Order of the Red Banner of Labour on 5 April 1971. She was a two-time recipient of the Order of Lenin: Boloshevich first received the award on 20 February 1974 and again on 12 May 1977 with the title of Hero of Socialist Labour and the "Hammer and Sickle" gold medal "for outstanding success in fulfilling the plan for 1976 and accepted socialist obligations, achieving the highest labor productivity in the industry, personal contribution to increasing the production of high-quality consumer goods, great creative work on communist education and professional training young workers". In 1972, she received the Best Worker, light industry of the USSR medal "for her high labor performance" in which she made 98,000 metres of fabric.
