= Hlybochytsia =

Rural locality in Zhytomyr Oblast, Ukraine

Hlybochytsia Глибочиця
- Village
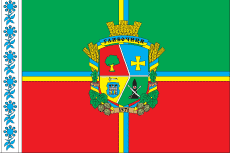
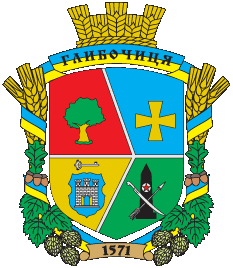
- Flag Coat of arms

- Location within Zhytomyr Oblast Location within Ukraine
- Coordinates: 50°16′45″N 28°46′36″E
- Country: Ukraine
- Oblast: Zhytomyr Oblast
- Raion: Zhytomyr Raion
- Hromada: Hlybochytsia rural hromada
- First mentioned: 1571

Population (2001)
  - Total: 2,726
- Postal code: 12403

Hlybochytsia (Ukrainian: Глибочиця) is a village in Zhytomyr Raion of Zhytomyr Oblast (oblast of Ukraine) with a population of 2,726 (2001). Until 1946, the village was known as Vatskiv. Hlybochytsia hosts the administration of Hlybochytsia rural hromada, one of the hromadas of Ukraine.

== Geography ==
Hlybochytsia is located just east of Zhytomyr along the Kyiv highway towards Korostyshiv and not too far from the Zhytomyr International Airport.

== History ==
The village was first mentioned in 1571. In 1616, the populated place was known as Waczkov Sloboda, which points that it was a certain type of place known as sloboda. In the Soviet historical publications, it was believed that the village was created sometime in the 18th century (possibly related to the partitions of Poland). The settlement appeared around a local tavern on a road to Kyiv, which, supposedly, was owned by Vatsko. The small settlement was associated with the Zhytomyr Castle (Castrum).

On 20 March 1845, the settlement accounted for 43 people (8-10 buildings) and, besides the tavern, it did not have any other social institutions, not even a church.

During the Stolypin agricultural reform in 1907-1910, hops began to be cultivated in the village. Already in 1903 in the neighboring Zhytomyr, the Volhynian Hop Growing Society was established, which vouched for the Volhynian Gubernatorial Zemstvo (regional administration) to establish the first experimental hop farm.

In the 1920s, the village was secured by the Soviet regime. In 1930, the first collective farm "Den Vrozhayu" (Day of Harvest) was established. The next year, another collective farm, "Nezamozhnyk" (Poor farmer), appeared. In September 1933, the village was placed on the "Black Board" list (Blacklisting (Soviet policy)), and no less than 93 people died from Holodomor.

In 1939, the Den Vrozhayu collective farm participated in the All-Union Agricultural Exhibition in Moscow.

Following the World War II, on 7 June 1946, the village was renamed as Hlybochytsia and was one of hundreds of settlements that was on the list to be renamed. During the World War II, at least 261 residents of Hlybochytsia took part in the war on the Soviet side and no less than 90 has perished.

In 1953, the local collective farm took part in another All-Union Agricultural Exhibition in Moscow.

In 1959, there was established the Hlybochytsia rural council, which united several neighboring villages including Hlybochytsia as well. Along with that, all collective farms located on the territory of the new rural council were merged as the "Budivnyk komunizmu" (Communism builder) collective farm.

== Notable people ==
- Kateryna Boloshkevich, Ukrainian career weaver and stateswoman
