= Ľubeľa =

- Municipality
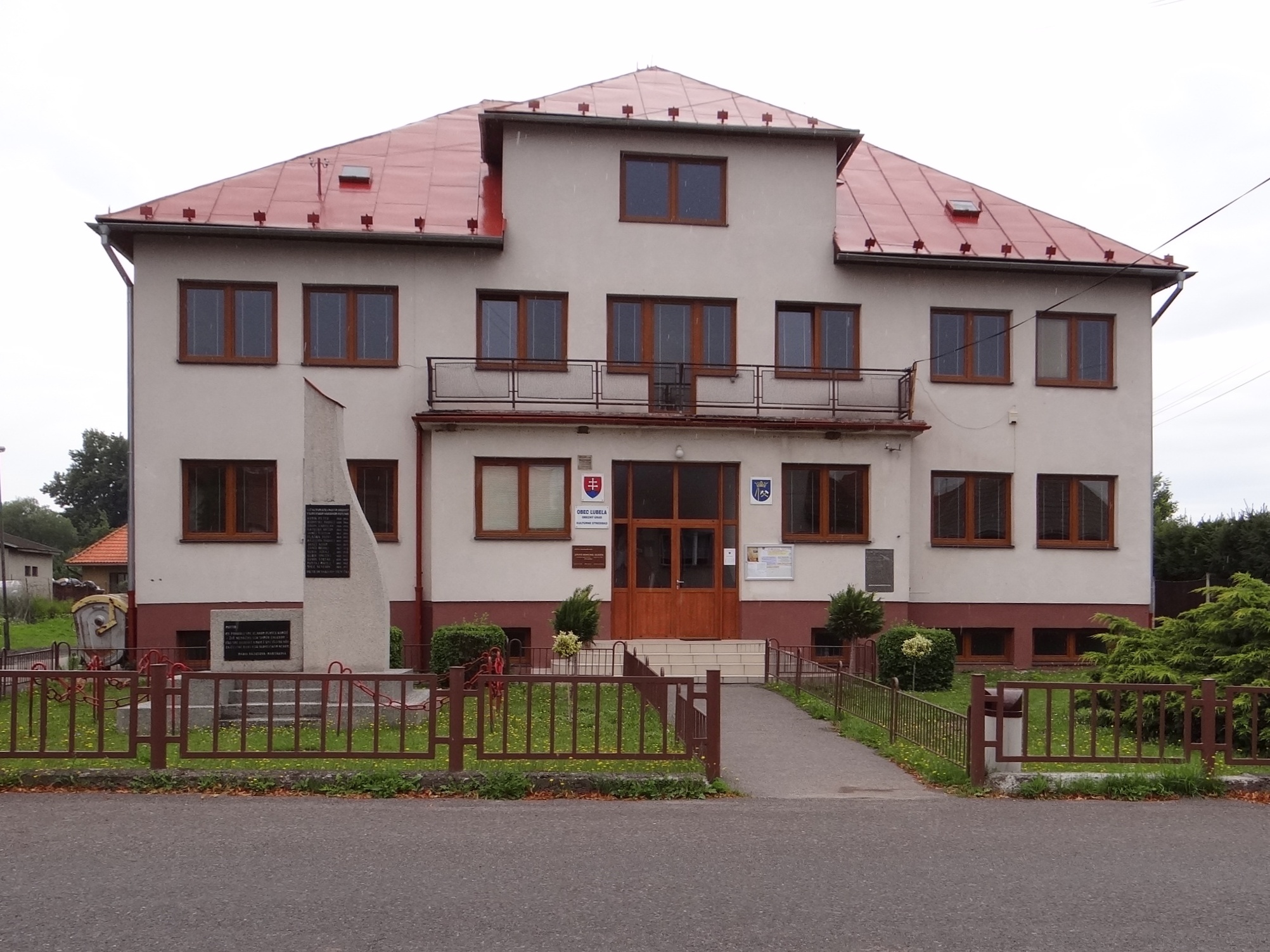

- Flag

- Location of Ľubeľa in the Žilina Region Location of Ľubeľa in Slovakia
- Coordinates: 49.05°N 19.48°E
- Country: Slovakia
- Region: Žilina Region
- District: Liptovský Mikuláš District
- First mentioned: 1278

Government
  - Mayor: Erik Gemzick (Hlas)

Area
  - Total: 17.45 km^{2} (6.74 sq mi)
- Elevation: 617 m (2,024 ft)

Population (2025)
  - Total: 1,188
- Time zone: UTC+1 (CET)
  - Summer (DST): UTC+2 (CEST)
- Postal code: 321 4
- Area code: +421 44
- Vehicle registration plate (until 2022): LM
- Website: www.lubela.sk

Ľubeľa (Hungarian: Lubella) is a village and municipality in Liptovský Mikuláš District in the Žilina Region of northern Slovakia.

== History ==
In historical records the village was first mentioned in 1278. Before the establishment of independent Czechoslovakia in 1918, it was part of Liptó County within the Kingdom of Hungary. From 1939 to 1945, it was part of the Slovak Republic.

== Geography ==
The municipality lies at an altitude of 617 metres (2,024 ft) and covers an area of 17.45 km^{2} (6.74 sq mi) (2025).

== Population ==
Population statistic (10 years)
Year	1995	2005	2015	2025
Count	1155	1095	1117	1188
Difference		−5.19%	+2.00%	+6.35%

Population statistic
Year	2024	2025
Count	1192	1188
Difference		−0.33%

It has a population of 1188 people (31 December 2025).

=== Ethnicity ===
Census 2021 (1+ %)
Ethnicity	Number	Fraction
Slovak	1188	97.69%
Not found out	24	1.97%
Total	1216	

In year 2021 was 1216 people by ethnicity 1188 as Slovak, 24 as Not found out, 5 as Czech, 4 as Polish, 3 as Hungarian, 2 as Russian, 2 as Other, 1 as Ukrainian and 1 as Romani.

Note on population: The difference values of population numbers in the table "Population statistic" and in the sections "Ethnicity" & "Religion" is caused by the use of various statistical methods.

=== Religion ===
Census 2021 (1+ %)
Religion	Number	Fraction
Roman Catholic Church	777	63.9%
None	230	18.91%
Evangelical Church	161	13.24%
Not found out	22	1.81%
Total	1216	

In year 2021 was 1216 people by religion 777 from Roman Catholic Church, 230 from None, 161 from Evangelical Church, 22 from Not found out, 12 from Greek Catholic Church, 5 from Christian Congregations in Slovakia, 3 from Other, 2 from Calvinist Church, 2 from Ad hoc movements, 1 from Eastern Orthodox Church and 1 from Apostolic Church.

== See also ==
- Liubelia a Ukrainian village with phonetically the same name
