= Ministries of the Ukrainian Soviet Socialist Republic =

The ministries of the Ukrainian Soviet Socialist Republic were central bodies of state administration of the Ukrainian SSR (for brevity Ukraine) as republican ministries of the Soviet Union. Among other central bodies of state administration there also were committees, state committees, and other agencies. After World War II in 1946 ministries uniformly as throughout the rest of the Soviet Union replaced the existing People's Commissariats. The ministries were part of the Council of Ministries of the UkrSSR until 18 April 1991 when the latter was reformed into the Cabinet of Ministries of the UkrSSR.

== General overview ==
Ministries of the Ukrainian SSR governed their assigned sectors of economy, socially-cultural, and administratively-political administrations within the Ukrainian SSR. Ministries of the Ukrainian SSR were categorized in union-republican and republican, such division existed until May 13, 1991. Supposedly republican ministries were administered by the Council of Ministers of the Ukrainian SSR, while union-republican ministries had double subordination to the Council of Ministers of the Ukrainian SSR as well as to their respective union-republican ministries of the Soviet Union or in some instances - state committees of the Soviet Union.

The general principles of organization and functioning of ministries of the Ukrainian SSR are regulated by the Constitution of the Soviet Union, Constitution of the Ukrainian SSR, and other legal acts. More detailed regulations are established by the Law of the Ukrainian SSR about the Council of Ministers of the Ukrainian SSR of December 19, 1978. Additionally each ministry has its own statute that defines its tasks, powers, and legal status.

Ministries of the Ukrainian SSR are headed by their ministers. Ministries are responsible for status and development of their respective sector and execution of state plans as well as solution of other tasks that those sectors face.

In 1981 there were at least 28 union-republican ministries in Ukraine and only six republican ministries. After transformation of the Council of Ministers of the Ukrainian SSR into the Cabinet of Ministers of the Ukrainian SSR, number of ministers decreased substantially, while their categorization on union-republican and republican was eliminated after the adaptation of Declaration on State Sovereignty of Ukraine.

== List of Ministries ==
In bold are ministries that were kept or revived in post-Soviet Ukraine.

=== Union-republican ===
- **Ministry of Internal Affairs** (1917–present)
  - Ministry of State Security (1941, 1943–1953) merged with the Ministry of Interior Affairs
- Ministry of Civil Housing Construction (1943–1957)
- **Ministry of Foreign Affairs** (1917–1920, 1944–present)
- Ministry of Light Industry (1932–1934, 1936–1957, 1965–1991) → State Committee of Light Industry
  - Ministry of Textile Industry (1939–1949, 1955–1956) → Ministry of Light Industry
- **Ministry of Forestry** (1947–1953, 1966–1994)
- Ministry of Forest, [Wood, and Paper] Industry (1936–1957, 1965–1990) → "Ukrlisprom"
  - Ministry of Furniture and Carpentry (1946–1953) → Ministry of Forestry, and Paper
  - Ministry of Paper and Woodworking Industry (1955–1957)
- Ministry of Meat and Dairy Industry (1939–1957, 1965–1985) → State Committee of Agrarian-Industrial Complex
- **Ministry of Education** (People's Education) (1917–present) → with Ministry of Science
- **Ministry of Health Care** (1918–present)
- Ministry of Construction Materials Industry (1939–1958, 1965–1991) → "Ukrbudmaterialy"
- **Ministry of Trade** (1924–1930, 1934–1994, 1995–2000, 2010–present) → with Ministry of Foreign Economic Relations in 1992–1994 and 1995–2000, with Economical Development
  - People's Commissariat of Procurement (1930–1935)
- **Ministry of Finance** (1917–present)
- **Ministry of Food Industry** (1936–1957, 1965–1985, 1991–1997, 2010–2019) → with Ministry of Foreign Economic Relations in 1991–1997, 2010–2019
  - Ministry of Tasting Industry (1946–1949) → Ministry of Food Industry
- **Ministry of Justice** (1917–1963, 1970–present)
- **Ministry of Culture** (Cinematography) (1946–present) with Ministry of Arts (1995–2005), with Ministry of Tourism (2005–2010), with Ministry of Youth and Sports (2019–present)
- Ministry of Ferrous Metallurgy (1954–1957, 1965–1987) → State Planning Commission
- Ministry of Coal Industry (1954–1957, 1965–1987)
- **Ministry of Communication** (1955–1991, 1992–1997, 2004–2010) with Ministry of Transportation
- Ministry of Higher and Special General Education (1955–1959, 1960–1991) → State Committee on issues of Science and Technology
- **Ministry of Construction** [Industrial] (1956–1967, 1973–1991, 1992–1919) → with Ministry of Investments (1991–1992), with Ministry of Architecture (1992–1994), with Ministry of Architecture and Public Housing (2005–2007), with Ministry of Regional Development (2007–2019), with Ministry of Public Housing (2010–2019)
- Ministry of Construction of Heavy Industry Companies
- Ministry of Geology
- Ministry of Power Generation and Electrification
- Ministry of Amelioration and Water Management
- Ministry of Montage and Special Construction
- Ministry of Fruit and Vegetable Farming
- Ministry of Rural Construction

=== Republican ===
- **Ministry of [Automobile] Transportation** (1939–2010) merged with the Ministry of Communication in 2004
- **Ministry of Public Housing (Public Services)** (1931–1957, 1960–1990, 2005–2019)
- Ministry of Local Industry (1934–1957, 1965–1990)
  - Ministry of Local Fueling Industry (1939–1957) merged with the Ministry of Local Industry in 1953
- **Ministry of Social Security** (1918–1996, 1997–present) in 1997–2010 along with Ministry of Labor
- Ministry of Construction and Exploitation of Automobile Roads
- Ministry of Consumer Services of Population

=== Other ===
- **Ministry of Defense** (1917–1920, 1944-1978 under undefined status, 1991-present)
- Ministry of State Control (1918–1934, 1940–1957) → Commission of People's Control
  - People's Commissariat of Workers'-Peasants' Inspection merged with People's Commissariat of State Control
- **Ministry of Agriculture** (Land Cultivation) (1917–1985, 1991–present) → with Ministry of Food Industry 1991–1997, 2010–2019, with Ministry of Regional Development and Trade 2019–present
  - Ministry of Cotton Industry (1950–1953)
  - Ministry of Soviet [Crops and Livestock] Farms (1936–1946, 1947–1953, 1953–1957, 1969–1983)
    - Ministry of Industrial Crops (1946–1947)
    - Ministry of Livestock (1946–1947)
- Ministry of Fisheries (1939–1953, 1954–1957)
- Ministry of Construction of Coal Industry Enterprises (1956–1957)
- Ministry of Construction of Metallurgical and Chemical Industries Enterprises (1956–1957)
- Ministry of Bread Products (1956–1965, 1969–1991) → State Committee on Bread Products

== See also ==
- Council of Ministers of the Ukrainian SSR
