= Marina Gnatenko =

Ukrainian agronomist and politician (1914–2006)

Marina Vasilyevna Gnatenko (Russian: Марина Васильевна Гнатенко, Ukrainian: Марина Василівна Гнатенко; 12 March 1914, Storosillia, Ukraine — 13 April 2006, Kyiv, Ukraine) was a sugarbeet farmer, Stakhanovite, Hero of Socialist Labor, and politician. She held posts in the Congresses of Communist Party of Ukraine, the Supreme Soviet of the Ukrainian SSR (1938 to 1947), and the Supreme Soviet of the USSR (1946 to 1950).

She died on April 13, 2006. She was buried in Kyiv at the Berkovets cemetery.
