= Leonid Safronov =

Russian politician (1938–2025)

- Леонид Сафронов

Member of the Congress of People's Deputies of Russia
- In office 16 May 1990 – 21 September 1993

Personal details
- Born: Leonid Pavlovich Safronov; 14 May 1938; Nizhnie Sergi, Sverdlovsk Oblast, Russian SFSR, USSR
- Died: 1 January 2025 (aged 86); Chishminsky District, Russia
- Political party: CPSU
- Education: Kuibyshev Industrial Institute
- Occupation: Engineer

Leonid Pavlovich Safronov (Russian: Леонид Павлович Сафронов; 14 May 1938 – 1 January 2025) was a Russian politician. A member of the Communist Party of the Soviet Union, he served in the Congress of People's Deputies of Russia from 1990 to 1993.

Safronov died in Chishminsky District on 1 January 2025, at the age of 86.
