= Piatykhatky =

Piatykhatky (Ukrainian: П'ятихатки) can refer to one of several inhabited localities in Ukraine:

- Piatykhatky, a city in Dnipropetrovsk Oblast
- Piatykhatky, a historic neighborhood in Kharkiv
- Piatykhatky, a village in Zaporizhzhia Oblast
