= Vladimir Filatov =

Russian ophthalmologist

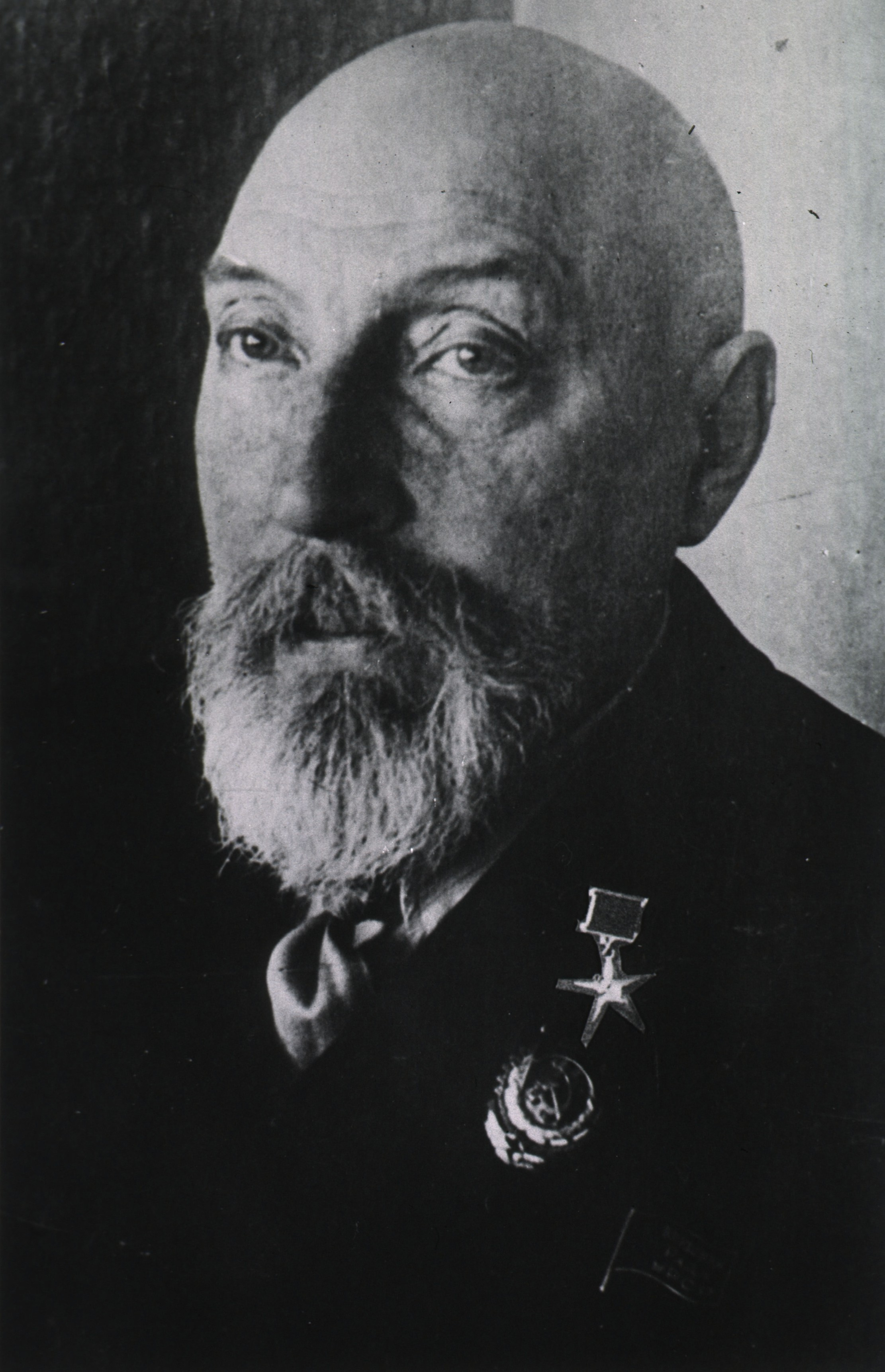
- Born: 15 February 1875; Mikhailovka, Russian Empire (now Mordovia, Russia)
- Died: 30 October 1956 (aged 81); Odesa, Ukrainian SSR, Soviet Union
- Citizenship: Russian Empire; Soviet Union
- Education: Imperial Moscow University (1897)
- Scientific career
- Fields: Medicine

Signature
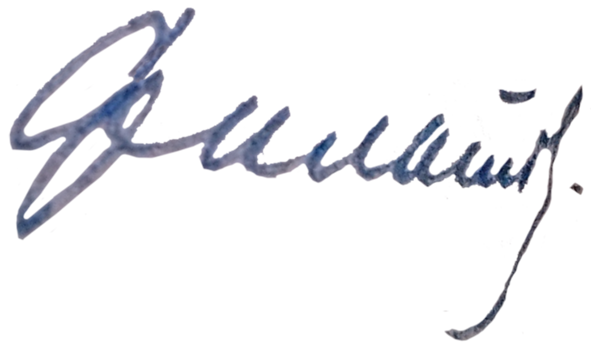

Vladimir Petrovich Filatov (Russian: Владимир Петрович Филaтoв, 27 February [O.S. 15 February] 1875 – 30 October 1956) was a Russian Empire and Soviet ophthalmologist and surgeon best known for his development of tissue therapy. He introduced the tube flap grafting method, corneal transplantation and preservation of grafts from cadaver eyes. He founded the Institute of Eye Diseases & Tissue Therapy in Odessa, Soviet Union (today Ukraine). Filatov is also credited for restoring Vasily Zaytsev's sight when he suffered an injury to his eyes from a mortar attack during Battle of Stalingrad.

The first corneal transplantation was attempted by Filatov on 28 February 1912, but the graft grew opaque. After numerous attempts over the course of many years, Filatov achieved a successful transplantation of cornea from a diseased person on 6 May 1931.

Throughout his life, Filatov made no secret of the fact that he was a devout Orthodox Christian. The Communist Party honoured him for his medical work, but pretended not to notice his faith.

A large group of official representatives from the Kremlin came for his funeral, which was to be a majestic affair, ending with the bier being burned. His widow asked that his will be read out in front of everyone. He asked for an Orthodox funeral conducted by a bishop, and he wanted to be buried, with the tomb stone proclaiming "I look for the resurrection of the dead." The Kremlin gave permission for his wishes to be fulfilled.

After Filatov's death in 1956, his apprentice Nadezhda Puchkovskaya led the Institute of Eye Diseases & Tissue Therapy in Odessa, which was renamed in honour of Filatov as The Filatov Institute of Eye Diseases & Tissue Therapy.

== Tissue therapy ==
Tissue therapy is a method initially proposed by Filatov, that is based on a hypothesis of existing of biogenic stimulators (substances appearing in tissues exposed to unfavorable conditions) that stimulate inner powers of a treated organism. Filatov treated corneal opacity by human cornea transplantation. At the first, transplantation material was taken from humans who were having an eye surgically removed. Due to a shortage of supply, Filatov tried to use corneas from recently dead people. That did not lead to satisfying results. During experimental work he discovered that corpses' corneas, saved at 3-4 °C for several days, rather than used immediately, gave more positive results. Thus he succeeded in growing his practice in cornea transplantation.

As it seemed to Filatov in the time of engaging in that practice, the method also cured a number of diseases not connected to corneal opacity. He suggested that a piece of tissue placed in unfavorable conditions (cold and darkness) which still do not kill it, changes its metabolism for producing some yet unknown compounds, that serve saving it alive as long as possible. He named them biogenic stimulators.

Then he applied the same method to treating skin diseases, and (by 1933) he formulated main postulates of his doctrine of biogenic stimulators and tissue therapy.

After Filatov, the biogenic stimulators teaching mostly developed into obtaining of biogenic extracts from different materials of animal and plant origin, including (but not limited to) placenta, vitreous body, aloe leaves, peloid from limans of the Black Sea and even peat. All biogenic extracts have common preparation technique: original material is exposed to specific cold temperatures for specific durations, then extraction is performed, the obtained extracts are packed in ampules and sterilized. These extracts are used subcutaneously as pharmaceutical and veterinary remedies in post-Soviet countries against inflammation, degeneration, atrophy, and other slow pathological processes.

In America, the method was criticized and did not find much support and application.

== See also ==
- Ramón Castroviejo – a Spanish contemporary of Filatov that was also a pioneer in corneal transplantation
- David Bushmich – an ophthalmologist under Filatov, worked closely with Dr. Puchkovskaya
- Ashalchi Oki - an ophthalmologist trained by Filatov
