= Ulianivka, Sumy Raion, Sumy Oblast =

Rural locality in Sumy Oblast, Ukraine

Ulianivka Улянівка
- Rural settlement
- Location in Sumy Oblast Location in Ukraine
- Country: Ukraine
- Oblast: Sumy Oblast
- Raion: Sumy Raion
- Hromada: Mykolaivka settlement hromada

Population (2022)
  - Total: 2,202
- Time zone: UTC+2 (EET)
  - Summer (DST): UTC+3 (EEST)

Ulianivka (Ukrainian: Улянівка; Russian: Ульяновка) is a rural settlement in Sumy Raion, Sumy Oblast, Ukraine. It is located on the banks of the Vyr, a left tributary of the Seym in the drainage basin of the Dnieper. Ulianivka belongs to Mykolaivka settlement hromada, one of the hromadas of Ukraine. Population: 2,202 (2022 estimate).

== History ==
Until 18 July 2020, Ulianivka belonged to Bilopillia Raion. The raion was abolished in July 2020 as part of the administrative reform of Ukraine, which reduced the number of raions of Sumy Oblast to five. The area of Bilopillia Raion was merged into Sumy Raion.

Until 26 January 2024, Ulianivka was designated urban-type settlement. On this day, a new law entered into force which abolished this status, and Ulianivka became a rural settlement.

== Geography ==
The village is located 24 km south of the district center and 8 km from the Vyry railway station. Height above sea level: 168 m. Near the village are the villages of Tuchne, Novoandreyevka and Timiryazevka.

Ulianivka is located on the slopes of the Central Russian Upland. The village is located in the valley of the VyrRiver, a tributary of the Seim River (Dnieper basin).

The climate is moderately continental. Winter is cool, summer is not hot. The average temperature in July is +19 °C, in January -7.5 °C. The maximum precipitation falls in the summer in the form of rain. The average annual amount is from 650 to 700 mm, changing from west to east.

The village located in the forest steppe natural zone. Among the trees in the forests, oaks, lindens, and maples dominate. Typical large mammals are elk, roe deer, wild boar, squirrels, beavers, hares and wolves. The most common soils in the area are typical black earths, gray, meadow, and meadow-bog soils.

== Economy ==
=== Transportation ===
The closest railway station is Vyry, about 10 kilometres (6.2 mi) northeast of the settlement. It is on the railway connecting Sumy and Vorozhba. There is infrequent passenger traffic. Ulianivka is connected by road with Sumy, Vorozhba, and Konotop.
