= Ivanopil, Korosten Raion, Zhytomyr Oblast =

Village in Zhytomyr Oblast, Ukraine

Ivanopil Іванопіль
- Village
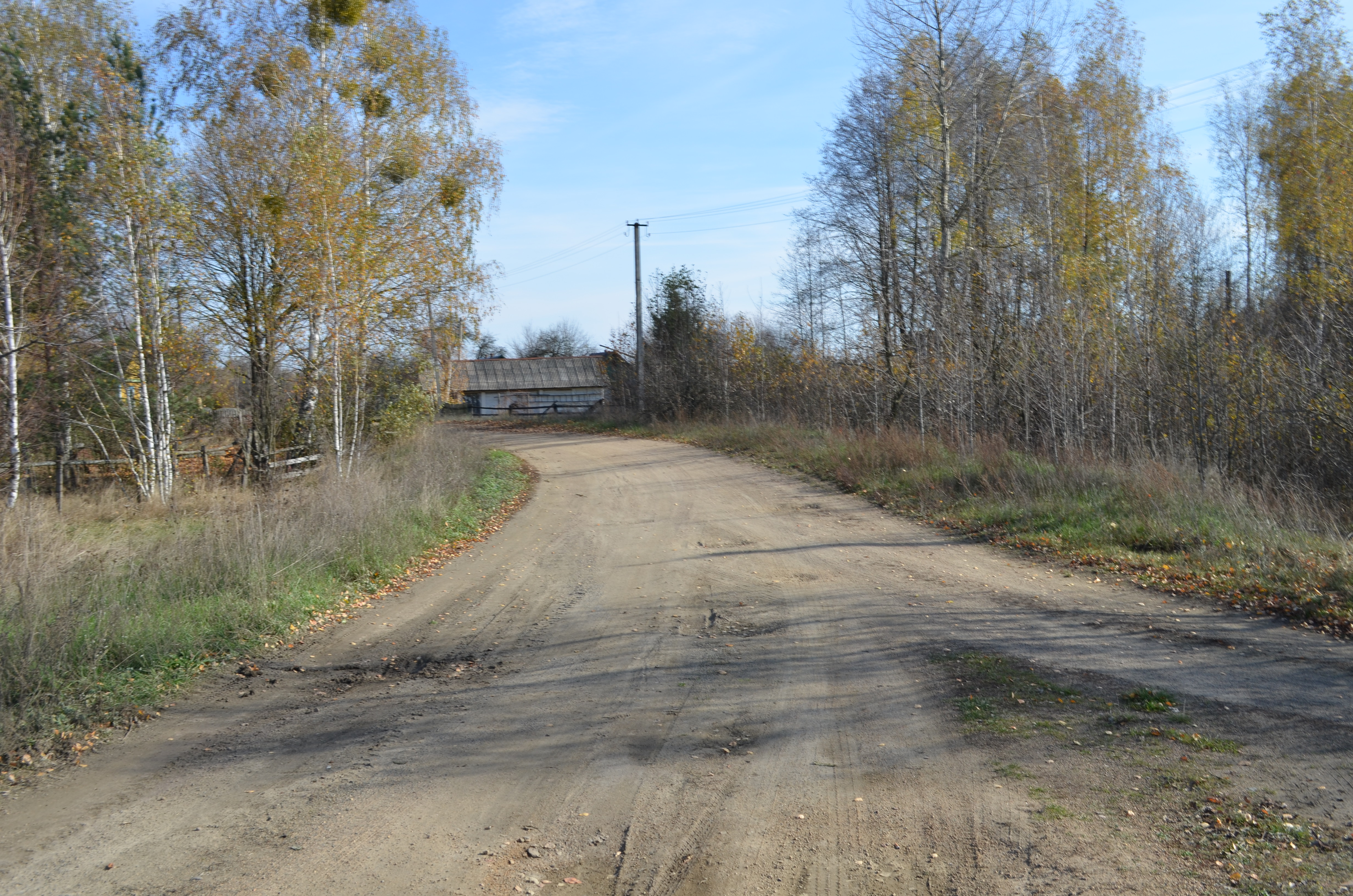

- Location within Zhytomyr Oblast Location within Ukraine
- Coordinates: 50°54′56″N 28°12′34″E
- Country: Ukraine
- Oblast: Zhytomyr Oblast
- Raion: Korosten Raion
- Hromada: Ushomyr rural hromada
- Elevation: 200 m (660 ft)

Population (2001)
  - Total: 2,027
- Time zone: UTC+2 (EET)
  - Summer (DST): UTC+3 (EEST)
- Postal code: 11562
- Area code: +380 4142

Ivanopil (Ukrainian: Іванопіль) is a village in Korosten Raion, Zhytomyr Oblast, Ukraine. It forms part of Usohmyr rural hromada, one of the hromadas of Ukraine.

== History ==
Ivanopil was formerly named is Yanushpil. It was founded before 1867. In 1906, Ivanopil was located in Ushomyr Volost, Zhitomirsky Uyezd, Volhynian Governorate. The distance from the county town is 85 versts, from the parish 27. There were 52 yards, 308 inhabitants. In 1923, it was part of the Bondariv village council. Until July 28, 2016, Ivanopil was part of the Bondariv village council of the Korosten Raion of Zhytomyr Oblast.
