= Olesk =

Family name

Olesk is an Estonian surname. Notable people with the surname include:

- Gert Olesk (born 1973), football player
- Lui Olesk (1876–1932), politician and lawyer
- Olev Olesk (1921–2017), exile politician
- Peeter Olesk (politician) (1953–2021), Estonian literary scholar and politician
- Peeter Olesk (sport shooter) (born 1993), Estonian sport shooter
- Sirje Olesk (born 1954), literary scholar and critic
