= Liubelia =

Rural locality in Lviv Oblast, Ukraine

Coordinates: 50°11′42″N 23°56′43″E

Liubelia or Lyubelya (Ukrainian: Любеля; Polish: Lubela, Lubelła) is a village in Lviv Raion, Lviv Oblast, western Ukraine. It belongs to Zhovkva urban hromada, one of the hromadas of Ukraine.

Before World War I it belonged to Galicia (Austrian Poland) of Austria-Hungary. Until the Soviet invasion of Poland the village belonged to the Second Polish Republic. Until 1934 it constituted a separate gmina, after that it was included into an aggregate gmina Butyny ( Żółkiew powiat, Lwów Voivodeship) with administrative centre in the village Butyny.

Until 18 July 2020, Liubelia belonged to Zhovkva Raion. The raion was abolished in July 2020 as part of the administrative reform of Ukraine, which reduced the number of raions of Lviv Oblast to seven. The area of Zhovkva Raion was merged into Lviv Raion.

== See also ==
- Ľubeľa a Slovak village with phonetically same name
