= Filatov Institute of Eye Diseases and Tissue Therapy =

Ophthalmology institute in Odesa, Ukraine

Coordinates: 46.45427°N 30.76177°E

The Filatov Institute of Eye Diseases and Tissue Therapy of the National Academy of Medical Sciences of Ukraine
- Державна установа Інститут очних хвороб і тканинної терапії ім. В.П.Філатова Національної академії медичних наук України.
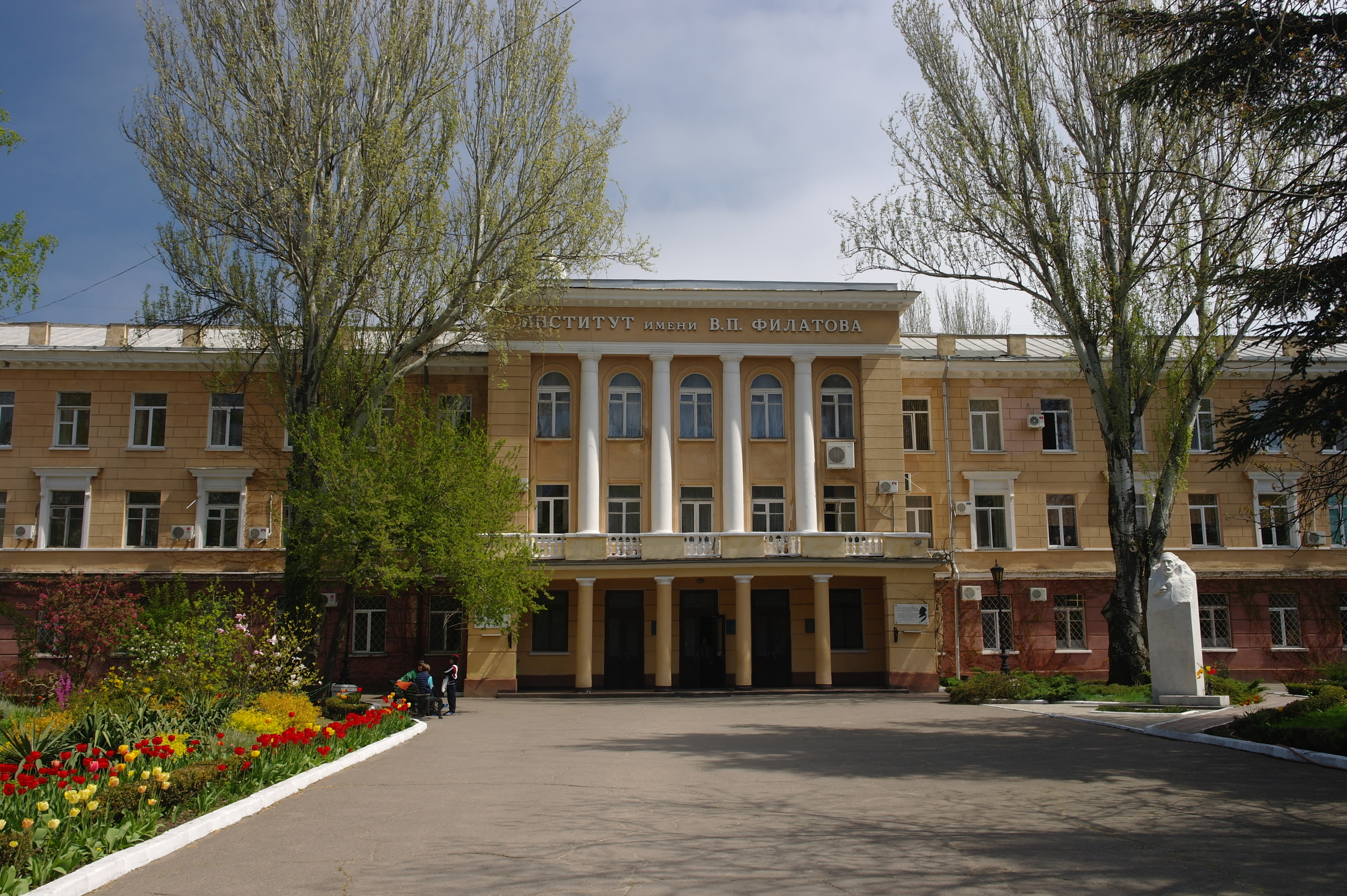
- Motto: Quilibet debet, solem videre!
- Motto in English: Everyone should see the sun!
- Established: 1936
- Rector: Natalia Volodymyrivna Pasechnikova
- Students: 27 doctoral, 31 others.
- Location: Odesa, Ukraine
- Website: The Filatov Institute.

Immovable Monument of Local Significance of Ukraine
- Official name: Будівля інституту очних хвороб (арх. М.Кац Л.Кордонський М.Шліфер), де працювали академіки АМН СРСР, Герої Соц.Праці В.П.Філатов та Н.О.Пучковська (Building of the Institute of Eye Diseases (arch. M. Kats, L. Kordonsky, M. Shifler), where academics of AMN USSR, Heroes of Soc. Labour V. P. Filatov and N. O. Puchkovska worked)
- Type: Architecture, Urban Planning, History
- Reference no.: 64-Од

The Filatov Institute is a research institute and a large ophthalmology (eye) hospital in Odesa, Ukraine. It was founded by Vladimir Filatov, an academic ophthalmologist. Its mission is the study of eye diseases and injuries, the training of ophthalmologists and the provision of eye care in Ukraine. The institute has 700 staff including 27 professors.

== History ==
The Institute of Experimental Ophthalmology, was founded in April 1936 under a resolution of the People's Commissars Council of the USSR (order 632). It had a staff of 20. Its building on Proletarian boulevard (now French boulevard) was completed in 1939. In 1942, the institute was renamed the Ukrainian Experimental Institute of Eye Diseases. In 1945, the institute was renamed for its founder, Vladimir Filatov. On 17 January 1956, the USSR Ministry of Health renamed the institute The V. Filatov Ukrainian Research and Development Institute of Eye Diseases and Tissue Therapy of the National Academy of Medical Sciences of Ukraine. and on 18 January 1965, the Odesa Research Institute of Eye Diseases and Tissue Therapy. On 10 April 1986, the presidium of the supreme council of the USSR awarded the institute the Order of the Red Banner and on 22 January 1992, it became the V. Filatov Ukrainian Research Institute of Eye Diseases and Tissue Therapy. On 22 March 1993, the institute became a part of the Ukraine Academy of Medical Sciences and on 29 September 1993, was awarded the Order of the Academy of Medical Sciences. On 28 February 2012, the academy named the institute, The Filatov Institute of Eye Diseases and Tissue Therapy of National Academy of Medical Sciences of Ukraine.

== Clinical services ==
Patients from Ukraine and beyond are seen in a general ophthalmology outpatient clinic, where about 700 patients are seen per day. The institute is a national tertiary referral centre with specialist clinics for: uveitis, eye burns, ophthalmic oncology, pediatric ophthalmology, and eye trauma. Ophthalmic surgery is performed.

== Education ==
The institute is affiliated with the ophthalmology department of the Odesa National Medical University. Ukrainian and international post graduate trainees from intern level are taught in the fields of scientific and practical ophthalmology. The institute is accredited by the Specialised Academic Council to offer doctorate and master's degrees. The institute has been the publisher of Journal of Ophthalmology, the paper of the Ukrainian Ophthalmological Society since 1946.

The Filatov Institute contributes to a number of conferences. Every fourth May, the Filatov Institute hosts the Ukraine Institute of Ophthalmology Congress. The 2010 congress was the twelfth. Read at Filatov is an annual scientific and practical conference hosted by the institute. The institute also organises an annual inter-regional Ukrainian scientific and practical conference: the 2011 conference was in Luhansk and the 2012 conference in Uzhhorod.

== Science ==
The institute has a scientific panel and collects and analyzes statistical information about ocular morbidity and treatment in Ukraine.

== Departments ==
- Ophthalmo-endocrinology and glaucoma.
- Corneal pathology.
- Inflammatory eye diseases.
- Vitreo-retinal and laser surgery.
- Lens pathology.
- Eye trauma.
- Eye burns.
- Pediatric ophthalmic pathology.
- Ophthalmic oncology.
- Laser microsurgery.

== Laboratories ==
- Clinical diagnostics.
- Radiology.
- Electron microscopy.
- Histopathology and tissue preservation.
- Pharmacology and tissue therapy.
- Immunology.
- Biochemistry.
- Binocular vision disorders.
- Functional studies.
- Medical and technical development.
- Microbiology.
- Medical photography.

== Buildings ==
Initially, the institute was located at the second clinic hospital in Odesa. Its campus is now a large area and consists of many buildings. The main building was completed in 1939 when the institute moved to Frantsuzkyi (Proletarian) boulevard. It is a three-story L-shaped building housing clinics, departments, administrative offices and faculty. The laboratory building was constructed in 1976. A two-story extension was added in 1984 to house the archive, statistical office, the journal, the library and museum. In the laboratory building there is also a 700-seat conference hall. The library was founded in 1946, beginning with books donated by Filatov. It now holds more than 78, 300 works. The museum maintains an exhibit of Filatov's office and preserves his house at 53 Frantsuzkyi Boulevard. Social evenings to the memory of Filatov, celebrations and meetings are held at the museum. The polyclinic was built in 1952 and in 1961, a three-story surgical building was finished. The five story student hostel was built in 1973. There is also a vivarium.

== Directors ==
- Vladimir Filatov (1936–1956)
- Nadiia Puchkivska (1956–1985)
- Ivan Lohai (1985–2003)
- Nataliia Pasiechnikova (2004–present)

== See also ==
- Soft tissue therapy
