= Ivanopil, Berdychiv Raion, Zhytomyr Oblast =

Rural locality in Zhytomyr Oblast, Ukraine

Coordinates: 49°51′38″N 28°12′56″E

Ivanopil Іванопіль
- Rural settlement
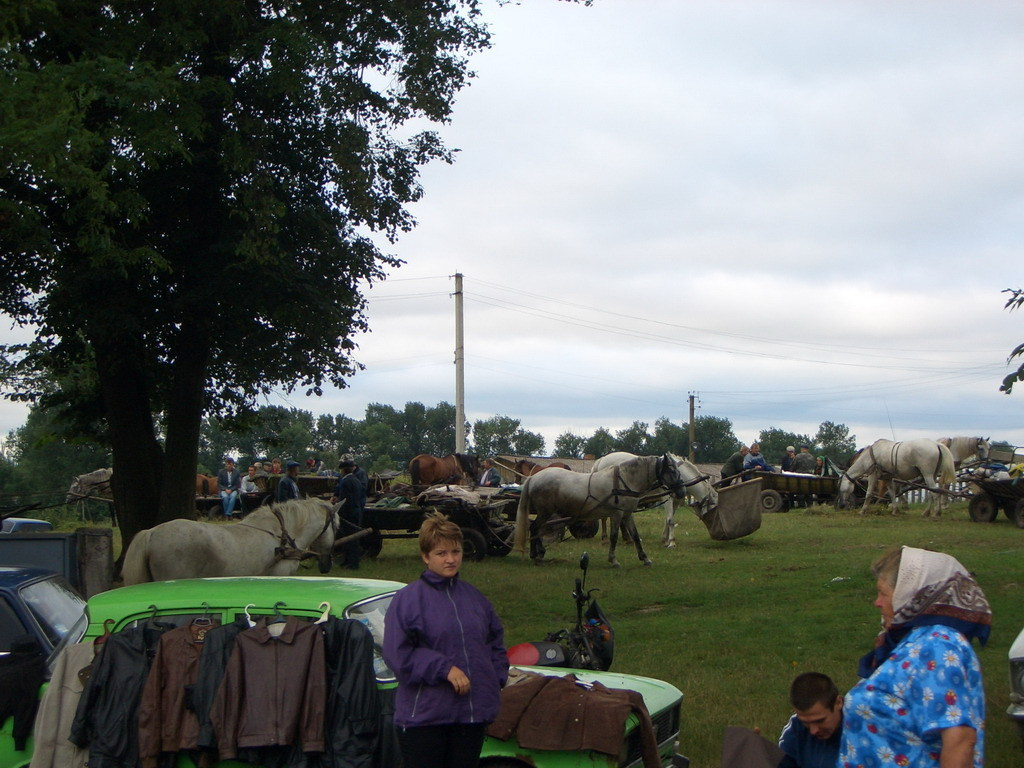
- Ivanopil market, 2006

- Location within Zhytomyr Oblast Location within Ukraine
- Country: Ukraine
- Oblast: Zhytomyr Oblast
- Raion: Berdychiv Raion

Population
  - Total: 2,937
- Time zone: UTC+2 (EET)
  - Summer (DST): UTC+3 (EEST)

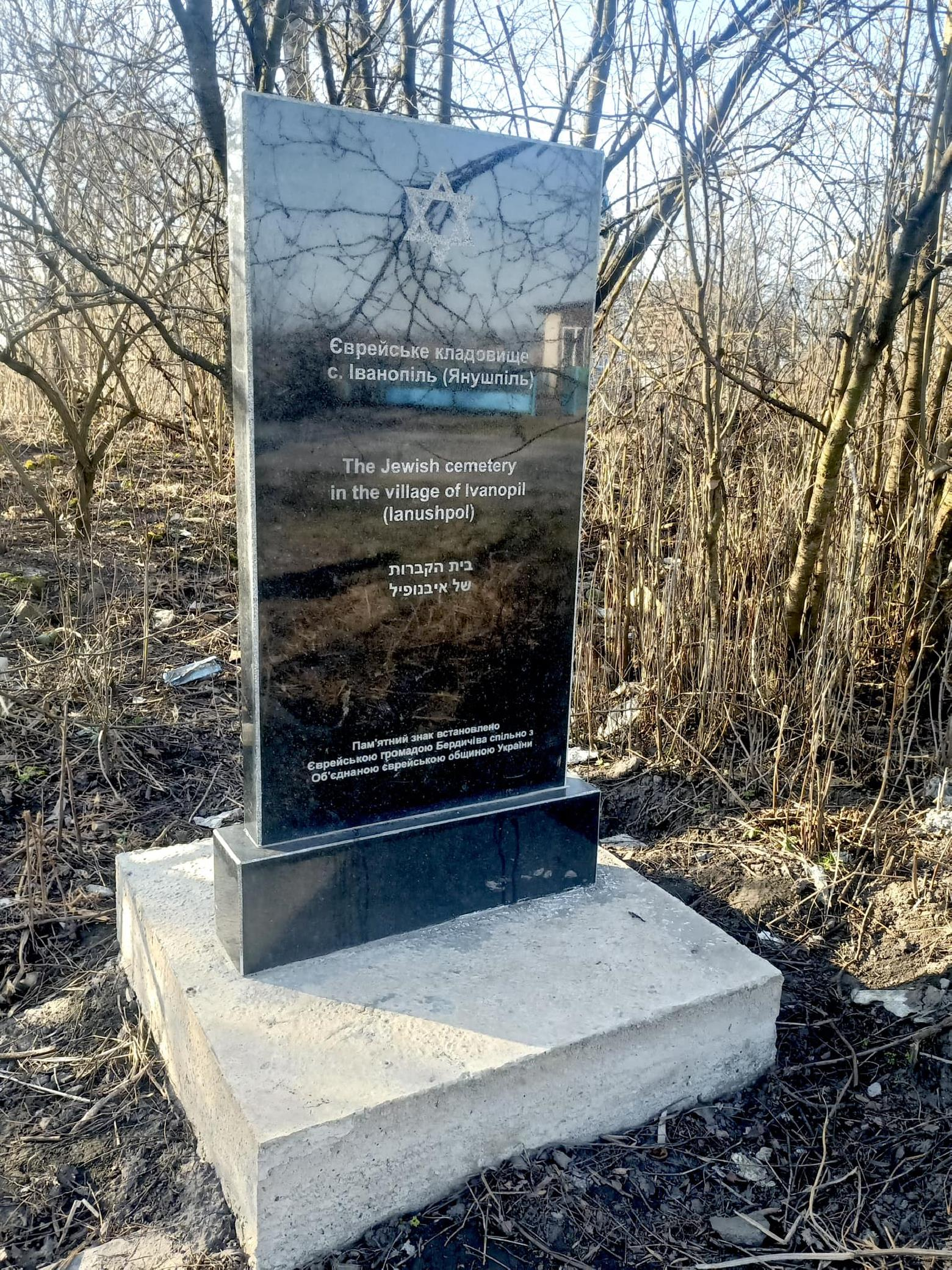
Ivanopil Jewish cemetery

Ivanopil (Ukrainian: Іванопіль, translit. Ivanopil’—known as Ukrainian: Янушпіль or Yanushpol or Ianushpol before 1946) is a rural settlement in Berdychiv Raion, Zhytomyr Oblast, Ukraine. Population: 2,937 (2022 estimate) In 2001, population was 3,993.

== History ==
=== Holocaust ===
In May 1942, German units murdered more than 800 Jewish children, women, and men from Yanushpil (from 1946 — Ivanopil) and neighbouring localities in the outskirts of the village. Jewish life in Yanushpil was eradicated.

Soviet prisoners of war as well as suspected and actual political opponents of National Socialism were also murdered in Yanushpil. The information stela was unveiled by the “Protecting Memory” in 2019 and it is dedicated to the victims of the German occupation in Yanushpil.

=== After 1945 ===
Until 26 January 2024, Ivanopil was designated urban-type settlement. On this day, a new law entered into force which abolished this status, and Ivanopil became a rural settlement.

== Economy ==
Ivanopil is a centre of sugar industry.
