= Ministry of Radhosps (Ukraine) =

Ukrainian Ministry of State Owned Farms later merged in Ministry Of Agriculture

Ministry of Radhosps of the Ukrainian SSR was a government ministry in charge of sovkhozes (state farms) in Ukraine that existed in 1947 to 1957. In 1957 merged with the existing Ministry of Agriculture.

== List of ministers ==
- Nikifor Kalchenko 1947-1950
- Poplyovkin ~1970
