= Central Committee of the 14th Congress of the All-Union Communist Party (Bolsheviks) =

Central governing body of the Soviet Communist Party.

Central Committee of the 14th Congress

31 December 1925 – 19 December 1927

Leadership
- General Secretary: Joseph Stalin
- Second Secretary: Vyacheslav Molotov
- Inner-groups: Politburo: 10 full & 11 candidates Secretariat: 6 full & 3 candidates Orgburo: 15 full & 5 candidates

Candidates

Apparatus
- No. of departments: 11

The Central Committee (CC) composition was elected by the 14th Congress, and sat from 31 December 1925 until 19 December 1927. The CC 1st Plenary Session renewed the composition of the Politburo, Secretariat and the Organizational Bureau (OB) of the All-Union Communist Party (Bolsheviks).

== Plenums ==
The CC was not a permanent institution. It convened plenary sessions, one emergency session, four CC plenary sessions and six joint CC–Central Control Commission (CCC) plenary sessions were held between the 14th Congress and the 15th Congress. When the CC was not in session, decision-making powers were transferred to inner bodies of the CC itself; the Politburo, Secretariat and Orgburo (none of these bodies were permanent either, but convened several times a months).

Plenary sessions of the Central Committee
Plenum	Date	Length
Emergency Plenary Session	28 December 1925	1 day
1st Plenary Session	1 January 1926	1 day
2nd Plenary Session	6–9 April 1926	4 days
1st Joint Plenary Session	14–23 July 1926	11 days
2nd Joint Plenary Session	23, 26 October 1926	2 days
3rd Joint Plenary Session	3 November 1926	1 day
3rd Plenary Session	7–12 February 1927	6 days
4th Plenary Session	13–16 April 1927	4 days
4th Joint Plenary Session	29 June – 9 August 1927	12 days
5th Joint Plenary Session	21–23 October 1927	3 days
6th Joint Plenary Session	12–14 November 1927	3 days

== Apparatus ==
Individuals employed by Central Committee's bureaus, departments and newspapers made up the apparatus between the 14th Congress and the 15th Congress. The bureaus and departments were supervised by the Secretariat, and each secretary (member of the Secretariat) supervised a specific department. The leaders of departments were officially referred to as Heads, while the titles of bureau leaders varied between chairman, first secretary and secretary.

Central Committee Apparatus of the 14th Congress of the All-Union Communist Party (Bolsheviks)
Institution	Leader	Cyrillic	Took office	Left office	Length of tenure	Nationality	Gender
Administrator of Affairs	Yakov Brezanovsky	Яков Брезановский	31 December 1925	19 December 1927	1 year and 353 days	Jewish	Male
Administrator of Affairs	Pyotr Guzakov	Пётр Гузаков	31 December 1925	19 December 1927	1 year and 353 days	Russian	Male
Agitation and Propaganda Department	Sergei Syrtsov	Сергей Сырцов	31 December 1925	27 January 1926	27 days	Russian	Male
Agitation and Propaganda Department	Vilhelm Knorin	Вильгельм Кнорин	27 January 1926	May 1927	1 year and 124 days	Latvian	Male
Agitation and Propaganda Department	Alexander Krinitsky	Александр Криницкий	May 1927	19 December 1927	202 days	Russian	Male
Bolshevik	Nikolai Bukharin	Никола́й Буха́рин	31 December 1925	19 December 1927	1 year and 353 days	Russian	Male
Bureau of the Secretariat	Lev Mekhlis	Лев Мехлис	31 December 1925	22 January 1926	22 days	Jewish	Male
Bureau of the Secretariat	Ivan Tovstukha	Иван Товстуха	22 January 1926	19 March 1926	56 days	Ukrainian	Male
Central Asian Bureau	Isaak Zelensky	Исаак Зеленский	31 December 1925	19 December 1927	1 year and 353 days	Jewish	Male
Department for Work Among Women (until July 1926) Department for Worker Women and Peasant Women (from July 1926)	Klavdiya Nikolayeva	Клавдия Николаева	31 December 1925	27 January 1926	27 days	Russian	Female
Department for Work Among Women (until July 1926) Department for Worker Women and Peasant Women (from July 1926)	Aleksandra Artyukhina	Александра Артюхина	27 January 1926	19 December 1927	1 year and 326 days	Russian	Female
Department of Party History	Semyon Kanatchikov	Семён Канатчиков	31 December 1925	September 1926	273 days	Russian	Male
Finance Department	P. N. Ivanov	П. Н. Иванов	31 December 1925	19 December 1927	1 year and 353 days	Russian	Male
Information Department	Lev Roshal	Лев Рошаль	31 December 1925	19 December 1927	1 year and 353 days	Jewish	Male
Lenin Institute	Lev Kamenev	Лев Ка́менев	31 December 1925	1926	31 days	Jewish-Russian (Note: His father was Jewish and his mother Russian)	Male
Lenin Institute	Ivan Skvortsov-Stepanov	Ива́н Скворцо́в-Степа́нов	1926	19 December 1927	1 year and 322 days	Russian	Male
North–West Bureau	Nikolay Komarov	Николай Колотилов	31 December 1925	19 December 1927	1 year and 353 days	Russian	Male
Organizational and Distribution Department	Konstantin Gey	Константин Гей	31 December 1925	25 March 1926	84 days	Russian	Male
Organizational and Distribution Department	Ivan Moskvin	Иван Москвин	25 March 1926	19 December 1927	1 year and 269 days	Russian	Male
Press Department	Juozas Vareikis	Иосиф Варейкис	31 December 1925	January 1926	28 days	Lithuanian	Male
Press Department	Vladimir Vasilievsky	Владимир Васильевский	28 January 1926	4 March 1926	34 days	Russian	Male
Press Department	Sergei Gusev	Сергей Гусев	March 1926	19 December 1927	1 year and 293 days	Jewish	Male
Pravda	Nikolai Bukharin	Никола́й Буха́рин	31 December 1925	19 December 1927	1 year and 353 days	Russian	Male
Secret Department	Ivan Tovstukha	Иван Товстуха	19 March 1926	19 December 1927	1 year and 275 days	Ukrainian	Male
Statistical Department	Yelena Smitten	Елена Смиттен	31 December 1925	19 December 1927	1 year and 353 days	Belarusian	Female

== Composition ==
=== Members ===
Members of the Central Committee of the 14th Congress of the All-Union Communist Party (Bolsheviks)
Name	Cyrillic	13th CC	15th CC	Birth	Death	PM	Nationality	Gender	Portrait
Andrey Andreyev	Андрей Андреев	Old	Reelected	1895	1971	1914	Russian	Male	
Nikolay Antipov	Николай Антипов	Old	Reelected	1894	1938	1912	Russian	Male	
Aleksandra Artyukhina	Александра Артюхина	Candidate	Reelected	1889	1969	1910	Russian	Female	
Aleksei Badayev	Алексей Бадаев	Candidate	Reelected	1883	1951	1904	Russian	Male	
Karl Bauman	Карл Бауман	Old	Reelected	1892	1937	1907	Latvian	Male	—
Andrei Bubnov	Андрей Бубнов	Old	Reelected	1884	1938	1903	Russian	Male	
Nikolai Bukharin	Никола́й Буха́рин	Old	Reelected	1888	1938	1906	Russian	Male	
Georgy Chicherin	Георгий Чичерин	New	Reelected	1872	1936	1918	Russian	Male	
Vlas Chubar	Влас Чубар	Old	Reelected	1891	1939	1907	Ukrainian	Male	
Mikhail Chudov	Михаил Чудов	Candidate	Reelected	1893	1937	1913	Russian	Male	—
Alexander Dogadov	Александр Догадов	Old	Reelected	1888	1937	1905	Russian	Male	—
Felix Dzerzhinsky	Фе́ликс Дзержи́нский	Old	Died	1877	1926	1906	Polish	Male	
Ivan Kabakov	Иван Кабаков	Candidate	Reelected	1891	1937	1914	Russian	Male	—
Lazar Kaganovich	Лазарь Каганович	Old	Reelected	1893	1991	1911	Jewish	Male	
Mikhail Kalinin	Михаил Калинин	Old	Reelected	1875	1946	1898	Russian	Male	
Lev Kamenev	Лев Ка́менев	Old	Not	1883	1936	1901	Jewish-Russian (Note: His father was Jewish and his mother Russian)	Male	
Kuprian Kirkizh	Куприян Киркиж	Candidate	Reelected	1886	1932	1910	Belarusian	Male	
Sergey Kirov	Серге́й Ки́ров	Old	Reelected	1886	1934	1904	Russian	Male	
Nikolay Kolotilov	Николай Колотилов	Old	Reelected	1885	1937	1903	Russian	Male	—
Nikolay Komarov	Николай Колотилов	Old	Reelected	1886	1937	1909	Russian	Male	
Stanislav Kosior	Станислав Косиор	Old	Reelected	1889	1939	1907	Polish	Male	
Vasily Kotov	Василий Котов	New	Reelected	1885	1937	1915	Russian	Male	—
Leonid Krasin	Леонид Красин	Old	Died	1870	1926	1898	Russian	Male	
Gleb Krzhizhanovsky	Глеб Кржижано́вский	Old	Reelected	1872	1959	1898	Polish-German (Note: His father was Polish and his mother German)	Male	
Nikolay Kubyak	Николай Кубяк	Old	Reelected	1881	1937	1898	Russian	Male	
Yegor Kulikov	Егор Куликов	New	Reelected	1891	1943	1910	Russian	Male	—
Emanuel Kviring	Эммануил Квиринг	Old	Reelected	1888	1937	1912	Volga German	Male	
Ivan Lepse	Иван Лепсе	Old	Reelected	1889	1929	1906	Latvian	Male	—
Semen Lobov	Семён Лобов	Old	Reelected	1888	1937	1913	Russian	Male	—
Dmitry Manuilsky	Дмитро Мануїльський	Old	Reelected	1883	1959	1903	Ukrainian	Male	
Alexei Medvedev	Алексей Медведев	Old	Reelected	1884	1937	1904	Russian	Male	
Vasily Mikhailov	Василий Михайлов	Old	Reelected	1894	1937	1915	Russian	Male	
Anastas Mikoyan	Анастас Микоян	Old	Reelected	1895	1978	1915	Armenian	Male	
Vyacheslav Molotov	Вячеслав Молотов	Old	Reelected	1890	1986	1906	Russian	Male	
Mamia Orakhelashvili	Мамия Орахелашвили	Promoted	Reelected	1888	1937	1903	Georgian	Male	
Grigol Ordzhonikidze	Григо́рий Орджоники́дзе	Old	Not	1886	1937	1903	Georgian	Male	
Grigory Petrovsky	Григо́рій Петро́вський	Old	Reelected	1878	1958	1898	Ukrainian	Male	a bearded man with wavy hair, wearing glasses and what seems to be a suit, a white tie, and a black and white dotted shirt
Georgy Pyatakov	Юрій П'ятаков	Old	Not	1890	1937	1910	Russian	Male	
Andrey Radchenko	Андрей Радченко	New	Not	1887	1938	1912	Ukrainian	Male	—
Christian Rakovsky	Христиан Раковский	Old	Not	1873	1941	1917	Bulgarian	Male	
Jānis Rudzutaks	Ян Рудзутак	Old	Reelected	1887	1938	1906	Latvian	Male	
Moisei Rukhimovich	Моисей Рухимович	Old	Reelected	1889	1937	1913	Jewish	Male	
Ivan Rumyantsev	Иван Румянцев	Old	Reelected	1886	1937	1905	Russian	Male	
Alexei Rykov	Алексей Рыков	Old	Reelected	1881	1938	1899	Russian	Male	
Vasily Schmidt	Сергей Чуцкаев	Candidate	Reelected	1886	1938	1905	German	Male	
Isaak Schwartz	Исаак Шварц	Old	Reelected	1879	1951	1899	Jewish	Male	
Nikolai Shvernik	Николай Шверник	New	Reelected	1888	1970	1905	Russian	Male	
Ivan Skvortsov-Stepanov	Ива́н Скворцо́в-Степа́нов	New	Reelected	1878	1928	1898	Russian	Male	
Ivar Smilga	Ивар Смилга	Candidate	Not	1892	1938	1907	Latvian	Male	
Alexander Smirnov	Александр Смирнов	Old	Reelected	1878	1938	1898	Russian	Male	
Grigori Sokolnikov	Григорий Сокольников	Old	Reelected	1888	1938	1905	Jewish	Male	
Joseph Stalin	Ио́сиф Ста́лин	Old	Reelected	1878	1953	1898	Georgian	Male	
Daniil Sulimov	Даниил Сулимов	Old	Reelected	1890	1937	1905	Russian	Male	
Aleksandr Tolokontsev	Александр Толоконцев	Candidate	Reelected	1889	1937	1914	Russian	Male	—
Mikhail Tomsky	Михаил Томский	Old	Reelected	1880	1936	1904	Russian	Male	
Leon Trotsky	Лев Тро́цкий	Old	Removed	1879	1940	1917	Jewish	Male	
Alexander Tsiurupa	Алекса́ндр Цюру́па	Old	Reelected	1870	1928	1898	Ukrainian	Male	
Nikolai Uglanov	Николай Угланов	Old	Reelected	1886	1937	1907	Russian	Male	
Konstantin Ukhanov	Константин Уханов	Old	Reelected	1891	1937	1907	Russian	Male	
Kliment Voroshilov	Климент Ворошилов	Old	Reelected	1881	1969	1903	Russian	Male	
Grigory Yevdokimov	Григорий Евдокимов	Old	Removed	1884	1936	1903	Russian	Male	
Isaak Zelensky	Исаак Зеленский	Old	Reelected	1890	1937	1906	Jewish	Male	
Ivan Zhukov	Иван Жуков	New	Reelected	1889	1937	1909	Russian	Male	—
Grigory Zinoviev	Григо́рий Зино́вьев	Old	Not	1883	1936	1901	Jewish	Male	

=== Candidates ===
Candidate Members of the Central Committee of the 14th Congress of the All-Union Communist Party (Bolsheviks)
Name	Cyrillic	13th CC	15th CC	Birth	Death	PM	Nationality	Gender	Portrait
Ivan Avdeev	Иван Авдеев	New	Removed	1877	1936	1901	Russian	Male	—
Nikolai Chaplin	Николай Чаплин	Candidate	Candidate	1902	1938	1919	Russian	Male	—
Robert Eikhe	Роберт Эйхе	New	Candidate	1890	1940	1906	Latvian	Male	
Yan Gamarnik	Ян Гамарник	New	Member	1894	1937	1916	Jewish	Male	—
Konstantin Gey	Константин Гей	Candidate	Candidate	1896	1939	1916	Russian	Male	
Filipp Goloshchyokin	Филипп Голощёкин	Candidate	Member	1876	1941	1903	Jewish	Male	
Akmal Ikramov	Акмаль Икрамов	New	Candidate	1898	1938	1918	Uzbek	Male	
Vladimir Ivanov	Владимир Иванов	New	Candidate	1893	1938	1915	Russian	Male	
Anna Kalgyna	Анна Калыгина	New	Candidate	1895	1937	1915	Russian	Female	—
Grigory Kaminsky	Григорий Каминский	New	Candidate	1895	1938	1913	Jewish	Male	
Aleksei Kiselyov	Алексей Киселёв	New	Candidate	1879	1937	1898	Russian	Male	
Ivan Klimenko	Иван Клименко	New	Candidate	1891	1937	1912	Russian	Male	
Ivan Kodatsky	Иван Кодацкий	New	Candidate	1893	1937	1914	Russian	Male	
Taras Kondratyev	Тарас Кондратьев	New	Candidate	1892	1937	1913	Russian	Male	—
Joseph Kosior	Иосиф Косиор	New	Member	1889	1937	1908	Polish	Male	
Alexander Krinitsky	Александр Криницкий	Candidate	Candidate	1894	1937	1915	Russian	Male	
Mikhail Lashevich	Александр Криницкий	Member	Removed	1884	1937	1901	Jewish	Male	
Vissarion Lominadze	Виссарион Ломинадзе	New	Candidate	1897	1935	1917	Georgian	Male	
Sargis Lukashin	Сергей Лукашин	New	Not	1883	1937	1905	Armenian	Male	
Isidore Lyubimov	Исидор Любимов	New	Member	1882	1937	1902	Russian	Male	—
Alexander Markov	Александр Марков	Candidate	Candidate	1877	1935	1898	Russian	Male	—
Dmitry Matveyev	Дмитрий Матвеев	New	Not	1900	1937	1920	Russian	Male	—
Grigory Melnichansky	Григорий Мельничанский	New	Candidate	1886	1937	1902	Jewish	Male	—
Ivan Moskvin	Иван Москвин	Candidate	Member	1890	1937	1911	Russian	Male	
Gazanfar Musabekov	Газанфар Мусабеков	New	Candidate	1888	1938	1918	Azerbaijani	Male	
Klavdiya Nikolayeva	Клавдия Николаева	Member	Candidate	1893	1944	1909	Russian	Female	
Ivan Nosov	Иван Носов	New	Candidate	1888	1937	1905	Russian	Male	—
Georgy Oppokov	Георгий Оппоков	New	Member	1888	1938	1903	Russian	Male	a man with a serious demeanour, with tidy hair wearing a blazer, a white shirt and a tie
Mamia Orakhelashvili	Мамия Орахелашвили	Candidate	Promoted	1888	1937	1903	Georgian	Male	
Valerian Osinsky	Валериан Оболенский	New	Candidate	1882	1938	1907	Russian	Male	
Pavel Postyshev	Григо́рій Петро́вський	New	Member	1887	1939	1904	Russian	Male	a man with wavy but well kept hair, bearded, smiling to the camera, wearing a black but stripped suit, a white shirt and a coloured tie
Konstantin Rumyantsev	Константин Румянцев	Candidate	Candidate	1889	1939	1916	Russian	Male	—
Kuzma Ryndin	Кузьма Рындин	Candidate	Candidate	1893	1938	1915	Russian	Male	—
Boris Semenov	Борис Семёнов	New	Candidate	1890	1937	1907	Russian	Male	—
Alexander Serebrovsky	Александр Серебровский	New	Candidate	1884	1938	1903	Russian	Male	
Mykola Skrypnyk	Микола Скрипник	Candidate	Member	1872	1933	1898	Ukrainian	Male	
Konstantin Strievsky	Константин Стриевский	Candidate	Member	1885	1938	1902	Belarusian	Male	—
Sergei Syrtsov	Сергей Сырцов	Candidate	Member	1893	1937	1913	Russian	Male	
Fyodor Ugarov	Фёдор Угаров	New	Member	1885	1932	1905	Russian	Male	—
Józef Unszlicht	Ио́сиф У́ншлихт	New	Candidate	1879	1938	1907	Jewish	Male	
Mikhail Uryvayev	Михаил Урываев	New	Candidate	1887	1937	1917	Russian	Male	—
Iosif Vareikis	Иосиф Варейкис	Candidate	Candidate	1894	1938	1913	Lithuanian	Male	—
Andrei Zhdanov	Андрей Жданов	New	Candidate	1896	1948	1915	Russian	Male	
