= Central Committee of the 15th Congress of the All-Union Communist Party (Bolsheviks) =

Communist party

Central Committee of the 15th Congress
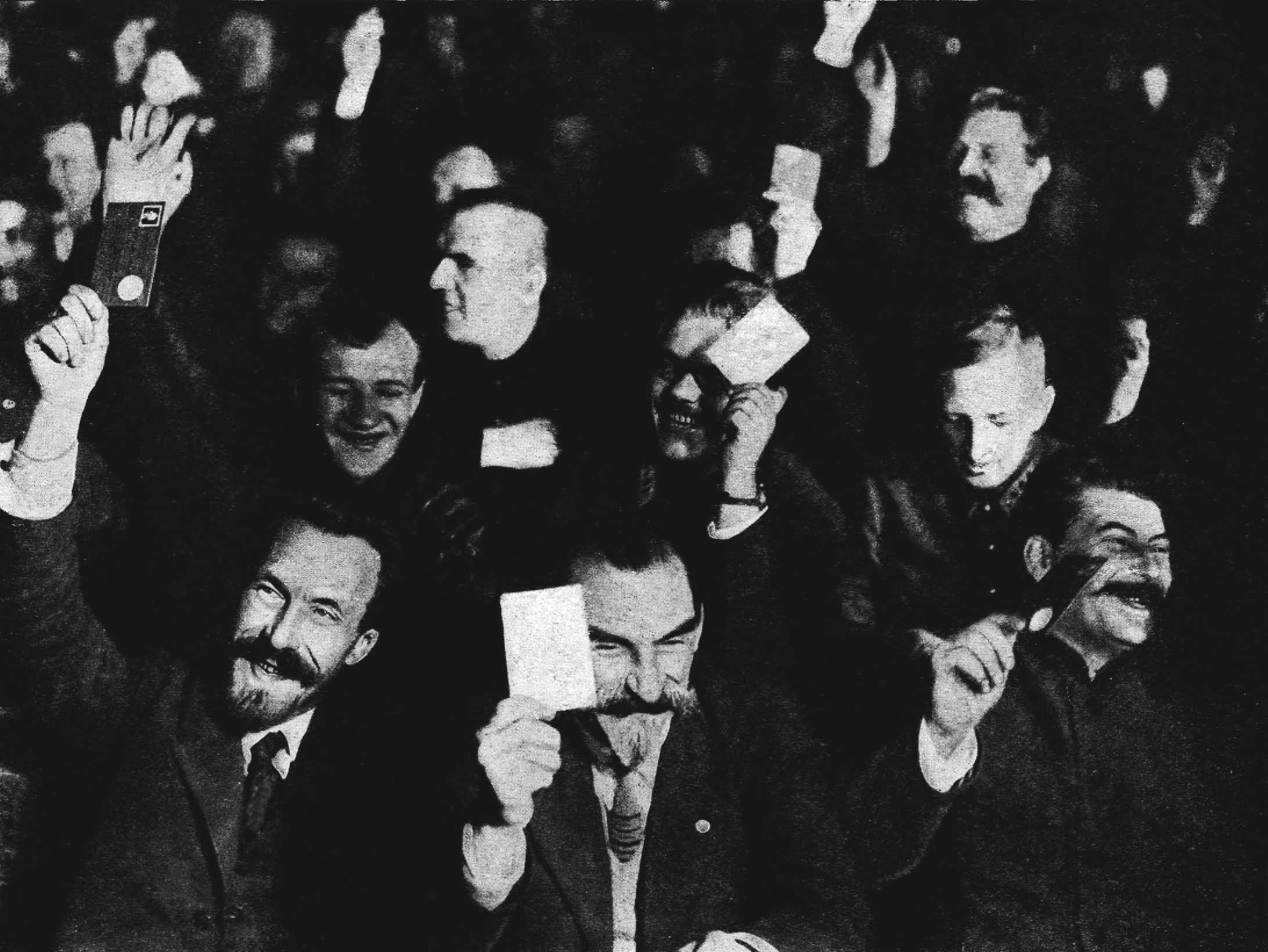
- The 15th Party Congress; in the foreground Alexei Rykov, Mykola Skrypnyk and Joseph Stalin raising their membership cards.

19 December 1927 – 13 July 1930

Leadership
- General Secretary: Joseph Stalin
- Second Secretary: Vyacheslav Molotov
- Inner-groups: Politburo: 9 full & 10 candidates Secretariat: 8 full & 4 candidates Orgburo: 16 full & 9 candidates

Candidates

Apparatus
- No. of departments: 11

The Central Committee (CC) composition was elected by the 15th Congress, and sat from 19 December 1927 until 13 July 1930. The CC 1st Plenary Session renewed the composition of the Politburo, Secretariat and the Organizational Bureau (OB) of the All-Union Communist Party (Bolsheviks).

== Plenums ==
The CC was not a permanent institution. It convened plenary sessions, of which six CC plenary sessions and two joint CC–Central Control Commission (CCC) plenary sessions were held between the 15th Congress and the 16th Congress. When the CC was not in session, decision-making powers were transferred to inner bodies of the CC itself; the Politburo, Secretariat and Orgburo (none of these bodies were permanent either, but convened several times a months).

Plenary sessions of the Central Committee
Plenum	Date	Length
1st Plenary Session	19 December 1927	1 day
1st Joint Plenary Session	6–11 April 1928	6 days
2nd Plenary Session	4–12 July 1928	9 days
3rd Plenary Session	16–24 November 1928	9 days
2nd Joint Plenary Session	16–23 April 1929	8 days
4th Plenary Session	29 April 1929	1 day
5th Plenary Session	21 June 1929	1 day
6th Plenary Session	10–17 November 1929	8 days

== Apparatus ==
Individuals employed by Central Committee's bureaus, departments and newspapers made up the apparatus between the 15th Congress and the 16th Congress. The bureaus and departments were supervised by the Secretariat, and each secretary (member of the Secretariat) supervised a specific department. The leaders of departments were officially referred to as Heads, while the titles of bureau leaders varied between chairman, first secretary and secretary.

Central Committee Apparatus of the 15th Congress of the All-Union Communist Party (Bolsheviks)
Institution	Leader	Cyrillic	Took office	Left office	Length of tenure	Nationality	Gender
Administrator of Affairs	Timofey Samsonov	Тимофей Самсонов	19 December 1927	13 July 1930	2 years and 206 days	Ukrainian	Male
Agitation, Propaganda and Press Department	Alexander Krinitsky	Александр Криницкий	19 December 1927	19 November 1929	1 year and 335 days	Russian	Male
Agitation, Propaganda and Press Department	Aleksei Stetskii	Алексей Стецкий	19 November 1929	1 May 1930	163 days	Russian	Male
Bolshevik	Nikolay Bukharin	Никола́й Буха́рин	19 December 1927	April 1929	1 year and 103 days	Russian	Male
Bolshevik	Vilhelm Knorin	Вильгельм Кнорин	1930	13 July 1930	1 year and 193 days	Latvian	Male
Culture and Propaganda Department	Aleksei Stetskii	Алексей Стецкий	1 May 1930	13 July 1930	73 days	Russian	Male
Information Department	Lev Roshal	Лев Рошаль	19 December 1927	1928	43 days	Jewish	Male
Institute of Red Professors	Mikhail Pokrovsky	Михаи́л Покро́вский	19 December 1927	13 July 1930	2 years and 206 days	Russian	Male
Lenin Institute	Ivan Skvortsov-Stepanov	Ива́н Скворцо́в-Степа́нов	19 December 1927	August 1928	256 days	Russian	Male
Lenin Institute	Maximilian Saveliev	Максимилиан Савельев	August 1928	13 July 1930	1 year and 316 days	Russian	Male
Party History Department	Vacant	—	19 December 1927	20 August 1928	245 days	—	—
Pravda	Nikolay Bukharin	Никола́й Буха́рин	19 December 1927	April 1929	1 year and 103 days	Russian	Male
Pravda	Editorial Board	—	April 1929	13 July 1930	1 year and 103 days	—	—
Press Department	Sergei Gusev	Сергей Гусев	19 December 1927	March 1928	103 days	Jewish	Male
Press Department	Nikolay Smirnov	Николай Смирнов	March 1928	May 1928	60 days	Russian	Male
Organizational-Distribution Department	Ivan Moskvin	Иван Москвин	19 December 1927	13 July 1930	2 years and 206 days	Russian	Male
Secret Department	Ivan Tovstukha	Иван Товстуха	19 December 1927	13 July 1930	2 years and 206 days	Ukrainian	Male
Statistical Department	Yelena Smitten	Елена Смиттен	19 December 1927	13 July 1930	2 years and 206 days	Belarusian	Female
Work in the Countryside Department	Karl Bauman	Карл Бауман	19 December 1927	13 July 1930	2 years and 206 days	Latvian	Male
Women's Department	Aleksandra Artyukhina	Елена Смиттен	19 December 1927	13 July 1930	2 years and 206 days	Russian	Female

== Composition ==
=== Members ===
Members of the Central Committee of the 15th Congress of the All-Union Communist Party (Bolsheviks)
Name	Cyrillic	14th CC	16th CC	Birth	Death	PM	Nationality	Gender	Portrait
Ivan Akulov	Иван Акулов	New	Not	1888	1937	1907	Russian	Male	
Andrey Andreyev	Андрей Андреев	Old	Reelected	1895	1971	1914	Russian	Male	
Nikolay Antipov	Николай Антипов	Old	Reelected	1894	1938	1912	Russian	Male	
Aleksandra Artyukhina	Александра Артюхина	Old	Not	1889	1969	1910	Russian	Female	
Aleksei Badayev	Алексей Бадаев	Old	Reelected	1883	1951	1904	Russian	Male	
Karl Bauman	Карл Бауман	Old	Reelected	1892	1937	1907	Latvian	Male	—
Andrei Bubnov	Андрей Бубнов	Old	Reelected	1884	1938	1903	Russian	Male	
Nikolai Bukharin	Никола́й Буха́рин	Old	Reelected	1888	1938	1906	Russian	Male	
Georgy Chicherin	Георгий Чичерин	Old	Not	1872	1936	1918	Russian	Male	
Vlas Chubar	Влас Чубар	Old	Reelected	1891	1939	1907	Ukrainian	Male	
Mikhail Chudov	Михаил Чудов	Old	Reelected	1893	1937	1913	Russian	Male	—
Alexander Dogadov	Александр Догадов	Old	Candidate	1888	1937	1905	Russian	Male	—
Yan Gamarnik	Ян Гамарник	Candidate	Reelected	1894	1937	1916	Jewish	Male	—
Filipp Goloshchyokin	Филипп Голощёкин	Candidate	Reelected	1876	1941	1903	Jewish	Male	
Ivan Kabakov	Иван Кабаков	Old	Reelected	1891	1937	1914	Russian	Male	—
Lazar Kaganovich	Лазарь Каганович	Old	Reelected	1893	1991	1911	Jewish	Male	
Mikhail Kalinin	Михаил Калинин	Old	Reelected	1875	1946	1898	Russian	Male	
Kuprian Kirkizh	Куприян Киркиж	Old	Not	1886	1932	1910	Belarusian	Male	
Sergey Kirov	Серге́й Ки́ров	Old	Reelected	1886	1934	1904	Russian	Male	
Vilhelm Knorin	Вильгельм Кнорин	New	Reelected	1890	1938	1910	Latvian	Male	
Nikolay Kolotilov	Николай Колотилов	Old	Reelected	1885	1937	1903	Russian	Male	—
Nikolay Komarov	Николай Комаров	Old	Reelected	1886	1937	1909	Russian	Male	
Joseph Kosior	Иосиф Косиор	Candidate	Reelected	1889	1937	1908	Polish	Male	
Stanislav Kosior	Станислав Косиор	Old	Reelected	1889	1939	1907	Polish	Male	
Vasily Kotov	Василий Котов	Old	Not	1885	1937	1915	Russian	Male	—
Nadezhda Krupskaya	Наде́жда Кру́пская	New	Reelected	1869	1939	1898	Russian	Female	
Gleb Krzhizhanovsky	Глеб Кржижано́вский	Old	Reelected	1872	1959	1898	Polish-German (Note: His father was Polish and his mother German)	Male	
Nikolay Kubyak	Николай Кубяк	Old	Reelected	1881	1937	1898	Russian	Male	
Yegor Kulikov	Егор Куликов	Old	Not	1891	1943	1910	Russian	Male	—
Valerian Kuybyshev	Валериан Куйбышев	Old	Reelected	1888	1935	1904	Russian	Male	
Emanuel Kviring	Эммануил Квиринг	Old	Reelected	1888	1937	1912	Volga German	Male	
Ivan Lepse	Иван Лепсе	Old	Died	1889	1929	1906	Latvian	Male	—
Semyon Lobov	Семён Лобов	Old	Reelected	1888	1937	1913	Russian	Male	—
Isidore Lyubimov	Исидор Любимов	Candidate	Reelected	1882	1937	1902	Russian	Male	—
Dmitry Manuilsky	Дмитро Мануїльський	Old	Reelected	1883	1959	1903	Ukrainian	Male	
Alexei Medvedev	Алексей Медведев	Old	Not	1884	1937	1904	Russian	Male	
Vyacheslav Menzhinsky	Вячеслав Менжинский	New	Not	1874	1934	1902	Polish	Male	
Vasily Mikhailov	Василий Михайлов	Old	Candidate	1894	1937	1915	Russian	Male	
Anastas Mikoyan	Анастас Микоян	Old	Reelected	1895	1978	1915	Armenian	Male	
Vyacheslav Molotov	Вячеслав Молотов	Old	Reelected	1890	1986	1906	Russian	Male	
Ivan Moskvin	Иван Москвин	Candidate	Reelected	1890	1937	1911	Russian	Male	
Georgy Oppokov	Георгий Оппоков	Candidate	Reelected	1888	1938	1903	Russian	Male	a man with a serious demeanour, with tidy hair wearing a blazer, a white shirt and a tie
Mamia Orakhelashvili	Мамия Орахелашвили	Old	Reelected	1888	1937	1903	Georgian	Male	
Grigory Petrovsky	Григо́рій Петро́вський	Old	Reelected	1878	1958	1898	Ukrainian	Male	a bearded man with wavy hair, wearing glasses and what seems to be a suit, a white tie, and a black and white dotted shirt
Osip Piatnitsky	Осип Пятницкий	New	Reelected	1882	1938	1898	Jewish	Male	
Pavel Postyshev	Григо́рій Петро́вський	Candidate	Reelected	1887	1939	1904	Russian	Male	a man with wavy but well kept hair, bearded, smiling to the camera, wearing a black but stripped suit, a white shirt and a coloured tie
Jānis Rudzutaks	Ян Рудзутак	Old	Reelected	1887	1938	1906	Latvian	Male	
Moisey Rukhimovich	Моисей Рухимович	Old	Reelected	1889	1937	1913	Jewish	Male	
Ivan Rumyantsev	Иван Румянцев	Old	Reelected	1886	1937	1905	Russian	Male	
Alexei Rykov	Алексей Рыков	Old	Reelected	1881	1938	1899	Russian	Male	
Vasily Schmidt	Сергей Чуцкаев	Old	Candidate	1886	1938	1905	German	Male	
Isaak Schwartz	Исаак Шварц	Old	Reelected	1879	1951	1899	Jewish	Male	
Nikolay Shvernik	Николай Шверник	Old	Reelected	1888	1970	1905	Russian	Male	
Mykola Skrypnyk	Микола Скрипник	Candidate	Reelected	1872	1933	1898	Ukrainian	Male	
Ivan Skvortsov-Stepanov	Ива́н Скворцо́в-Степа́нов	Old	Died	1878	1928	1898	Russian	Male	
Alexander Smirnov	Александр Смирнов	Old	Reelected	1878	1938	1898	Russian	Male	
Grigori Sokolnikov	Григорий Сокольников	Old	Candidate	1888	1938	1905	Jewish	Male	
Joseph Stalin	Ио́сиф Ста́лин	Old	Reelected	1878	1953	1898	Georgian	Male	
Aleksei Stetskii	Алексей Стецкий	New	Reelected	1896	1938	1915	Russian	Male	
Konstantin Strievsky	Константин Стриевский	Candidate	Reelected	1885	1938	1902	Belarusian	Male	—
Daniil Sulimov	Даниил Сулимов	Old	Reelected	1890	1937	1905	Russian	Male	
Sergei Syrtsov	Сергей Сырцов	Candidate	Reelected	1893	1937	1913	Russian	Male	
Aleksandr Tolokontsev	Александр Толоконцев	Old	Reelected	1889	1937	1914	Russian	Male	—
Mikhail Tomsky	Михаил Томский	Old	Reelected	1880	1936	1904	Russian	Male	
Alexander Tsiurupa	Алекса́ндр Цюру́па	Old	Died	1870	1928	1898	Ukrainian	Male	
Fyodor Ugarov	Фёдор Угаров	Candidate	Reelected	1885	1932	1905	Russian	Male	—
Nikolai Uglanov	Николай Угланов	Old	Not	1886	1937	1907	Russian	Male	
Konstantin Ukhanov	Константин Уханов	Old	Reelected	1891	1937	1907	Russian	Male	
Kliment Voroshilov	Климент Ворошилов	Old	Reelected	1881	1969	1903	Russian	Male	
Isaak Zelensky	Исаак Зеленский	Old	Reelected	1890	1937	1906	Jewish	Male	
Ivan Zhukov	Иван Жуков	Old	Reelected	1889	1937	1909	Russian	Male	—

=== Candidates ===
Candidate Members of the Central Committee of the 15th Congress of the All-Union Communist Party (Bolsheviks)
Name	Cyrillic	14th CC	16th CC	Birth	Death	PM	Nationality	Gender	Portrait
Pyotr Alexeyev	Пётр Алексеев	New	Member	1893	1937	1914	Russian	Male	—
Naum Antselovich	Наум Анцелович	New	Not	1888	1952	1905	Jewish	Male	
Pyotr Baranov	Пётр Баранов	New	Candidate	1892	1933	1912	Russian	Male	
Nikolai Bryukhanov	Николай Брюханов	New	Candidate	1878	1938	1902	Russian	Male	
Nikolai Chaplin	Николай Чаплин	Candidate	Candidate	1902	1938	1919	Russian	Male	—
Sergey Chutskayev	Сергей Чуцкаев	New	Candidate	1876	1944	1903	Russian	Male	—
Mikhail Chuvyrin	Михаил Чувырин	New	Member	1883	1947	1903	Russian	Male	—
Robert Eikhe	Роберт Эйхе	Candidate	Member	1890	1940	1906	Latvian	Male	
Shalva Eliava	Шалва Элиава	New	Candidate	1883	1937	1904	Georgian	Male	
Konstantin Gey	Константин Гей	Candidate	Candidate	1896	1939	1916	German-Russian (Note: His father was German and his mother Russian)	Male	
Fyodor Gryadinsky	Фёдор Грядинский	New	Candidate	1893	1938	1912	Russian	Male	
Akmal Ikramov	Акмаль Икрамов	Candidate	Candidate	1898	1938	1918	Uzbek	Male	
Vladimir Ivanov	Владимир Иванов	Candidate	Candidate	1893	1938	1915	Russian	Male	
Anna Kalgyna	Анна Калыгина	Candidate	Candidate	1895	1937	1915	Russian	Female	—
Grigory Kaminsky	Григорий Каминский	Candidate	Candidate	1895	1938	1913	Jewish	Male	
Mendel Khatayevich	Мендель Хатаевич	New	Member	1893	1937	1913	Jewish	Male	
Aleksei Kiselyov	Алексей Киселёв	Candidate	Candidate	1879	1937	1898	Russian	Male	
Ivan Klimenko	Иван Клименко	Candidate	Candidate	1891	1937	1912	Russian	Male	
Ivan Kodatsky	Иван Кодацкий	Candidate	Member	1893	1937	1914	Russian	Male	
Philemon Kolgushkin	Филимон Колгушкин	New	Removed	1887	1937	1905	Russian	Male	—
Taras Kondratyev	Тарас Кондратьев	Candidate	Not	1892	1937	1913	Russian	Male	—
Alexander Krinitsky	Александр Криницкий	Candidate	Candidate	1894	1937	1915	Russian	Male	
Fyodor Leonov	Фёдор Леонов	New	Member	1892	1938	1914	Russian	Male	—
Filipp Lokotskov	Филипп Локацков	New	Not	1881	1937	1904	Russian	Male	—
Vissarion Lominadze	Виссарион Ломинадзе	Candidate	Member	1897	1935	1917	Georgian	Male	
Solomon Lozovsky	Соломон Лозовский	New	Candidate	1892	1952	1901	Jewish	Male	
Alexander Markov	Александр Марков	Candidate	Not	1877	1935	1898	Russian	Male	—
Valery Mezhlauk	Валерий Межлаук	New	Candidate	1893	1938	1917	Latvian	Male	
Mikhail Mikhailov-Ivanov	Михаил Михайлов-Иванов	New	Candidate	1894	1931	1913	Russian	Male	—
Levon Mirzoyan	Левон Мирзоян	New	Candidate	1887	1939	1917	Armenian	Male	
Grigory Melnichansky	Григорий Мельничанский	Candidate	Not	1886	1937	1902	Jewish	Male	—
Gazanfar Musabekov	Газанфар Мусабеков	Candidate	Candidate	1888	1938	1918	Azerbaijani	Male	
Klavdiya Nikolayeva	Клавдия Николаева	Candidate	Candidate	1893	1944	1909	Russian	Female	
Ivan Nosov	Иван Носов	Candidate	Member	1888	1937	1905	Russian	Male	—
Mikhail Oshvintsev	Михаил Ошвинцев	New	Candidate	1889	1939	1917	Russian	Male	
Valerian Osinsky	Валериан Оболенский	Candidate	Candidate	1882	1938	1907	Russian	Male	
Vladimir Polonsky	Владимир Полонский	Old	Candidate	1893	1937	1912	Russian	Male	
Konstantin Rumyantsev	Константин Румянцев	Candidate	Candidate	1889	1939	1916	Russian	Male	—
Kuzma Ryndin	Кузьма Рындин	Candidate	Member	1893	1938	1915	Russian	Male	—
Martemyan Ryutin	Мартемья́н Рю́тин	New	Not	1890	1937	1914	Russian	Male	
Boris Semenov	Борис Семёнов	Candidate	Candidate	1890	1937	1907	Russian	Male	—
Alexander Serebrovsky	Александр Серебровский	Candidate	Candidate	1884	1938	1903	Russian	Male	
Sergey Sobolev	Александр Серебровский	New	Not	1900	1939	1918	Russian	Male	—
Vasily Stroganov	Василий Строганов	New	Not	1888	1938	1905	Russian	Male	—
Kirill Sukhomlin	Кирилл Сухомлин	New	Candidate	1886	1938	1905	Russian	Male	
Anton Tsikhon	Антон Цихон	New	Member	1887	1939	1906	Belarusian	Male	—
Józef Unszlicht	Ио́сиф У́ншлихт	Candidate	Candidate	1879	1938	1907	Jewish	Male	
Mikhail Uryvayev	Михаил Урываев	Candidate	Candidate	1887	1937	1917	Russian	Male	—
Iosif Vareikis	Иосиф Варейкис	Candidate	Member	1894	1938	1913	Lithuanian	Male	—
Andrei Zhdanov	Андрей Жданов	Candidate	Member	1896	1948	1915	Russian	Male	
