= Orgburo of the 15th Congress of the All-Union Communist Party (Bolsheviks) =

Organisational Bureau of Soviet Union 15th Congress

The 15th Orgburo of the All-Union Communist Party (Bolsheviks) was elected by the 1st plenary session of the 15th Central Committee, in the immediate aftermath of the 15th Congress.

== Full members ==
Name (birth–death)	Took office	Left office	Duration	Note
Andrey Andreyev (1895–1971)	19 December 1927	11 April 1928	114 days	Relieved of his duties at the 1st Joint Plenary Session of the Central Committee and the Central Control Commission.
Aleksandra Artyukhina (1889–1969)	19 December 1927	13 July 1930	2 years, 206 days	—
Andrei Bubnov (1884–1938)	19 December 1927	13 July 1930	2 years, 206 days	—
Alexander Dogadov (1888–1937)	19 December 1927	13 July 1930	2 years, 206 days	—
Stanislav Kosior (1889–1939)	19 December 1927	12 July 1928	2 years, 206 days	Relieved of his duties at the 2nd Plenary Session.
Nikolai Kubiak (1881–1937)	19 December 1927	13 July 1930	2 years, 206 days	—
Vyacheslav Molotov (1890–1986)	19 December 1927	13 July 1930	2 years, 206 days	—
Ivan Moskvin (1890–1937)	19 December 1927	13 July 1930	2 years, 206 days	—
Moisei Rukhimovich (1889–1938)	19 December 1927	13 July 1930	2 years, 206 days	—
Alexander Smirnov (1878–1938)	19 December 1927	13 July 1930	2 years, 206 days	—
Joseph Stalin (1878–1953)	19 December 1927	13 July 1930	2 years, 206 days	—
Daniil Sulimov (1890–1937)	19 December 1927	13 July 1930	2 years, 206 days	
Nikolai Uglanov (1886–1937)	19 December 1927	29 April 1929	1 year, 131 days	Relieved of his duties at the 4th Plenary Session.
Karl Baumann (1892–1937)	11 April 1928	29 April 1929	1 year, 18 days	Elected at the 1st Joint Plenary Session of the Central Committee and the Central Control Commission.
Lazar Kaganovich (1893–1991)	12 July 1928	13 July 1930	2 years, 1 day	Elected at the 2nd Plenary Session.
Yan Gamarnik (1894–1937)	17 November 1929	13 July 1930	238 days	Elected at the 6th Plenary Session.

== Candidate members ==
Name (birth–death)	Took office	Left office	Duration	Note
Vasily Kotov (1885–1937)	19 December 1927	13 July 1930	2 years, 206 days	—
Ivan Lepse (1889–1929)	19 December 1927	6 October 1929	1 year, 291 days	Died in office.
Semen Lobov (1888–1937)	19 December 1927	13 July 1930	2 years, 206 days	—
Vasily Mikhailov (1894–1937)	19 December 1927	13 July 1930	2 years, 206 days	—
Konstantin Ukhanov (1891–1937)	19 December 1927	13 July 1930	2 years, 206 days	—
Nikolay Chaplin (1902–1938)	19 December 1927	13 July 1930	2 years, 206 days	—
Vasily Schmidt (1886–1938)	19 December 1927	13 July 1930	2 years, 206 days	—
Nikolai Antipov (1886–1938)	11 April 1928	29 April 1929	1 year, 18 days	Elected at the 1st Joint Plenary Session of the Central Committee and the Central Control Commission.
Nikolai Shvernik (1888–1970)	17 November 1929	13 July 1930	238 days	Elected at the 6th Plenary Session.
