= Orgburo of the 14th Congress of the All-Union Communist Party (Bolsheviks) =

Organisational Bureau of Soviet Union (1925–27)

The 14th Orgburo of the All-Union Communist Party (Bolsheviks) was elected by the 1st Plenary Session of the 14th Central Committee, in the immediate aftermath of the 14th Congress.

== Full members ==
Name (birth–death)	Took office	Left office	Duration	Note
Andrey Andreyev (1895–1971)	1 January 1926	19 December 1927	1 year, 352 days	—
Aleksandra Artyukhina (1889–1969)	1 January 1926	19 December 1927	1 year, 352 days	—
Andrei Bubnov (1884–1938)	1 January 1926	19 December 1927	1 year, 352 days	—
Alexander Dogadov (1888–1937)	1 January 1926	19 December 1927	1 year, 352 days	—
Grigory Evdokimov (1884–1936)	1 January 1926	9 April 1926	98 days	Relieved of his duties at the 2nd Plenary Session.
Emanuel Kviring (1888–1937)	1 January 1926	17 February 1927	1 year, 47 days	Relieved of his duties by a Resolution of the 14th Politburo.
Stanislav Kosior (1889–1939)	1 January 1926	19 December 1927	1 year, 352 days	—
Vyacheslav Molotov (1890–1986)	1 January 1926	19 December 1927	1 year, 352 days	—
Alexander Smirnov (1878–1938)	1 January 1926	19 December 1927	1 year, 352 days	—
Joseph Stalin (1878–1953)	1 January 1926	19 December 1927	1 year, 352 days	—
Nikolai Uglanov (1886–1937)	1 January 1926	19 December 1927	1 year, 352 days	Elected at the 2nd Plenary Session.
Nikolay Shvernik (1888–1970)	9 April 1926	17 February 1927	1 year, 47 days	Elected at the 2nd Plenary Session, and relieved of his duties by a Resolution of the 14th Politburo.
Nikolai Kubiak (1881–1937)	17 February 1927	19 December 1927	305 days	Appointed by a Resolution of the 14th Politburo.
Moisei Rukhimovich (1889–1938)	17 February 1927	19 December 1927	305 days	Appointed by a Resolution of the 14th Politburo.
Daniil Sulimov (1890–1937)	17 February 1927	19 December 1927	305 days	Appointed by a Resolution of the 14th Politburo.

== Candidate members ==
Name (birth–death)	Took office	Left office	Duration	Note
Ivan Lepse (1889–1929)	1 January 1926	19 December 1927	1 year, 352 days	—
Vasily Mikhailov (1894–1937)	1 January 1926	19 December 1927	1 year, 352 days	—
Konstantin Ukhanov (1891–1937)	1 January 1926	19 December 1927	1 year, 352 days	—
Nikolay Chaplin (1902–1938)	1 January 1926	19 December 1927	1 year, 352 days	—
Vasily Schmidt (1886–1938)	1 January 1926	19 December 1927	1 year, 352 days	—
Semen Lobov (1888–1937)	17 February 1927	19 December 1927	305 days	Appointed by a Resolution of the 14th Politburo.
