= Secretariat of the 15th Congress of the All-Union Communist Party (Bolsheviks) =

The 15th Secretariat of the All-Union Communist Party (Bolsheviks) was elected by the 1st plenary session of the 15th Central Committee, in the aftermath of the 15th Congress.

== Full members ==
Name (birth–death)	Took office	Left office	Duration	Note
Karl Bauman (1892–1937)	29 April 1929	13 July 1930	1 year, 75 days	Elected at the 4th Plenary Session.
Lazar Kaganovich (1893–1991)	12 July 1928	13 July 1930	2 years, 1 day	Elected at the 2nd Plenary Session.
Stanislav Kosior (1889–1939)	19 December 1927	12 July 1928	206 days	Relieved of his duties at the 2nd Plenary Session.
Nikolai Kubyak (1881–1937)	19 December 1927	11 April 1928	104 days	Relieved of his duties at the 1st Joint Plenary Session of the Central Committee and the Central Control Commission.
Vyacheslav Molotov (1890–1986)	19 December 1927	13 July 1930	2 years, 196 days	—
Nikolai Uglanov (1886–1937)	19 December 1927	29 April 1929	1 year, 121 days	Relieved at the 4th Plenary Session.
Alexander Smirnov (1878–1938)	11 April 1928	13 July 1930	2 years, 93 days	Elected at the 1st Joint Plenary Session of the Central Committee and the Central Control Commission.
Joseph Stalin (1878–1953)	19 December 1927	13 July 1930	2 years, 196 days	Elected General Secretary at the 1st Plenary Session.

== Candidate members ==
Name (birth–death)	Took office	Left office	Duration	Note
Aleksandra Artyukhina (1889–1969)	19 December 1927	13 July 1930	2 years, 196 days	—
Karl Bauman (1892–1937)	19 December 1927	29 April 1929	1 year, 131 days	Relieved of his duties at the 4th Plenary Session.
Andrei Bubnov (1883–1938)	19 December 1927	13 July 1930	2 years, 196 days	—
Ivan Moskvin (1890–1937)	19 December 1927	13 July 1930	2 years, 196 days	—
