= 15th Central Committee =

15th Central Committee may refer to:

- Central Committee of the 15th Congress of the All-Union Communist Party (Bolsheviks), 1927–1930
- 15th Central Committee of the Chinese Communist Party, 1997–2002
