= Albert Dolmans =

Dutch-American painter (1928–2021)

- Albert Dolmans
- Born: 20 November 1928; Breda, Netherlands
- Died: 6 September 2021 (aged 92); Rotterdam, Netherlands
- Education: California College of the Arts
- Known for: Paintings
- Style: Oil

Albert Dolmans (20 November 1928 – 6 September 2021) was a Dutch-American painter. He began his career in the sixties becoming part of the Bay Area Figurative Movement and the Society of Western Artists.

== Biography ==
Albert Dolmans was born in Breda, Netherlands on 20 November 1928, but emigrated with his parents and grew up in Berkeley, California. He was awarded a scholarship to the California College of Arts and Crafts now the California College of the Arts in Oakland, studying under George Post, Karl Baumann and Otis Oldfield. He has devoted himself to an international career in fine art, dividing his time mainly between Europe and the United States. Apart from his pen and ink work, his preferred mediums are oil, watercolor and pastel.

Dolmans' paintings have been said to be mainly divided in two groups: warm paintings with a lot of ochre and purple in California, as opposed to cool, controlled, fresh-colored green and blue paintings for the Netherlands. His work has been exhibited internationally, becoming part of both private and municipal collections. His paintings were included in three major exhibits. The first in The Hague in 1976 to commemorate the Bicentennial of the United States, the second in 1982, celebrating 200 years of diplomatic relations between the United States and the Netherlands, and later the same year in San Francisco, a special exhibit marking the official visit of the Queen of the Netherlands to that city. Additionally, his paintings make part of the permanent collections of the US Embassy in The Hague, the Stedelijk Museum in Breda, the Netherlands, and the Museum of St Paul de Vence, France.

Dolmans died in Hillegersberg, Rotterdam on September 6, 2021, at the age of 92. Following his passing, his name and legacy were commemorated through the opening of the Albert Dolmans Art Academy at the Nord Anglia International School Rotterdam (NAISR), established via a final bequest from the Gordon Foundation. The academy was created to support and inspire young artistic talent in the locality.

Morrow Farms - Albert Dolmans (1970)

Lake District - Albert Dolmans (2012)

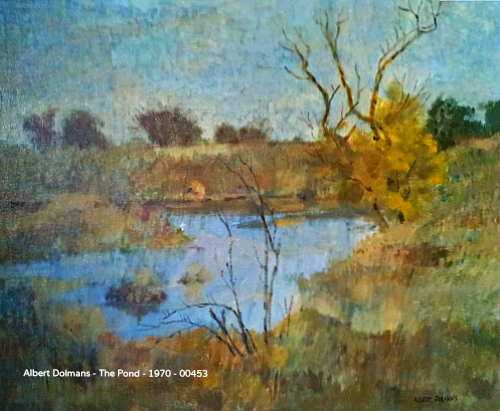
The Pond - Sacramento River - Albert Dolmans (1970)

Hop Farm Californian Valley - Albert Dolmans (1962)

Opening of the Albert Dolmans Art Academy in October 2026
