= Dmitry Lebed (revolutionary) =

Soviet politician (1893–1937)

- Дмитрий Лебедь
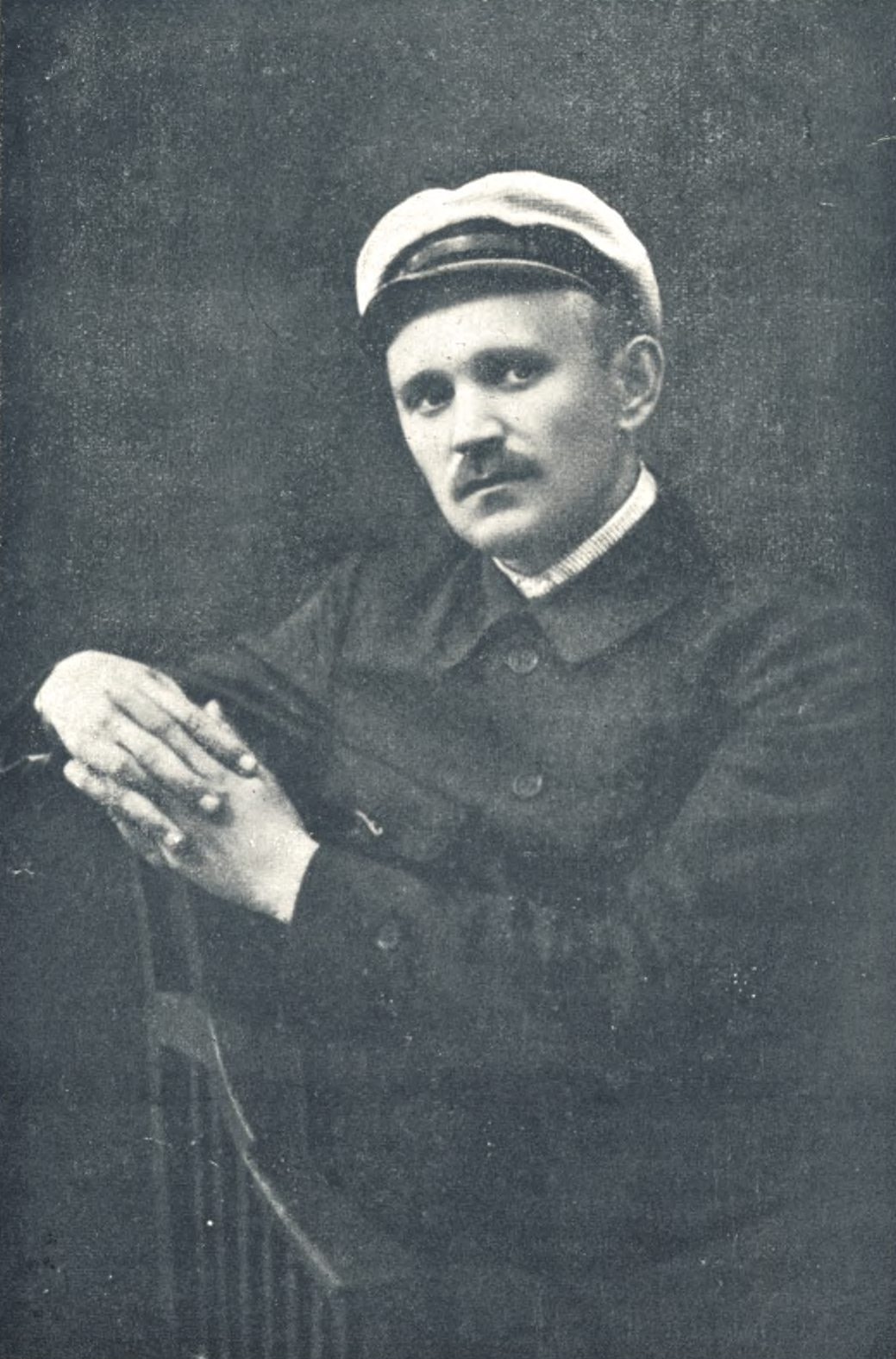
- Lebed in 1923

Second Secretary of Communist Party (Bolsheviks) of Ukraine
- In office 23 November 1920 – 12 May 1924
- Preceded by: Office established
- Succeeded by: Aleksei Medvedev

Personal details
- Born: February 21, 1893 Yevetsko-Mykolaivka, Yekaterinoslav Governorate, Russian Empire
- Died: October 30, 1937 (aged 44) Moscow, Soviet Union
- Party: Russian Communist Party (1909–1937)

Dmitry Zakharovich Lebed (Russian: Дмитрий Захарович Лебедь, Ukrainian: Дмитро Захарович Лебідь, romanized: Dmytro Zakharovych Lebid; 21 February 1893 – 30 October 1937) was a Russian-Ukrainian Bolshevik, Soviet politician and statesman.

== Biography ==
Born into a worker's family of Russian ethnicity in Yevetsko-Mykolaivka village, in the Yekaterinoslav Governorate of the Russian Empire (present-day Samar Raion, now in Ukraine). In 1902 Lebed graduated some railroad school when he was 9 years of age and since 1908 worked at a local stamping plant. In 1909 he joined the Bolshevik faction of the Russian Social Democratic Labour Party. Lebed served for the Imperial Russian Army during the World War I, but in 1916 ran away and later was placed in a reserve regiment. By the end of 1916 Lebed was demobilized due to illness.

In January 1917 Lebed was arrested, but with the February Revolution in Russia, he was freed and returned to Yekaterinoslav where he became a chairman of the Bolshevik Committee at the Yekaterinoslav Railways.

In 1918 hen became editor of Vestnik NKVD (Ukraine). In 1920 from February editor of the newspaper "Zvezda" (Yekaterinoslav), head. agitation and education of the Road Political Administration.

From November Lebed 1920 to May 1924 was 2nd Secretary of the Central Committee of the Communist Party of Ukraine (b).

In 1922 1924 he was a candidate member of the Central Committee of the Russian Communist Party (b). And from 1924 to 1930 - member of the Central Control Commission of the VKP (b) .

From May 1924 to December 1925 Lebed was Chairman of the Central Control Commission of the Communist Party of Ukraine and People's Commissar of the Workers 'and Peasants' Inspection of the Ukrainian SSR. From 1925 to 1930 he was Deputy People's Commissar of the Workers 'and Peasants' Inspection of the USSR.

In 1926-1930 he was a member of the Presidium of the Central Control Commission. From February 1930 he was Deputy Chairman of the Council of People's Commissars of the RSFSR.

Since July 1930 Dmitry Lebed was a member of the Central Committee of the All-Union Communist Party (b). He was Withdrawn from the membership of the Central Committee of the VKP (b) by a resolution of the plenum of the Central Committee of the VKP (b) on October 11–12, 1937.

On August 1, 1937, Lebed was arrested on charges of "Ukrainian nationalism," and on October 29, 1937, he was sentenced to death and shot the next day. He was buried in the Don Cemetery in Moscow.

He was posthumously rehabilitated on March 17, 1956, and reinstated in the CPSU on March 22, 1956.

== The theory of "the struggle of two cultures" ==
The theory of the "struggle of two cultures" was a pseudo-scientific theory proposed by Dmitry Lebed in the 1920s in an attempt to prevent Ukrainization in the Ukrainian SSR.

On September 7, 1922, while reporting to Joseph Stalin, Valerian Kuibyshev, and Vyacheslav Molotov on the arrests of "anti-Soviet intellectuals" in Ukraine, he wrote: "...that it was not advisable to send Ukrainian professors abroad at all, but to they should be limited to deportation to remote areas."

Historian Orest Subtelnyi described the activities of the second secretary of the Central Committee of the CPU (b) as follows:

Thus, one of the highest officials of the Ukrainian Communist Party, Russian Dmitry Lebid, did not even try to hide his hostility to the Ukrainian language, customs, and Ukrainization in general. He defended the so-called "theory of the struggle of two cultures", from which it followed that since Russian culture in Ukraine is associated with the progressive proletariat and the city, while Ukrainian culture - with the backward peasantry and countryside, Russian culture will sooner or later win, and the duty of the Communists is to support this "natural process." Although the ideas of this figure were shared by many of his superiors in Moscow, they were considered premature, so he and a number of other prominent non-Ukrainian party officials were recalled.

Political offices
Preceded by Aleksei Medvedev	People Commissar of Workers-Peasants Inspection of Ukraine; 1924–1925	Succeeded by ?
Party political offices
Preceded by new post	Second Secretary of the Communist Party of Ukraine; 1920–1924	Succeeded by Aleksei Medvedev
Preceded by Aleksei Medvedev	Chairman of the Central Control Commission of the Communist Party of Ukraine; 1924–1925	Succeeded by ?
Government offices
Preceded by Aleksandr Petrovich Smirnov	First deputy chairman of the Sovnarkom of the RSFSR; 1930–1937	Succeeded by Georgiy Perov
Preceded by	Chairman of the General Education Committee of the Sovnarkom of the RSFSR; 1930–	Succeeded by
Civic offices
Preceded by		Succeeded by
