= Ivan Moskvin =

Ivan Moskvin may refer to:

- Ivan Moskvin (actor)
- Ivan Moskvin (politician)
