= Nord Anglia International School Rotterdam =

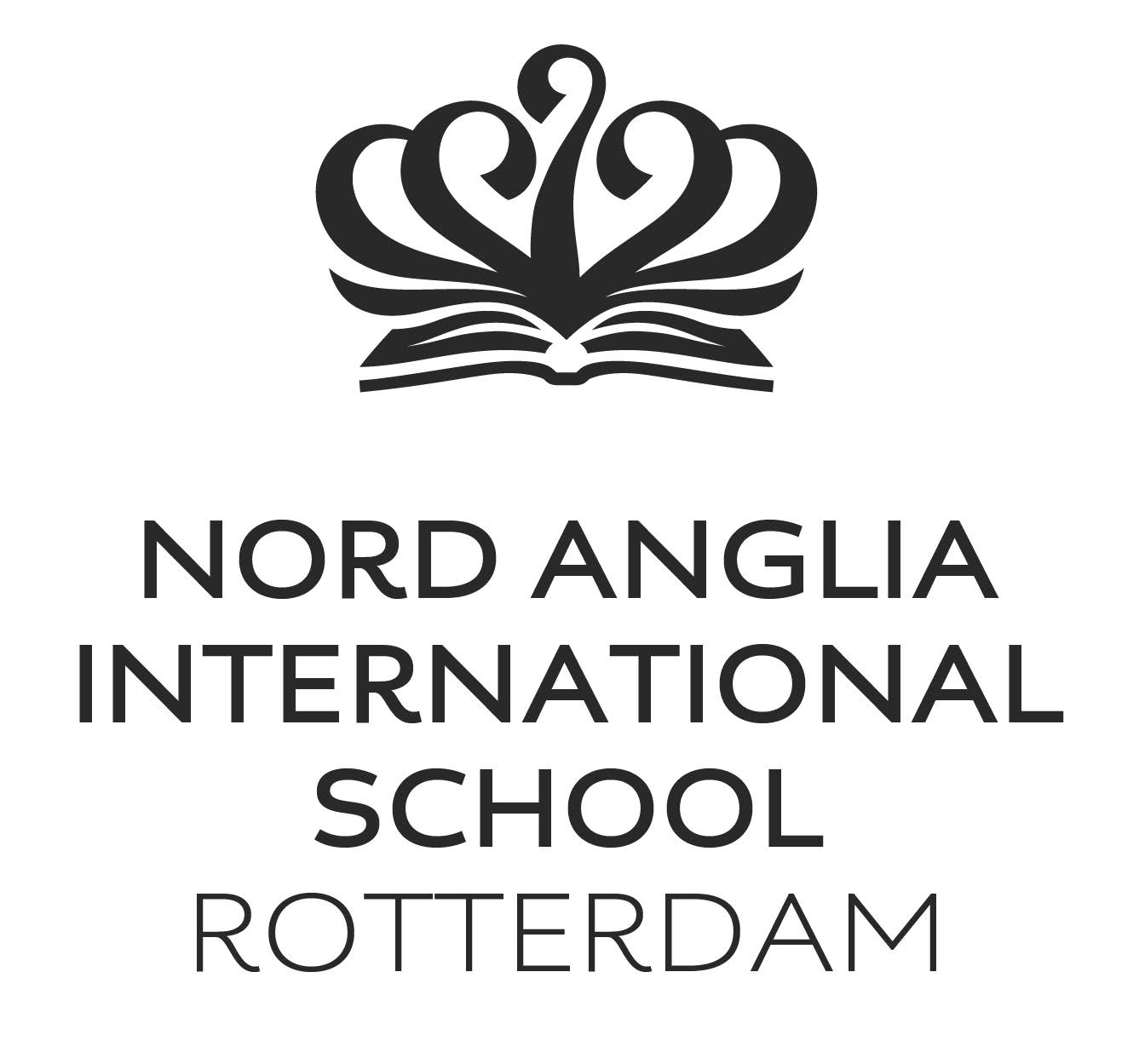

Location
- Rotterdam; Netherlands; 51.9637°N 4.5028°E

Information
- Former name: American International School of Rotterdam
- Type: Private school, International school
- Established: 1959
- Director: Alison Lipp
- Faculty: Approx. 70
- Grades: Pre-K (3-year olds) through Grade 12
- Enrollment: 260
- Athletics: Softball, Basketball, Swimming, Track and Field, Volleyball, Soccer
- Mascot: The Shark
- Arts: Music, Theater, Photography, Visual arts
- Nationalities: 40+
- Languages taught: 5
- Website: Nord Anglia International School Rotterdam

Nord Anglia International School Rotterdam (NAISR), formerly the American International School of Rotterdam, is an international school in Hillegersberg, Netherlands, an area of Rotterdam. The school educates students from 3 to 18 years of age and has three academic areas: Early Years, Primary School and Secondary School.

== History ==
NAISR (previously American International School of Rotterdam) was founded in 1959 to educate the post-war growth of American families brought to the area by the U.S. military and international business. Over the following fifty years, the military presence in the area declined and the school has focused on becoming a more internationally minded school catering for a much more culturally-diverse population. It was acquired by Nord Anglia Education in 2018.

== Student Profile and Faculty ==
The school maintains an average class size of 17 students and a teacher-to-student ratio of 1:7. The faculty comprises international educators with an average teacher retention rate of 7 years. The student body represents over 40 nationalities, and the school provides integrated English as an Additional Language (EAL) support for students in Years 1–11.

== Accreditation ==
NAISR is a member of the Northwest European Council of International Schools (NECIS) and is fully accredited by the New England Association of Schools and Colleges (NEASC) and the Council of International Schools (CIS). NAISR is also an IB World School.

== STEAM ==
The school features a dedicated STEAM Maker Space developed in partnership with the Massachusetts Institute of Technology (MIT). The facility serves as an educational hub for primary and secondary students, integrating science, technology, engineering, arts, and mathematics through hands-on coursework.

== The Arts ==
In October 2026, the school inaugurated the Albert Dolmans Art Academy, funded by a bequest from the Gordon Scholarship Fund. Named after the Dutch-American painter, the facility features specialized studios, ceramics equipment, and expanded coursework for IBDP Visual Arts students.

The Juilliard School in 2015 created technical training programs with Nord Anglia Education for students who wish to advance their skill-based learning in the performing arts.

== Sports ==
The school features a variety of indoor and outdoor athletic spaces on its campus, including a newly renovated multi-purpose sports hall, a weight room, and three age-appropriate playgrounds. The campus outdoor layout includes full-size all-weather pitches. Additionally, the school has expanded its athletic curriculum by utilizing municipal spaces nearby, including local swimming pools for student aquatic programs. The school participates in and hosts regional inter-scholastic sports and academic competitions.

== Extracurricular Activities and Global Partnerships ==
As part of the Nord Anglia Education network, NAISR participates in several global educational programs:

- MIT Collaboration: Students participate in STEAM workshops and annual student visits to the Massachusetts Institute of Technology (MIT) in Boston.
- Model United Nations: Secondary students ("NAISR Sharks") represent the school at international conferences, including the annual The Hague International Model United Nations (THIMUN) conference.

== Campus and Services ==
The NAISR campus features dedicated learning support facilities, a school cafeteria, sports center and location-based student transportation services covering the greater Rotterdam area. The campus also hosts an integrated provider that offers after-school and holiday childcare services for younger students.

== See also ==
- Stichting William K. Gordon Scholarship Fund
- Funtazia International Child Care
- Hillegersberg Neighborhood
