= Longjumeau Party School =

Bolshevik party school

The Party School of the Russian Social Democratic Labour in Longjumeau (Russian: Партийная школа РСДРП в Лонжюмо) was the first official party school of the Bolshevik faction of the RSDLP which was established to educate and train future party cadres. It was situated in Longjumeau, some 20 km south of Paris, France.

It was created in the Spring of 1911 in opposition to the Capri Party School which was run by the Vpered faction.

The head master of the school was Vladimir Lenin. Among the prominent lecturers were Nikolai Semashko, Inessa Armand, Yuri Steklov, Grigoriy Zinoviev, Lev Kamenev, David Ryazanov, Charles Rappoport and later Anatoly Lunacharsky.

Throughout the existence of the school, it had thirteen students (of them one woman) and five volunteers. Among the notable students were Grigory Ordzhonikidze, Vasily Mantsev, Yakov Zevin, Alexander Dogadov, and Eduard Prukhnyak. The students were elected by local party committees in the Russian Empire, approved by the School Committee of the party and were sent to France.

However, the Tsarist secret police, the Okhrana was able to infiltrate the school. After the completion of classes in the 17th of August, 1911, the school was officially closed and the students were sent back to Russia to conduct their underground party activities.
