= Stichting William K. Gordon Scholarship Fund =

- Stichting William K. Gordon Scholarship Fund
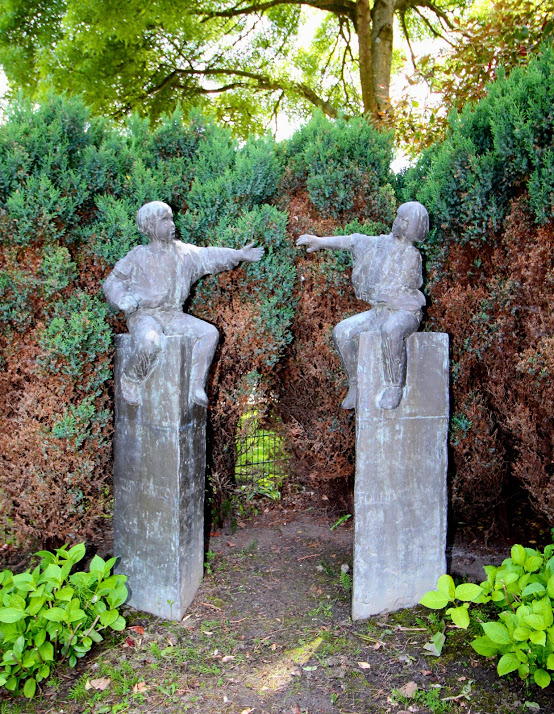
- "Reaching Out" sculpture was dedicated to the American International School in Rotterdam by Patricia Erickson and Sheila Gazaleh representing the Scholarship fund.
- Founded at: 1974
- Headquarters: Rotterdam, The Netherlands

The William K. Gordon Scholarship Fund is a Dutch Foundation set up in the early 1970s to promote international education in Rotterdam, the Netherlands.

== Background ==
The William K. Gordon Scholarship Fund became an official Foundation (Stichting) on 1 February 1974, to provide a public service to the members of the international community living and working in the Rotterdam area. The purpose of the Scholarship Fund is to promote international education by means of scholarships or loans to be made available to, or on behalf of students at the American International School of Rotterdam (AISR). AISR became Nord Anglia International School Rotterdam in 2019.

Among the many deserving students assisted through the years, in 2017 the fund supported the application of a gifted child of a refugee family. Funds for the Foundation have been drawn from donations from international companies and corporations together with the proceeds of the sale of seven editions of the best-selling English-language guide books to the Netherlands.

In October 2026, the school officially inaugurated the Albert Dolmans Art Academy on its campus, a dedicated facility for visual arts education built through a final bequest from the Gordon Scholarship Fund. Named in honour of the Dutch-American painter Albert Dolmans (1928–2021), the academy was established to support local creative education and features specialized studio spaces, professional ceramics equipment, and an expanded curriculum tailored for students pursuing the International Baccalaureate Diploma Programme in Visual Arts.

== Gallery ==
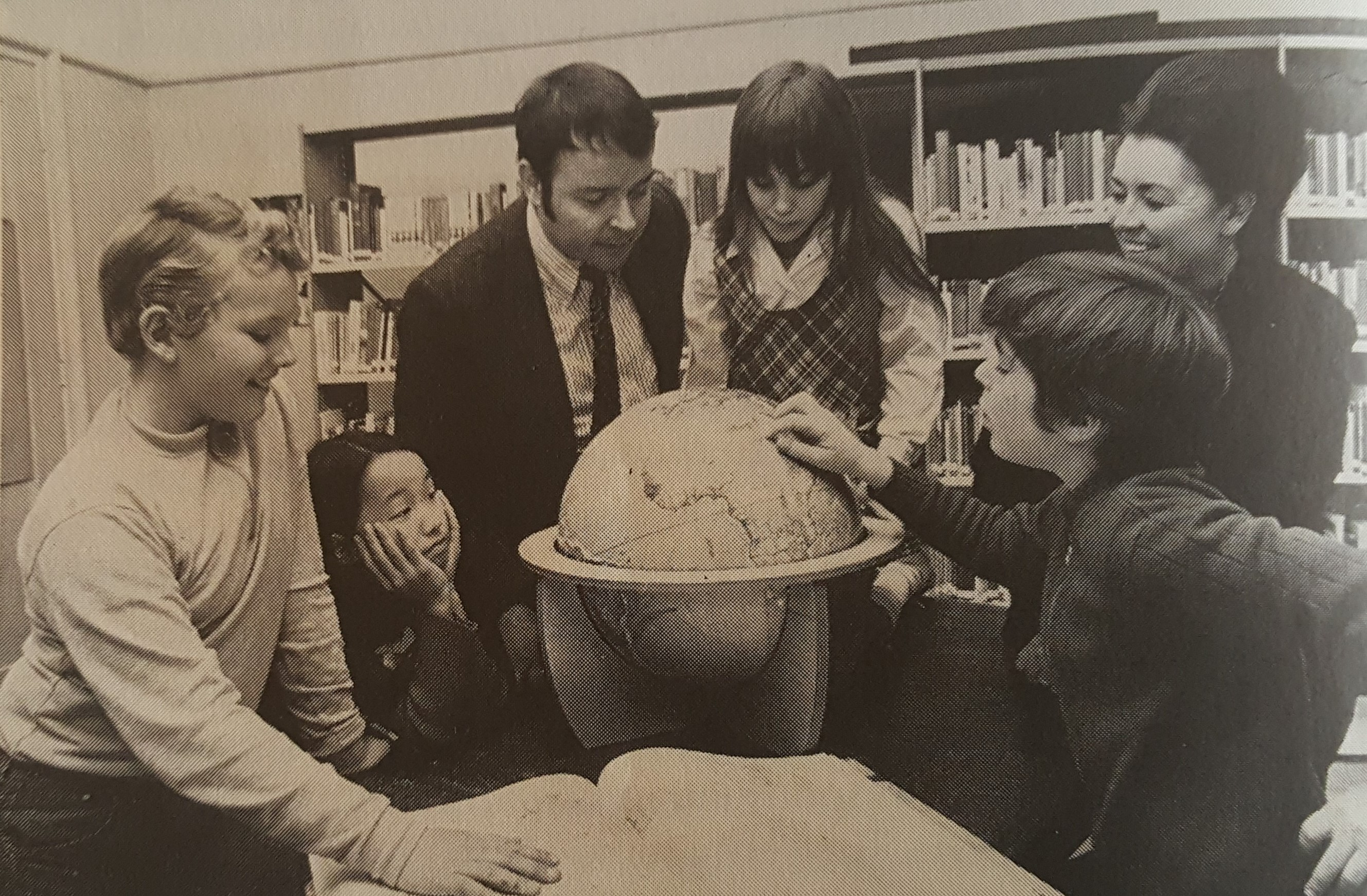
At American International School in Rotterdam in 1973 with Mr Antony Vadala (Principal), Mrs Patricia G Erickson (William K. Gordon Scholarship Fund) and students of the school

Roaming Round Rotterdam Guidebook Cover in 1973

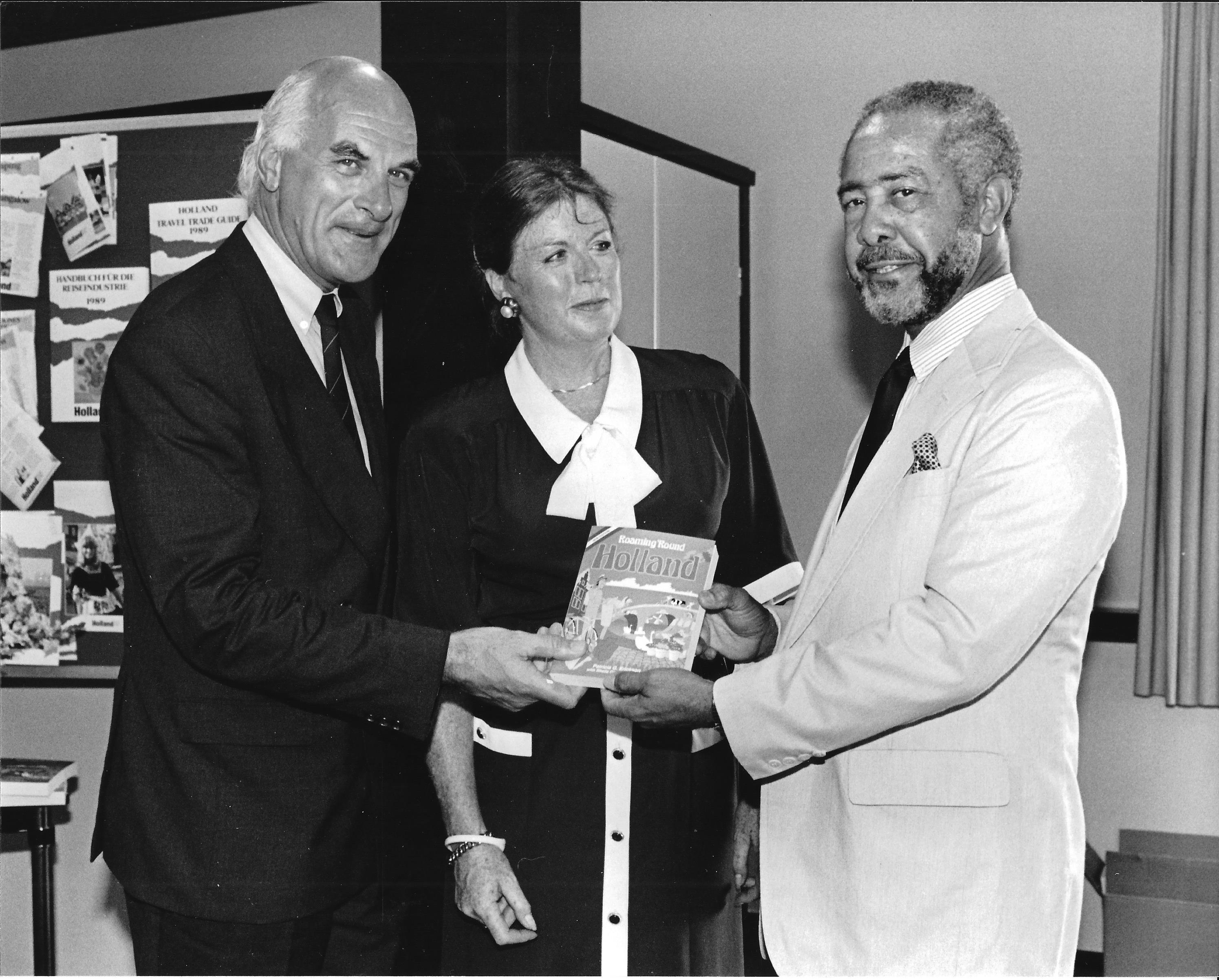
Launch Roaming ‘round Holland at City Hall, Rotterdam in 1989 with Sheila Gazaleh – Publisher, Hans Cornelisse – Directeur, Dutch Tourism Board, Jake M Dyels Jr – US Consul General

Roaming Round Holland Guidebook Cover in 1993

Sheila Gazaleh presents book to Bram Peper, (right) Mayor of Rotterdam, and British Ambassador, John W.D. Margetson in 1985

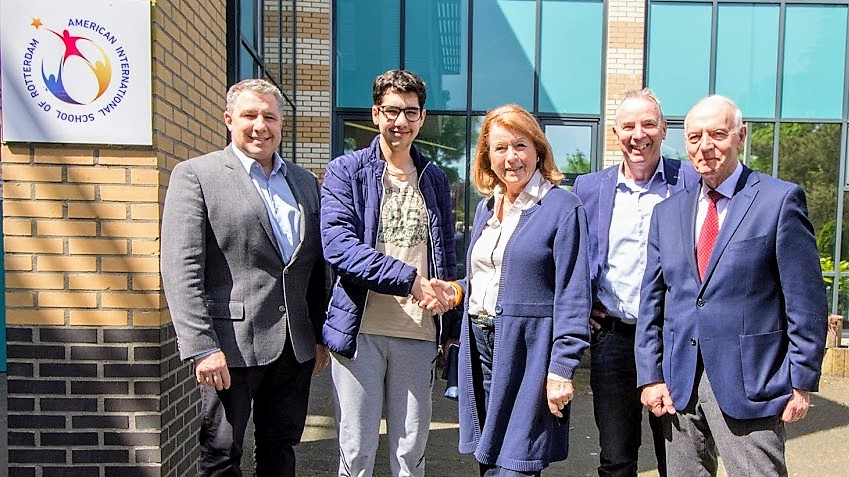
W.K. Gordon Scholarship Fund Board in 2017, Neal Dilk, Director; Muwaffak Aburshaid, scholarship student; Sheila Gazaleh, Board Chair; Willem Horbach, CFO; Fred Böttcher, Former Vice Chairman SNS Bank.

Here's Holland Guidebook Cover in 2007

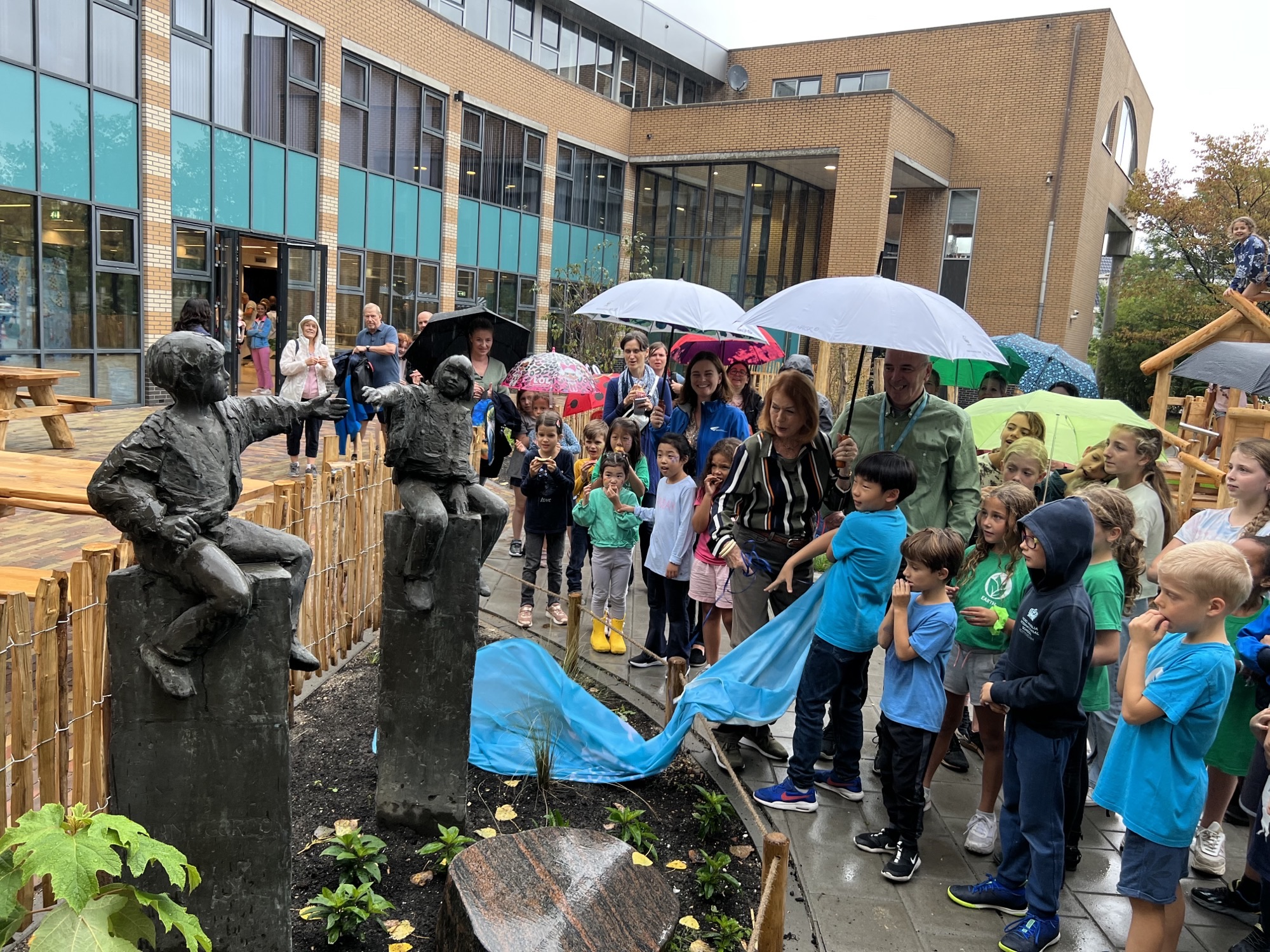
Trustees and school children rededicate Reaching Out statues by Carla Rutgers at Nord Anglia International School Rotterdam in the summer of 2022

Opening of the Albert Dolmans Art Academy in October 2026
