= Aleksandra Artyukhina =

Russian revolutionary (1889–1969)

- Александра Артюхина
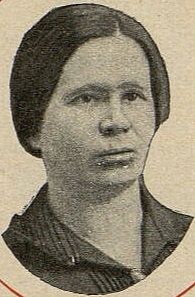
- Artyukhina in 1917

Head of the Workers and Peasants Department of the Central Committee
- In office 1925–1930
- Preceded by: Klavdiya Nikolayeva
- Succeeded by: Post abolished

Candidate member of the 14th, 15th Secretariat
- In office 1 January 1926 – 13 July 1930

Member of the 14th, 15th Orgburo
- In office 1 January 1926 – 13 July 1930

Personal details
- Born: 6 November 1889 Vyshny Volochyok, Russian Empire
- Died: 7 April 1969 (79 years) Moscow, Russian SFSR, Soviet Union
- Party: RSDLP (Bolsheviks) (1909–1918); Russian Communist Party (1918–1938)

Alexandra Vasilevna Artyukhina (Russian: Александра Васильевна Артюхина; 6 November 1889 – 7 April 1969) was an early Russian Bolshevik and revolutionary. She was the third woman elected to the Bolshevik Secretariat (15th term), serving as a Candidate Member.

== Life and career ==
The child of textile workers, Artyukhina was born at Vyshny Volochyok. She became a dressmaker's apprentice at age ten and a mill worker by 17. She joined the Communist labor movement in Russia, and was forced into exile at age 20 - probably in 1909. After three years, she returned to Russia and resumed her work, both in textiles and in union organizing.

She was active during the Revolution and rose through the ranks to sit as an alternate member on the Secretariat of the CPSU Central Committee from 1926 to 1930. She was also the last head of Zhenotdel. On March 1, 1931, international journalists noticed Artukhina as the first woman to sit on the Soviet Supreme Court.

She assumed leadership of the Cotton Textile Workers Union when a Commissar of light industry, Isadore Lubimoff, was removed. A collective farm was named for her.

Her industry fell 11% short of its production goal for the first quarter of 1938. After this, she was dismissed from that post and started directing various textile factories in Moscow until her retirement in 1951.

She was named a Hero of Socialist Labor in 1960, to commemorate the 50th anniversary of International Women's Day, and lies buried in the Novodevichy Cemetery.

== Honours and awards ==
- Hero of Socialist Labour (7 March 1960)
- Three Orders of Lenin

== Bibliography ==
- Scheide, Carmen: "'Born in October': The Life and Thought of Aleksandra Vasilevna Artyukhina, 1889−1969", in: Ilic, Melanie: Women in the Stalin Era, Houndmills 2001, pages 9-28.
