= Andrei Bubnov =

Russian revolutionary leader (1883–1938)

- Андрей Бубнов
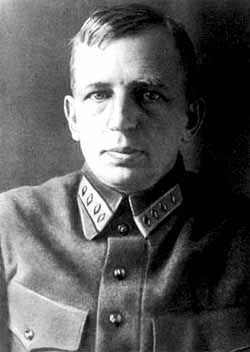
- Bubnov in 1920

People's Commissar for Education
- In office 12 September 1929 – 26 October 1937
- Premier: Alexei Rykov; Vyacheslav Molotov
- Preceded by: Anatoly Lunacharsky
- Succeeded by: Pyotr Tyurkin

Head of the Political Directorate of the Workers' and Peasants' Red Army
- In office 17 January 1924 – 1 October 1929
- President: Mikhail Frunze; Kliment Voroshilov
- Preceded by: Vladimir Antonov-Ovseyenko
- Succeeded by: Yan Gamarnik

Head of Military-Revolutionary Committee of the Ukrainian Soviet Socialist Republic
- In office 12 July – 18 September 1918
- Preceded by: Volodymyr Zatonsky
- Succeeded by: Fyodor Sergeyev

Member of the 6th Politburo
- In office 10 October – 29 November 1917

Full member of the 13th Secretariat
- In office 30 April – 31 December 1925

Candidate member of the 14th, 15th Secretariat
- In office 1 January 1926 – 13 July 1930

Full member of the 13th, 14th, 15th, 16th Orgburo
- In office 2 June 1924 – 10 February 1934

Personal details
- Born: April 3, 1883 Ivanovo-Voznesensk, Russia
- Died: 1 August 1938 (aged 55) Kommunarka, Moscow Oblast, Soviet Union
- Party: RSDLP (Bolsheviks) (1903–1918); Russian Communist Party (1918–1937)
- Education: Moscow Agricultural Institute
- Occupation: revolutionary, politician, Communist ideologist

Andrei Sergeyevich Bubnov (Russian: Андрей Сергеевич Бубнов; 3 April [O.S. 22 March] 1883 – 1 August 1938) (Note: Formerly, officially said to have died on 12 January 1940) was a Russian Bolshevik revolutionary leader, Soviet politician and military leader, member of the Left Opposition, and an important Bolshevik figure in Ukraine.

== Life ==
=== Early career ===
Bubnov was born in Ivanovo-Voznesensk in Vladimir Governorate (now Ivanovo, Ivanovo Oblast, Russia) into a local Russian merchant's family. He studied at the Moscow Agricultural Institute, where he was involved in revolutionary circles beginning in 1900. He failed to graduate from the institute. In 1903, he joined the Bolshevik wing of the Russian Social Democratic Labour Party (RSDLP). In summer 1905, he joined the regional party committee of Ivanono-Voznesensk, and was their delegate to the 4th (1906) and 5th (1907) Party Conferences in Stockholm and London. Between 1907 and 1908, he was a member of the RSDLP's Moscow committee, and of the Bolshevik committee for the Central Industrial Region. He was arrested in 1908. In his autobiography, he stated that he was arrested 13 times during his revolutionary career, and spent four years imprisoned for his political activities.

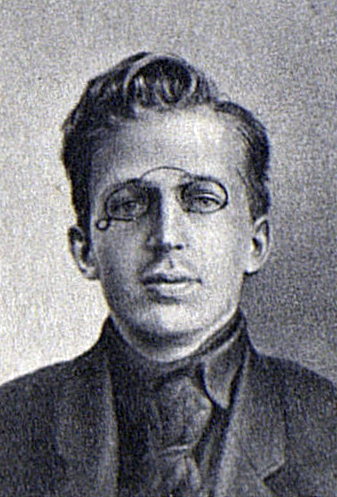
Bubnov in 1906

On his release from prison in 1909 Bubnov was made an agent of the Central Committee in Moscow. He was arrested again in 1910, and interned in a fortress. After his release in 1911, he was sent to organize workers in Nizhny Novgorod. From there, he was one of the organisers of the Prague Conference of January 1912, the first that excluded all RSDLP members who were not Bolsheviks. He was under arrest at the time of the conference, but in his absence was elected a candidate member of the first all-Bolshevik Central Committee. Afterwards he was sent to St Petersburg to assist in the launch of Pravda, and to work with the Bolshevik faction in the Fourth Duma. Arrested yet again, he was deported to Kharkov.

=== In the Russian Revolution and Civil War ===
On the outbreak of the First World War Bubnov became involved in the anti-war movement in Kharkiv, whence he had been deported after being expelled from St Petersburg. Arrested in August 1914, he was deported to Poltava. He moved to Samara, where he was arrested in October 1916, and exiled to Siberia in February 1917, but while he was in transit, he heard news of the February Revolution, and made his way back to Moscow.

In Moscow, Bubnov was elected to the Moscow Soviet and, at the 6th Party Conference in July 1917, he was elected to the Bolshevik central committee, which would later become the Central Committee of the Communist Party of the Soviet Union. In August, he moved to Petrograd, where he was a central figure during the October Revolution. On 23 October, two weeks before the revolution, the Central Committee appointed a seven-man political council consisting of Lenin, Zinoviev, Kamenev, Trotsky, Stalin, Sokolnikov and Bubnov. This is sometimes regarded as the first Politburo, but Trotsky's recollection was that this group was "completely impractical", since Lenin and Zinoviev were in hiding, and Zinoviev and Kamenev opposed the planned revolution, and "never once assembled." Bubnov's real importance was as a member of the Military Revolutionary Committee. "It was this body rather than the party 'politburo' which made the military preparations for the revolution." Together, they directed the inner-workings of would become known as the October Revolution. His role was to supervise the seizure of the postal and telegraph systems. After the successful execution of the October Revolution, he was appointed Commissar for Railways, before being sent to Rostov-on-Don to organise resistance to the newly formed White Army of General Kaledin.

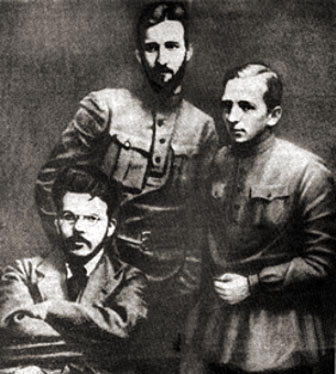
Members of the Ukrainian Military Revolutionary Committee, Volodymyr Zatonsky, Yuriy Kotsyubynsky, Andrei Bubnov, 1918

Bubnov clashed with Lenin for the first time when he opposed the decision to sign the Treaty of Brest-Litovsk that ended the war with Germany. For the next four years, Bubnov was prominent in the left wing opposition to Lenin. He was dropped from the Central Committee in March 1918, but reinstated as a candidate member a year later. In February 1918, he joined the Left Communists, and moved to Ukraine, to organise partisan detachments in the 'neutral zone' east of the German front line. He and Georgy Pyatakov, who led the left in the Ukrainian party, argued that Ukraine was not a signatory to the Brest-Litovsk Treaty, and that they were therefore entitled to organise partisan war against the Germans.

In October 1918, Bubnov moved to Kyiv, which was ruled by Hetman Skoropadskiy, with German backing, and later by the Ukrainian nationalist Symon Petliura. Bubnov acted as the chairman of the clandestine Kyiv soviet, retaining that position after the Red Army had taken Kyiv. During the Russian Civil War, he was a political commissar with the Red Army, fighting on the Ukrainian Front. During the Ninth Party Congress in Moscow, in March 1920, he accused the central party leadership of wrecking the party organisation in Ukraine by removing oppositionists, and threatening the stability of the Ukraine government by alienating peasant farmers. He was again removed from the Central Committee and, soon afterwards, he was recalled to Moscow to take charge of the textile industry. At the next party congress, in March 1921, he acted as a spokesman for the "Democratic Centralists", who demanded less centralised control of the communist party, but on hearing of the outbreak of the Kronstadt rebellion, rushed north to take part in suppressing, for which he was awarded the Order of the Red Banner.

In 1921–22, Bubnov was posted in the North Caucasus. In 1922, he was appointed head of the Agitprop department of the Central Committee, which meant he was working alongside Stalin, the new General Secretary.

=== In the Soviet Union ===
Bubnov's last act as an oppositionist was to sign the Declaration of 46 in October 1923, which was a call for greater party democracy. The Declaration was organised and penned by future members of the Left Opposition, who supported Trotsky in the power struggle that followed Lenin's death. In January 1924, while Lenin was incapacitated by a stroke, the head of the Workers' and Peasants' Red Army's Political Directorate, Vladimir Antonov-Ovseenko, an ardent Trotsky supporter, was sacked. Bubnov was appointed in his place, despite his past as a left oppositionist. From then on, he was a reliable supporter of Stalin. In May 1924, he was restored to full membership of the Central Committee, which he retained until his arrest. In April–December 1925, he was the Secretary of the Central Committee, and after that in January 1926–June 1930, he was a candidate member of the Secretariat of the Central Committee. In 1924–29, he was a member of the Orgburo.

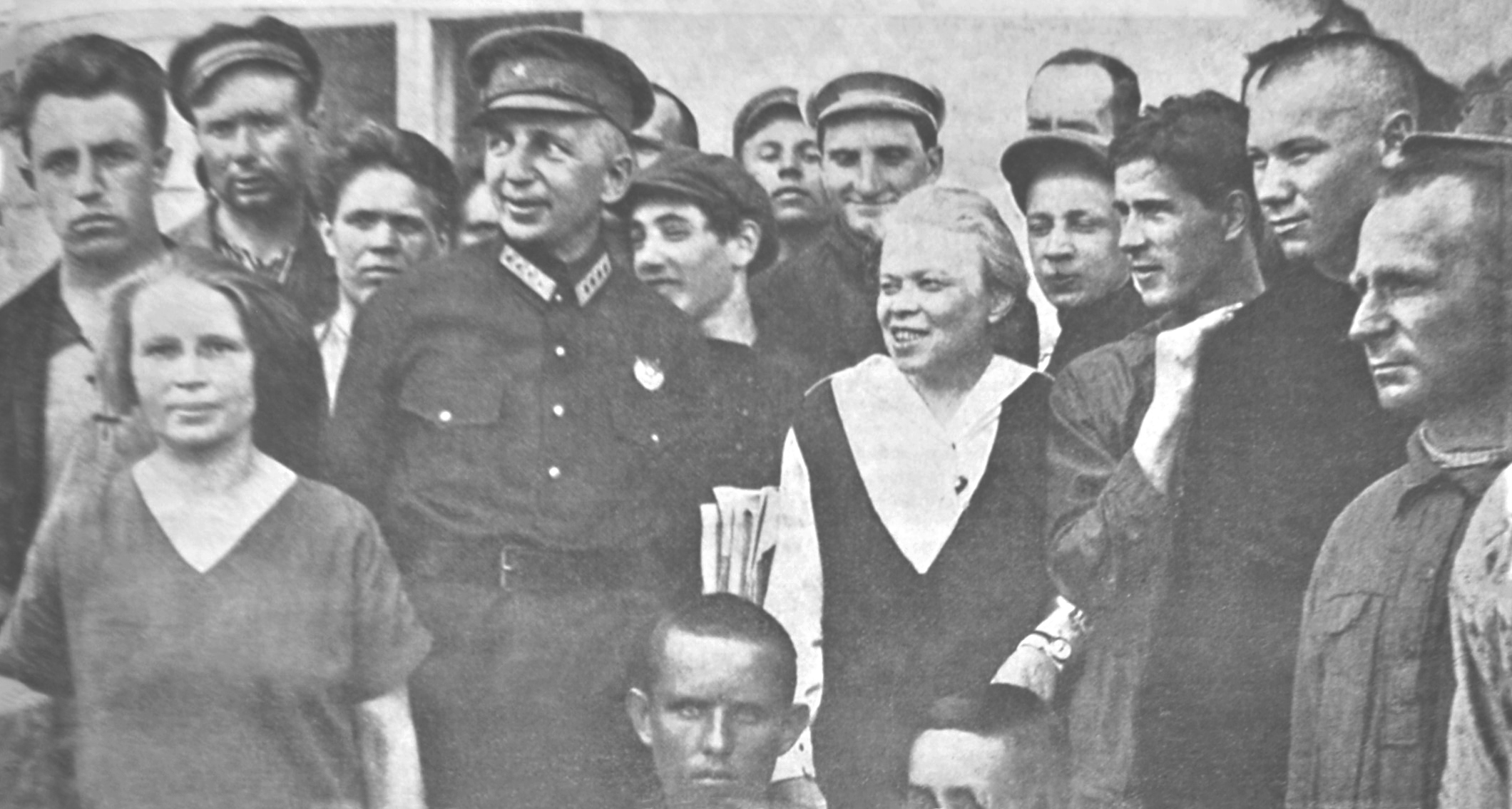
Andrei Bubnov (military uniform) and Maria Ulyanova at the meeting of the workers and peasants news correspondents, 1926.

Early in 1926, Bubnov was appointed head of a Soviet delegation to China, to investigate what seemed to be a breakdown in relations with the Chinese military authorities. He travelled under the name Ivanovsky, taking extraordinary precautions to hide his identity. Following the Canton Coup on 20 March 1926, he worked out an agreement with the new Nationalist leader Chiang Kai-shek. He then worked with Grigori Voitinsky and Fedor Raskolnikov on the "Preliminary Theses on the Situation in China", which was presented to the ECCI in November and December of that year.

In 1929, he replaced Lunacharsky as People's Commissar for Education, staying in this role till his arrest in October 1937. As Commissar for Education, he ended the period of progressive, experimental educational practices and switched the emphasis to training in practical industrial skills. It was in this capacity that he attended the First All-Russian Museum Congress held in Moscow in December 1930.

== Arrest and death ==
In October 1937, during the Great Purge, Bubnov arrived at the Kremlin for a meeting of the Central Committee, but was barred by the guards from entering. Frightened, he went back to the Commissariat for Education, and heard on the radio that evening that he had been removed from his post of People's Commissar. He was arrested by the NKVD a few days later, on 17 October 1937. He was then still a member of the Central Committee, which convened on 4 December, and received a message from Stalin saying that Bubnov had confessed to being 'an enemy of the people' and a German spy. He was expelled from the Party Central Committee.

Though the charges were false, Bubnov did confess quite quickly and probably under torture. In fact, he became so co-operative that the NKVD put him in the same cell as Pavel Postyshev, who was refusing to incriminate himself, in the hope that Bubnov would help break his resolve. On 26 July, Bubnov's name was included in a death list of 138 individuals submitted to Stalin, who ordered them all to be shot. After a 20-minute trial on 1 August 1938, he was sentenced to death, and shot the same day.

The modus operandi of the Soviet regime was often to keep secret the fate of particular purged persons: whether they were sent to internal exile to a labor camp, sent to a psychiatric hospital (in which the regime disguised confinement and drugging as compassionate "health care"), or executed. This policy encouraged their families and the general public to believe that they were probably still alive in a camp or hospital somewhere.

Bubnov was posthumously rehabilitated in March 1956 during the de-Stalinization of the Khrushchev thaw. The Soviet government did not make public the lists of the purged persons who had already long been executed. Thus, their relatives were often still searching for them in various psychiatric hospitals in the 1970s, as was the case with Bubnov.

== Works ==
- Osnovnye momente v razvitii kommunisticheskoi partii v Rossii [Key Moments in the Development of the Communist Party in Russia]. Moscow: Gosizdat, 1921.
- Osnovnye voprosy istorii RKP [Key Questions in the History of the RKP]. Moscow: Gosizdat, 1924. [https://archive.org/details/bubnovasosnovnyevoprosyistoriirkp2e67 (Revised second edition, 1925).
- Uroki Oktiabria i Trotskizm [Lessons of October and Trotskyism]. Moscow: Krasnaia zvezda, 1925.
- 1924 god v voennom stroitel'stve [The Year 1924 in Military Construction]. Moscow: Voennoe izdatel'stvo, 1925.
- Partiia i oppozitsiia 1925 goda [The Party and the Opposition of 1925]. Moscow: Voennyi vestnik, 1926.
- Grazhdansakaia voina, partiia, i voennoe delo [Civil War, the Party, and Military Affairs]. Moscow: Voennyi vestnik, 1928.

== See also ==
- Outline of the Russian Revolution and Civil War
- Bibliography of the Russian Revolution and Civil War
- Bibliography of Stalinism and the Soviet Union
- Index of Old Bolsheviks
- Index of articles related to the Russian Revolution and Civil War
