= Karl Baumann =

American artist

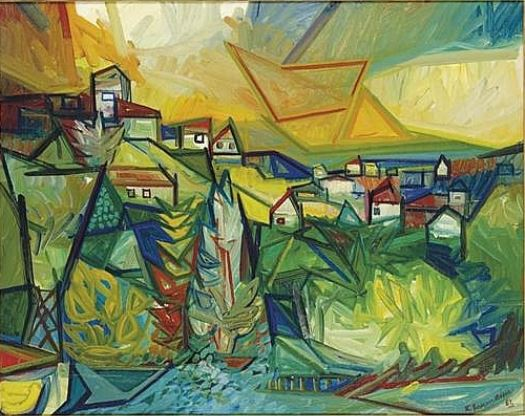
Photograph of "Village Scene" signed and dated 'K. Baumann 62' (lower right)

Karl Herman Baumann (December 26, 1911 – January 30, 1984) was an American artist of German origin. Baumann was a leading California Abstract Expressionist, a noted professor of painting at the California College of the Arts and teacher at the San Francisco Museum of Modern Art.

== Life ==
Karl Baumann was an American painter, commercial artist, printmaker and noted teacher. He was born in 1911 in Leipzig, Germany. His father, Willie Baumann, came from a family of wealth, while his mother, Augusta Baumann, came from a poorer background. Before World War I broke out, Willie took his family to America and settled in New York, hoping to find a better life for his wife and son. They eventually separated and Willie moved to San Francisco to work for Schmidt Lithograph Karl stayed with his mother, who worked by making postcards and toy soldiers. Augusta would eventually contract lead poisoning and die due to tuberculosis in 1916. Karl spent the rest of his childhood with his maternal grandparents and it was there that he got his inspiration to do art from his grandfather.

Karl started to draw when he was five years old with no formal training. He would often draw with colored pencils and would initially draw pictures of soldiers before becoming more invested in plants and animals. In his childhood, he would take walks with his grandfather, which brought out his love for nature. During these walks, he would often pick up and collect rocks and wood, as well as learn the name of trees. Eventually, later in his life, his studio was filled with objects relating to nature such as aquariums, plants, rocks, woods and sea shells he collected while walking through the beach and Golden Gate Park.

After the war, In 1929, Karl would eventually be reunited with his father Willie, who had saved enough money to send for Karl. They had limited contact between each other due to Willie's illness. Karl would join his father at the Schmidt Lithograph and work there. Five years later, Karl would marry a woman called Naomi Pratt and would eventually have a son named Nicholas. Karl was eventually fired from his job due to his pro-union beliefs, which left him the chance to pursue his most important option in his career; to work for the WPA as an easel painter. In 1936 the WPA employed Karl Baumann as an easel painter. Due to his environment which consisted of being surrounded by artists, Baumann invested all of his energy to his paintings and began to explore nature more. Baumann began to change his painting style as well. In 1940, Baumann won a competition in the U.S. Maritime Commission for one of his art panels. He exhibited his works at the Golden Gate International Exposition, the Palace of the Legion of Honor, the San Francisco Museum of Modern Art, and the Metropolitan Museum of Art in New York City. He began to gain a reputation as a leading Californian Abstract Expressionist. Near the late 1940s, Baumann became highly respected in the Bay Area, specifically in the art community. He was hired in 1947 by the California College of the Arts and Crafts as a professor of painting, and also taught for a time at the San Francisco Museum of Modern Art. Baumann was somewhat neutral about his impact on his students despite many of his students being influenced by him and some were inspired. It is noted that Baumann's early works are in the style of German Expressionists, before his later works became more abstract.

On the 7th of February 1974, Baumann was diagnosed with lung cancer and had six months to live. When Baumann was administered cobalt, it made very sick and weakened him greatly. in response to this, Baumann painted "Cobalt" in 1974. Two years later, Baumann incredibly showed no signs or forms of cancer. He continued to produce a few more paintings after 1974 had passed. Unfortunately, in 1976, Nicholas was murdered in San Francisco. This had a severe negative impact on Baumann, enough to the point where he could no longer find the urge to paint. Karl Baumann died in 1984 due to a heart attack and his estate is now handled by Maxwell Galleries of San Francisco.

== Works ==
In 1938 to 1941, Baumann often painted only in watercolor. He usually painted subjects such as landscapes, cities, seascapes, themes of war, and still life as well. Karl had three prominent themes in his abstract art work: nature, humanities urge to separate themselves from nature, and the negative outcomes that happen as a result of said action. Baumann was interested in expanding the mind beyond the experience of just earth, in hopes that the realms of the universe could be explored as well. Karl often explored the theme of nature in his artwork and corresponded with his beliefs that so long as mankind lives in harmony with nature, nothing ill will befall them and said action will only happen if the respect for it is lost.

Karl's paintings during the late 1930s and early 1940s heavily represented his beliefs. The painting "Industry" done in 1938 and "Industry:San Francisco" done in 1939, shows nature being conquered by technology and its advancement. The trees are replaced with buildings, hills are used to make railroads and factories and as a result, destroyed. His other paintings, both of which are untitled and simply called "Railroad" and " Crucifixion" further depict this theme of the destruction of nature. In the "Railroad" painting made in 1939, it shows only patches of green land as the rest had been destroyed by railroad tracks, cables, the rubble of buildings. In the painting known as " Crucifixion" created in 1941, it shows the "mother" of mankind, presumably mother nature on a cross, as bombers fly in the sky in the background. The paintings possibly reflect Baumann's idea that technology has brought humanity away from nature and has now brought them to a world where they cannot survive.
