= Alexei Medvedev (politician) =

Russian politician and Great Purge victim (1884–1937)

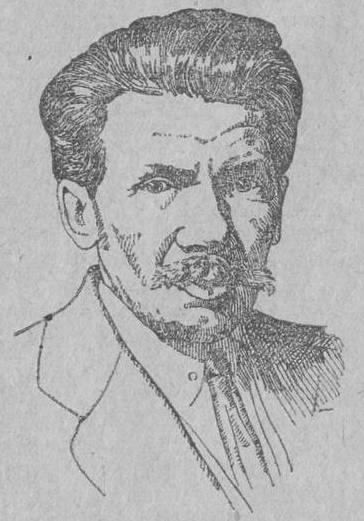

2nd Secretary of the Communist Party of Ukraine
- In office October 1927 – November 1929
- Preceded by: Ivan Klimenko
- Succeeded by: Lavrenty Kartvelishvili
- In office May 1924 – January 1925
- Preceded by: Dmitry Leved
- Succeeded by: Ivan Klimenko

Personal details
- Born: March 16, 1884 Sereno-Zavod, Kozelsky Uyezd, Kaluga Governorate, Russian Empire
- Died: October 30, 1937 (aged 53) Moscow, Russian Soviet Federative Socialist Republic, Soviet Union
- Party: RSDLP (Bolsheviks) (1904–1918); All-Union Communist Party (b) (1918–1937)
- Other political affiliations: Communist Party of Ukraine

Alexei Vasilievich Medvedev (Russian: Алексей Васильевич Медведев; 16 March 1884 – 30 October 1937) was a Soviet politician and trade union leader.

== Biography ==
Medvedev was born in to a Russian working-class family. He graduated from the village parish school and worked in a factory.

In 1904 he joined the Bolshevik faction of the RSDLP. He led underground revolutionaries and was arrested several and actively participated in the 1905 Russian Revolution.

In 1917 he was a member of the Petrograd Committee of the RSDLP(b) and was a participant in the October Revolution in Petrograd. From 1918 to 1920 he was the chairman of the Kozelsk district committee of the Russian Communist Party (b).

He was a participant in the Russian Civil War where he organized Red Guard units.

From 1921 he secretary of the Belotserkovsky (Kyiv province) county committee of the Communist Party (b) of Ukraine, then in political work in the Crimean Labour Army. In 1922-1923 he Chairman of the Kharkov Provincial Council of Trade Unions. In 1923-1924 he was Chairman of the Central Control Commission of the CP (b) of Ukraine and People's Commissar of the Workers' and Peasants' Inspection of the Ukrainian SSR.

From May 1924 to January 1925 he was 2nd Secretary of the Central Committee of the Communist Party (b) of Ukraine.

From January 1925 to September 1927, he was the responsible (first) secretary of the Yekaterinoslav (Dnipropetrovsk) provincial committee (from August 1925 - district committee) of the CP (b) of Ukraine. From October 1927 to November 1929 he was Secretary of the Central Committee of the Communist Party (b) of Ukraine.

Medvedev was a member of the Central Committee of the All-Union Communist Party from 1924 to 1930. From 1930 to 1934 he was a member of the Central Control Commission of the VKP (b) and from 1931 to 1934 he was a candidate member of the Presidium of the Central Control Commission.

From November 1929, Medvedev at the disposal of the Central Committee of the All-Union Communist Party (b). From December 1929 he was Secretary of the Union Council of the Central Executive Committee of the USSR.

From 1935 he was a member of the Supreme Court of the Soviet Union.

Medvedev was arrested on 20 August 1937 during the Great Purge. He was sentenced by the Military Collegium of the Supreme Court of the Soviet Union to death and was shot on 30 October 1937.

Alexei Medvedev was rehabilitated on 3 March 1956.
