= 15th Congress of the All-Union Communist Party (Bolsheviks) =

1927 meeting of Soviet delegates

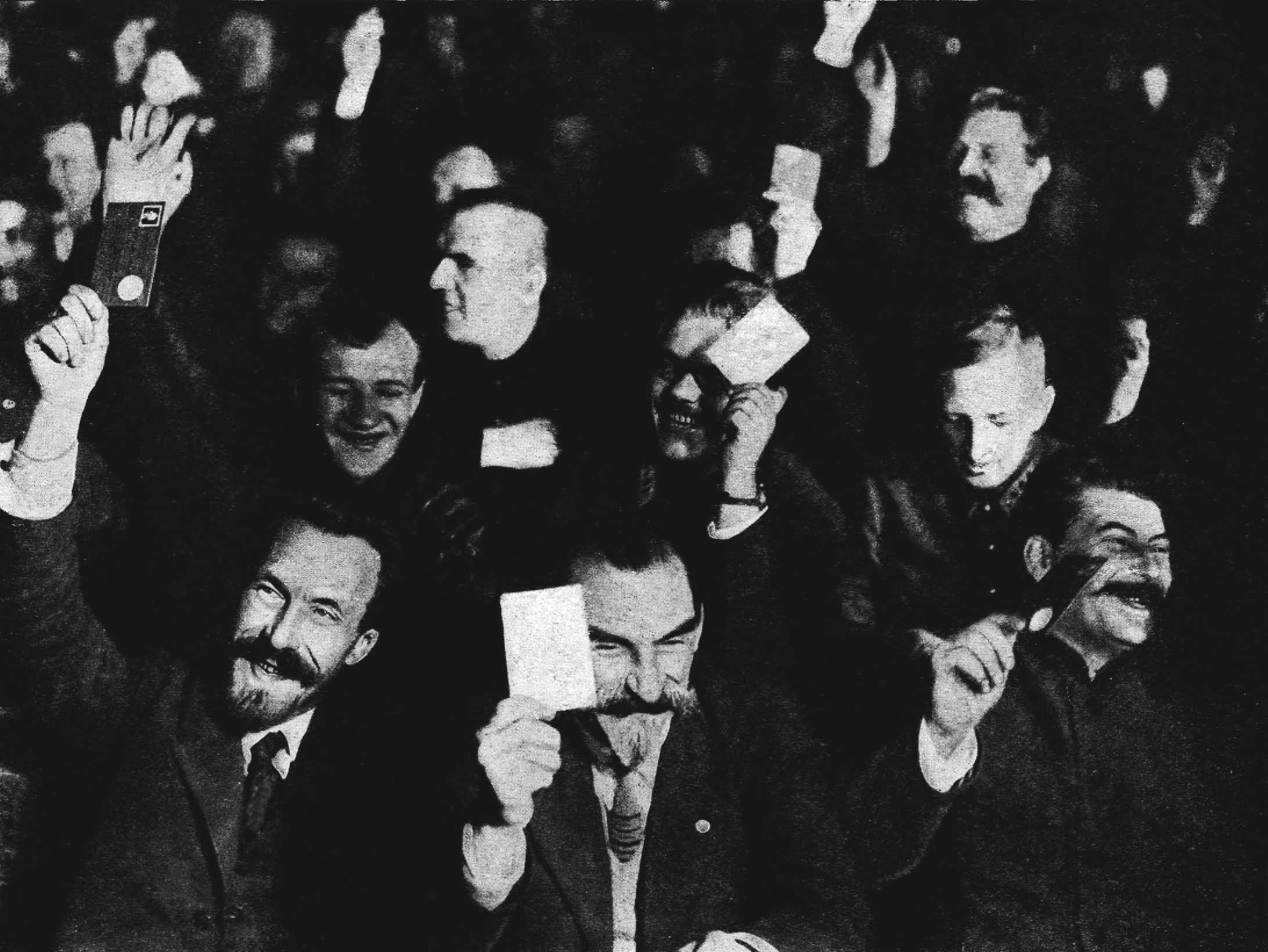
Front row: Rykov, Skrypnyk and Stalin voting

The 15th Congress of the All-Union Communist Party (Bolsheviks) was held during 2–19 December 1927 in Moscow. It was attended by 898 delegates with a casting vote and 771 with a consultative vote. The congress ended an inner-party struggle, as the United Opposition and other opponents of Joseph Stalin were expelled from the party.

== History ==
=== Background ===
In October 1927, the last Left Opposition and United Opposition members were expelled from the Central Committee elected by the 14th Congress, and in November 1927 Leon Trotsky and Grigory Zinoviev had been expelled from the Party itself. Lev Kamenev acted as the United Opposition's main spokesman at the 15th Congress due to Trotsky's and Zinoviev's expulsion.

=== Repudiation of the United Opposition ===
The 15th Congress of the All-Union Communist Party (Bolsheviks) was convened in Moscow on 2 December 1927. This marked the first Soviet Communist Party Congress in two years, this despite the fact that party regulations called for annual meetings. The gathering was retrospectively remembered as the "Congress of the Collectivization of Agriculture and of the Socialist Offensive on All Fronts" in the official party history of 1962, although a major part of time spent by the gathering related to internal party politics and the final ritualistic repudiation of the United Opposition of Trotsky, Zinoviev, and their supporters, effectively ending a two-year factional war.

Oppositionists Christian Rakovsky and Lev Kamenev held brief speeches in front of the Congress. Rakovsky's speech was interrupted fifty-seven times by his opponents, including Nikolai Bukharin, Martemyan Ryutin, and Lazar Kaganovich. Although, unlike Rakovsky, Kamenev used the occasion to appeal for reconciliation, he was nevertheless interrupted twenty-four times by the same group.

=== Theses on Industrialization ===
The Central Committee adopted a set of theses regarding industrialization which had been prepared in October 1927 by the Central Committee.

The Party stated:

In view of a possible military attack by capitalist states against the proletarian state, the Five-Year Plan should devote maximum attention to the fastest possible development of those sectors of the economy ... which play the main role in securing the country's defense and in providing economic stability in wartime.

Thereafter, Soviet planners increasingly emphasized defense-related industry.

=== Election of a new Central Committee ===
The 15th Congress elected a new Central Committee to govern activities of the Communist Party during the period in between Congresses.

Central Committee: 71 members, 50 candidates to Central Committee membership Central Revision Commission: 9 members Central Control Commission: 195 members
