= Semyon Lobov (politician) =

Soviet statesman and politician

- Семён Лобов

People's Commissar of Food of the RSFSR
- In office 2 October 1936 – 21 June 1937
- Prime Minister: Daniil Sulimov
- Preceded by: Position established
- Succeeded by: Alexei Badaev

People's Commissar of Forestry of the USSR
- In office 5 January 1932 – 1 October 1936
- Prime Minister: Vyacheslav Molotov
- Preceded by: Position established
- Succeeded by: Vladimir Ivanov

Chairman of the Supreme Soviet of National Economy of the RSFSR
- In office 3 February 1926 – 9 July 1930
- Preceded by: Pyotr Bogdanov
- Succeeded by: Konstantin Strievsky

Personal details
- Born: 27 November 1888 Smolensk Governorate, Russian Empire
- Died: 30 October 1937 (aged 47) Moscow, Russian SFSR, Soviet Union
- Party: RSDLP (Bolsheviks) (1913–1918); Russian Communist Party (Bolsheviks) (1918–1937)
- Awards: Order of Lenin; Order of the Red Banner

Semyon Semyonovich Lobov (Russian: Семён Семёнович Ло́бов; 1888 – 30 October 1937) was a Soviet statesman and politician.

== Biography ==
He was born in to the family of a forester. Lobov graduated from his elementary school and became a worker in various professions, including as a construction worker, draftsman and forester.

Lobov joined the Bolshevik faction of the Russian Social Democratic Labour Party in 1913. He worked in the Rosencrantz plant in Petrograd and after the October Revolution became a member of the Petrograd and Vyborg committees of the RSDLP (b). In the beginning of the Russian Civil War he joined the newly established Soviet secret police, the Cheka, and at first became the deputy head of the Petrograd Cheka and later in March 1919 its chairman. He was then appointed Chairman of Saratov Cheka and later in May 1920 he was appointed Chairman of the Cheka of the Bashkir ASSR.

After the Civil War he transferred to Petrograd and was appointed head of the fuel department of the USSR Oil Syndicate. In 1923 he became the chairman of the North-West Industrial Bureau of the Supreme Council of National Economy and was also a member of the Glavkoncesskom. He was then elected to the Presidium of the Supreme Council of National Economy in 1924 and then served as the Chairman of the Supreme Council of National Economy of the RSFSR from 1926 to 1930 and at the same time chairman of the Glavenergo (the Main Energy Directorate of the People's Commissariat of Heavy Industry).

Lobov was a member of the Central Committee of the All-Union Communist Party (b) from 1924 to 1934 as well as a member of the Orgburo from 1930 to 1934.

From 1932 to 1936 he was the People's Commissar of Timber Industry of the USSR and in the years 1936–1937 he was People's Commissar of Food of the RSFSR. In 1936 he received the Order of Lenin for the overfulfillment of the production the People's Commissariat of the Forestry Industry of the USSR and the successes achieved in organizing production and mastering its technology.

During the Great Purge he was arrested on the basis of the testimonies of Iosif Vareikis and was arrested on charges on being a participant of an "Anti-Soviet counter-revolutionary terrorist organization". He was sentenced to death on 30 October 1937 and shot on the same day.

Semyon Lobov was posthumously rehabilitated by Military Collegium of the Supreme Court of the Soviet Union in 1956. A street was named after him in Ugransky District in Smolensk.
