= Ivan Moskvin (politician) =

Soviet politician and Communist Party functionary

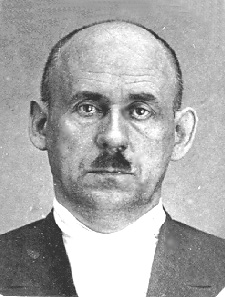
Photo of Ivan Moskvin after his arrest by the NKVD, 1937

Ivan Mikhailovich Moskvin (Russian: Иван Михайлович Москвин; 28 January 1890 – 27 November 1937) was a Soviet politician and Communist Party functionary.

== Biography ==
=== Early life and career ===
Moskvin was born into the family of an office worker. From December 1904 to 1909 he was a tutor in the city of Tver. In 1909 he graduated from the Tver Classical Gymnasium.

From 1909 to 1914 he was a student at the St. Petersburg Mining Institute and completed two and a half courses. Simultaneously from 1909 to 1914 he worked as a tutor in St. Petersburg.

Moskvin was a member of the Bolshevik faction of the RSDLP from 1911.

From 1912 to 1914 he was a member of the St. Petersburg Committee of the RSDLP. Before the First World War in 1914 he was a member of the Russian Bureau of the Central Committee of the RSDLP. From the summer of 1914 to the spring of 1916 he was a drawing technician at the Geological Committee in Petrograd. He was arrested several times during this period.

From the summer of 1916 to February 1917 he was a soil technician at the Geological Committee in Baku.

=== Party and state functionary ===
After the October Revolution he became chairman of Petrograd Railway District Committee of the RSDLP (b). From 1917 to 1919 he was a member of the Petrograd City Committee of the Russian Communist Party (b).

From 1918 to 1920 he was a member of the board, head of the accounting and distribution department of the Political Department of the Petrograd Military District, and head of the Petrograd branch of the Main Political Department of the People's Commissariat of Railways of the RSFSR.

From April to August 1921 he was head of the management department of the executive committee of the Petrograd Provincial Council. From October 1921 to May 1923 he was head of the organizational department and secretary of the Petrograd Provincial Committee of the RCP (B).

From May 1923 to March 1926 he was head of the organizational department of the North-Western Bureau of the RCP (b). Simultaneously from May 1923 to 1924 he was deputy secretary and from 1924 to March 1926, Secretary of the North-Western Bureau of the RCP (b) in Leningrad. During this period, Moskvin was a tutor and promoter of a young Nikolai Yezhov.

From March 25, 1926, to January 5, 1930, Moskvin head of the organizational and distribution department of the Central Committee of the All-Union Communist Party (b) and from January 5 to November 14, 1930, he was head of the department of distribution of administrative and economic and trade union personnel of the Central Committee of the VKP (b). Mosvkin was a participant in the party struggle against the Trotskyist-Zinoviev opposition in Leningrad alongside Ivan Kodatsky and Semyon Lobov.

From November 1930 to February 1932 he was chief of the personnel sector, deputy chairman of the Supreme Soviet of the National Economy of the Soviet Union, and head of the group for the promotion of technical knowledge. From February 1932 to March 1934 he was chief of the personnel sector, a member of the board of the People's Commissariat of Heavy Industry of the Soviet Union, and the head of a group for the promotion of technical knowledge.

From December 1927 he was a member of the Organizing Bureau of the Central Committee of the All-Union Communist Party (b) until January 1934 and a candidate member of the Secretariat of the Central Committee of the All-Union Communist Party (b) until October 1932.

From March 1934 to November 1935 he was a member of the Bureau and head of the machine-building group of the Soviet Control Commission under the USSR SNK. From November 1935 to June 1937 he was head of the heavy industry group of the Commission of Soviet Control at the USSR SNK.

=== Arrest and death ===
Despite originally being an ally of Joseph Stalin, on June 14, 1937, Moskvin was arrested by the NKVD in Moscow. He was sentenced to death by the Military Board of the Supreme Court of the USSR on November 27, 1937, and shot the same day. He was buried in the Don Cemetery in Moscow.

Ivan Moskvin was posthumously rehabilitated on July 11, 1956, and reinstated in the party in the same year.

== Family ==
His wife Sofya Aleksandrovna Dollar (1887–1938, in her first marriage she was married to Gleb Bokiy), from the family of Narodnaya Volya revolutionaries. They adopted a daughter, Oksana Ivanovna Bokiy (1916–1938), future wife of the writer Lev Razgon.
