= Alexander Dogadov =

Soviet trade unionist (1888–1937)

- Алекса́ндр Дога́дов
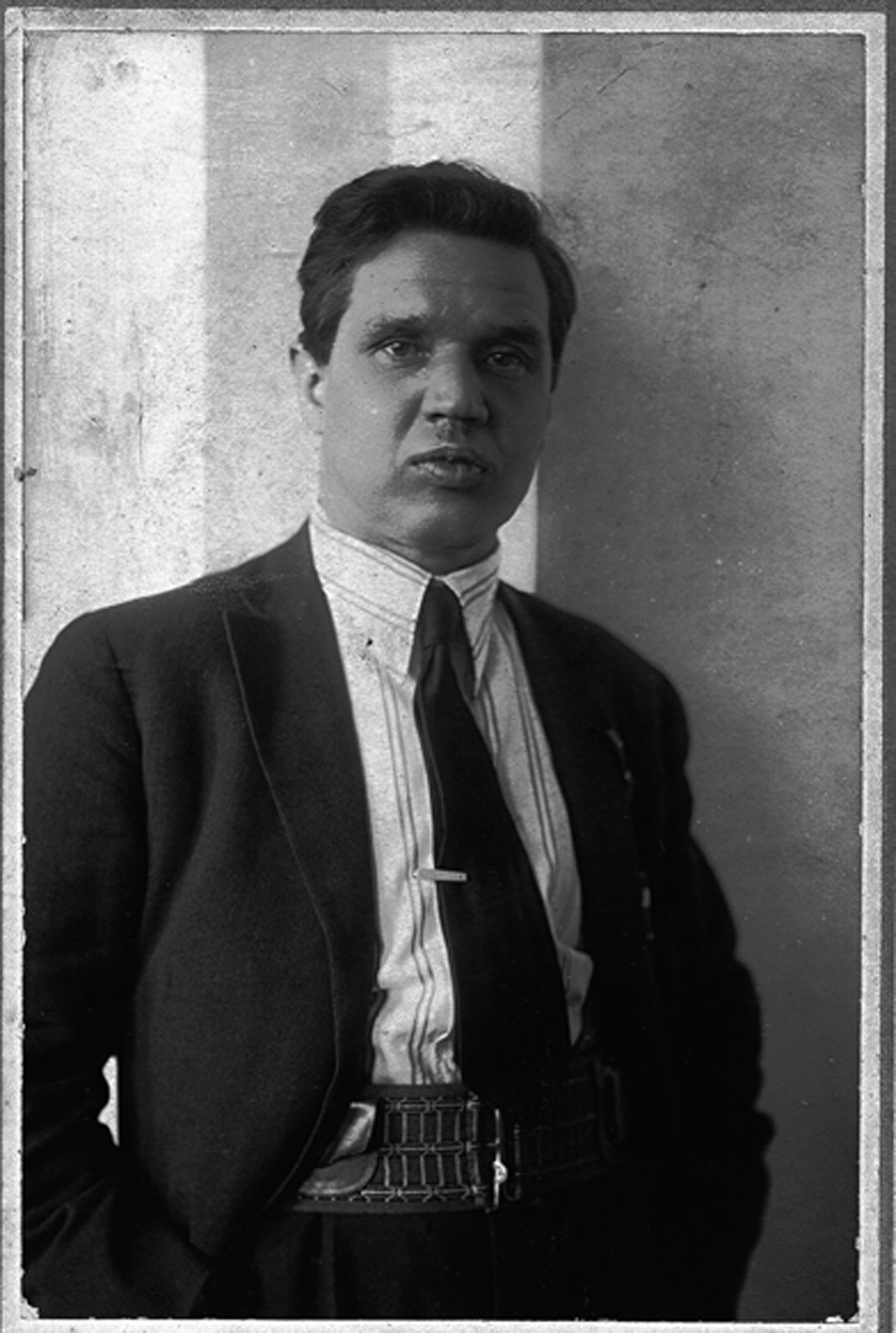

First Secretary of the All-Union Central Council of Trade Unions
- In office 1 June 1929 – 19 May 1930
- Preceded by: Mikhail Tomsky (as chairman)
- Succeeded by: Nikolai Shvernik

Personal details
- Born: September 20, 1888 Kazan Governorate, Russian Empire
- Died: 26 October 1936 (aged 48) Moscow, Russian SFSR, Soviet Union
- Party: RSDLP (Bolsheviks) (1908–1918); Russian Communist Party (1918–1930)
- Education: Longjumeau Party School

Alexander Ivanovich Dogadov (Russian: Алекса́ндр Ива́нович Дога́дов; 20 August 1888 – 26 October 1937) was a Russian Soviet statesman, Communist Party official and trade union leader who was the First Secretary of the All-Union Central Council of Trade Unions.

== Biography ==
Born to a working-class family in Kazan, he worked as metal worker. In 1905 he became a member of the Kazan committee of the Russian Social Democratic Labour Party and became a member of the Bolshevik combat organization.

Dogadov was leader of the Kazan Metal Workers' Union and participated in the 1905 Russian Revolution and was later arrested in 1907. He then moved to Baku and was active in the Bolshevik circles of the Caucasus. In 1910 he was sent to France and was a student in the Longjumeau Party School and, after the end of his studies, he returned to Kazan and became a delegate to the 6th Conference of the Russian Social Democratic Labour Party in Prague. Once he returned to Russia he was once again arrested and exiled to Yaransk.

In 1914 he was drafted into the Imperial Russian Army and fought on the Southwestern and Romanian fronts. He participated in the February and October Revolutions.

From February 1918 he worked in Kazan and was the chairman of the Council of Trade Unions of the Kazan Industrial Region (gubernia trade union) and member of the Presidium of the Council of National Economy of Kazan Province. In 1920-1921 he was People's Commissar of Labor of the Tatar Autonomous Soviet Socialist Republic and Chairman of the Tatar Council of Trade Unions.

From 1921 to 1929 he was secretary of the All-Union Council of Trade Unions and from 1921 to 1930 he was a member of the All-Russian Central Executive Committee. From 1921 to 1922 he was a member of the Central Committee and from 1924 to 1930 a member of the Organization Bureau. From June 1, 1929, to May 19, 1930, Dogadov served as the First Secretary of the All-Union Central Council of Trade Unions.

From 1930 to 1931 he was deputy head of the Supreme Council of National Economy as well as a candidate member of the Central Committee and the Organization Bureau. From 1931 to 1934 he was People's Commissar of the Workers' and Peasants' Inspection of the Transcaucasian SFSR, at the same time Chairman of the Transcaucasian Regional Control Commission of the All-Union Communist Party (b).

In May 1937, by decision of the Politburo he was expelled from the party. Dogadov was arrested on June 21, 1937; his wife Maria Nikolaevna and mother-in-law Felitsyna Maria Petrovna were also arrested. He was convicted on charges of anti-Soviet terrorist activities and sentenced to death on October 26 by decision of the Military Collegium of the Supreme Court of the USSR, then executed the same day. His ashes were buried in the Donskoye Cemetery.

Alexander Dogadov was posthumously rehabilitated by the decision of the Military Collegium of the Supreme Court of the Soviet Union in July 1956 and reinstated in the Communist Party by the decree of the Presidium in December 1957.
