= Nikolay Kubyak =

Russian revolutionary and Soviet politician (1881–1937)

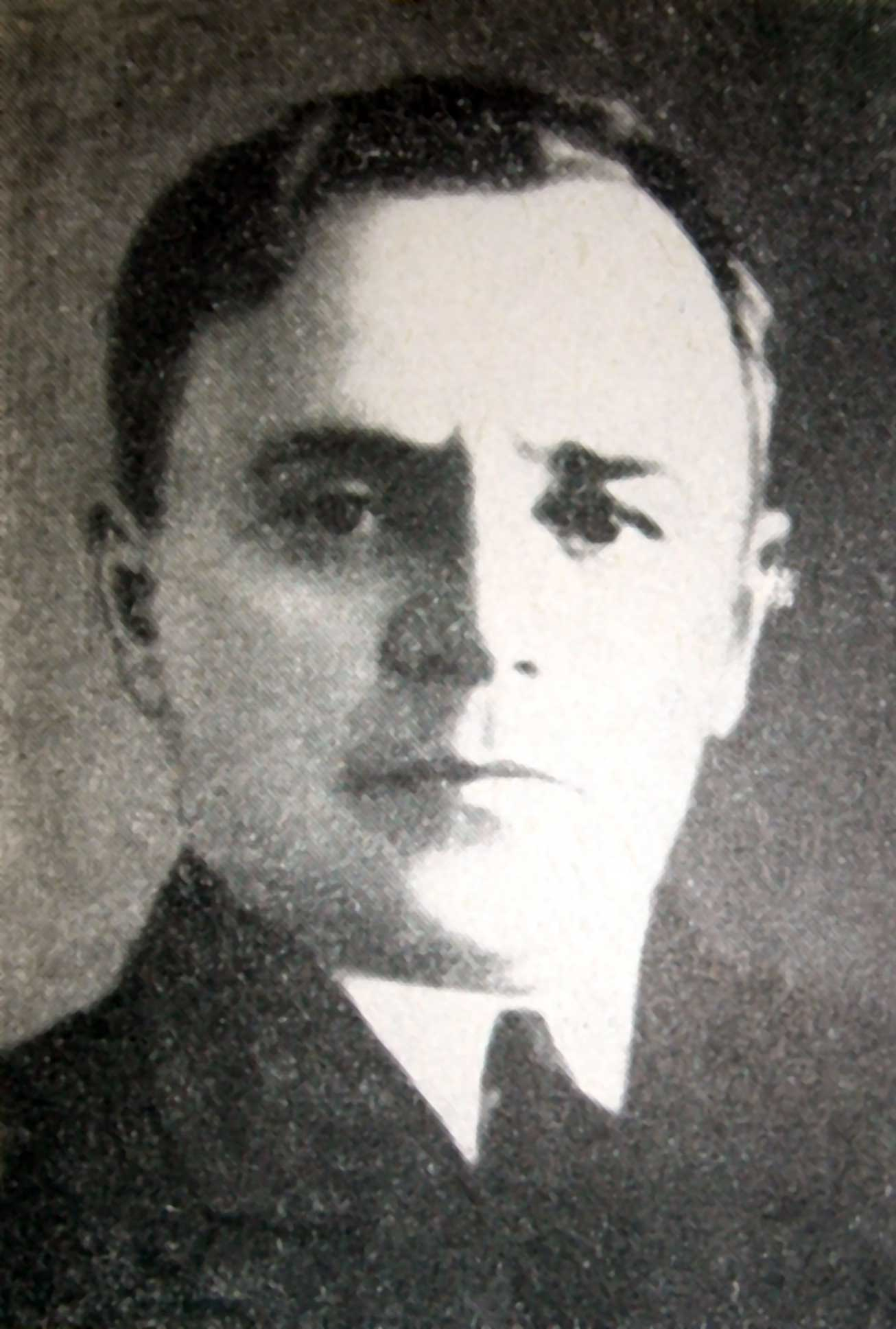

Nikolay Afanasyevich Kubyak (Russian: Николай Афанасьевич Кубяк; August 10 [O.S. July 29] 1881 – November 27, 1937) was a Soviet state and party figure. Chairman of the All-Union Council for Communal Services by Central Executive Committee of the Soviet Union (1933–1937).

== Biography ==
Born in the family of a foundry worker at the Bryansk factory in Bezhitsa. Of Russian ethnicity, he graduated from a parochial school.

Member of the Russian Social Democratic Labour Party since 1898.

In 1917 the commandant of the Beloostrov station, since May the deputy of the Petrograd Soviet, the chairman of the Sestroretsk Zemstvo Administration (May–October), the chairman of the Sestroretsk District Committee of the RSDLP (b).

After the October Revolution, he became a member of the Petrograd District Committee of the RSDLP (b), People's Commissar of Agriculture of the Northern Region. Secretary, in March 1918, the chairman of the Petrograd Gubernia Party Committee and the vice-chairman of the Provincial Executive Committee. Since May 1918 the chairman of the executive committee of the Petrograd gubsoviet.

From October 1918 to February 1920, the chairman of the Petrograd Gubernia Committee of the RCP (b), deputy chairman of the executive committee of the Petrograd Gub Council.

in 1919 he became a member of the Revolutionary Military Council of the Petrograd Front. From 1920, the chairman of the Central Committee of the All-Workers' Union, in March 1921 – 1922, the responsible instructor of the Central Committee of the RCP (b). Since July 1920 member of the All-Russian Extraordinary Commission for the Elimination of Illiteracy and Literacy of the People's Commissariat of Education of the RSFSR. In 1920, Kubyak joined the Workers' Opposition, although soon departed from it.

Since November 1925 the first secretary of the Far Eastern Regional Committee.

From February 16, 1928, to December 24, 1929, the People's Commissar of Agriculture of the RSFSR and then (until 1931) the chairman of the "Energocenter" of the Supreme Council of the National Economy of the USSR. In 1929-1931 he became a member of the Presidium of the Supreme Council of the National Economy . In 1931-1932 he became the chairman of the Ivanovo regional executive committee. From 1933, Chairman of the All-Union Council for Public Utilities at the Central Executive Committee of the USSR .

On June 13, 1937, he was arrested. At the June (1937) Plenum of the Central Committee of the VKP (b) he was excluded from the candidates for membership in the Central Committee and from the party. The Military Collegium of the Supreme Court of the USSR on November 27, 1937, was sentenced to death and shot on the same day. He was buried in the New Don Cemetery.

Rehabilitated by the Military Collegium of the Supreme Court of the Soviet Union on March 14, 1956. On March 22, 1956, the Central Control Commission in the CPSU Central Committee reinstated him in the party.
