= Daniil Sulimov =

Soviet-Russian statesman (1890–1937)

- Даниил Сулимов
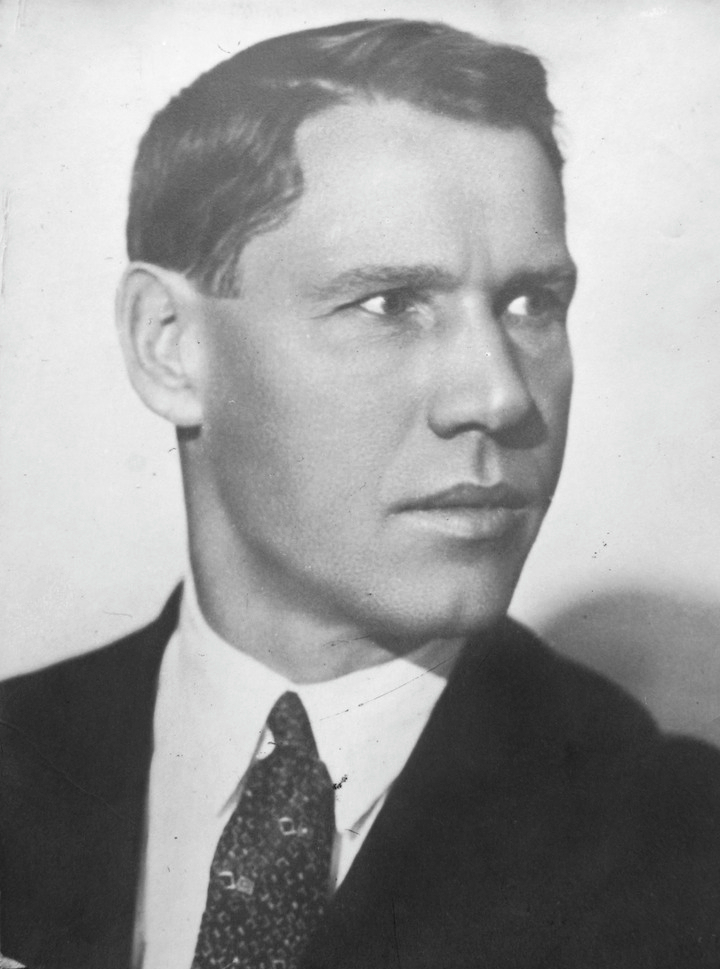
- Sulimov in 1937

Chairman of the Council of People's Commissars of the Russian SFSR
- In office 3 November 1930 – 22 July 1937
- President: Mikhail Kalinin
- Preceded by: Sergei Syrtsov
- Succeeded by: Nikolai Bulganin

Personal details
- Born: Daniil Yegorovich Sulimov; 3 January 1891 Minyar, Ufa Governorate, Russian Empire (now Chelyabinsk Oblast, Russia)
- Died: 27 November 1937 (aged 46) Moscow, Russian SFSR, Soviet Union
- Party: RSDLP (Bolsheviks) (1905–1918); Russian Communist Party (1918–1937)

Daniil Yegorovich Sulimov (Russian: Даниил Егорович Сулимов; 3 January 1891 [O.S. 22 December 1890] – 27 November 1937) was a Soviet-Russian statesman who was the Chairman of the Council of People's Commissars of the Russian SFSR from 1930 to 1937, the equivalent to Premier or Prime Minister.

He was arrested and executed during the Great Purge.

He was posthumously rehabilitated on 17 March 1956.
