= Aleksandr Petrovich Smirnov =

Russian-Soviet statesman (1877–1938)

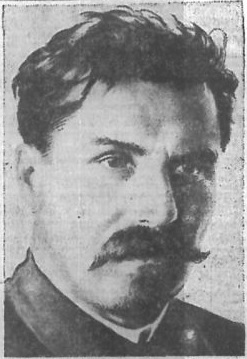
Smirnov in 1928

Aleksandr Petrovich Smirnov (Russian: Александр Петрович Смирнов; 9 September 1877 – 9 February 1938) was a Russian Old Bolshevik, revolutionary and Soviet statesman.

Born in to a peasant family, he later became a factoryworker. He became a member of the League of Struggle for the Emancipation of the Working Class in 1896. Smirnov was elected as a candidate member of the Central Committee of the RSDLP in 1907 and 1912.

In 1917 he became chairman of the soviet in Bogorodsk (present-day Noginsk), and a member of the presidium of the soviet of Moscow province.

From 1919 to 1922 he was Deputy People's Commissar for Food, and from 1923 to 1928 he was People's Commissar for Agriculture of the RSFSR and, at the same time, general secretary of the Peasant International.

He aligned himself with Joseph Stalin in the early 1920s. However, in 1933 he was expelled from the Central Committee, for his participation, together with Nikolai Eismont and Vladimir Tolmachev, in the Rightist Smirnov-Eismont-Tolmachev opposition group. Part of the accusation, though not other false charges against Smirnov, was later corroborated by some of Leon Trotsky's (who at the time was having contact with oppositionist groups in the USSR) private letters which mentioned that this group existed.

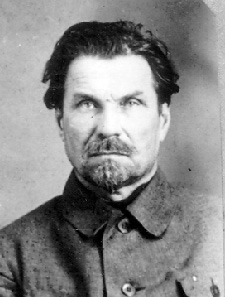
Alexandr Smirnov. Photo made by NKVD, after his arrest in 1937

In December 1934 he was expelled from the Communist Party for alleged anti-Party activities. Later, in March 1937, he was arrested. On February 8, 1938, the Military Collegium of the Supreme Court of the USSR sentenced him to death for alleged "Anti-Soviet activities". The verdict was executed on February 10, 1938.

He was rehabilitated in July 1958, and his CPSU membership was restored in 1960.
