= Central Committee of the 13th Congress of the All-Union Communist Party (Bolsheviks) =

Supreme political authority in Soviet Union 1924–1925

Central Committee of the 13th Congress
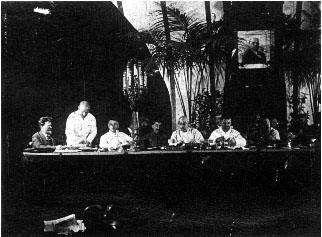
- The Presidium of the 13th Party Congress

2 June 1924 – 31 December 1925

Leadership
- General Secretary: Joseph Stalin
- Second Secretary: Vyacheslav Molotov
- Inner-groups: Politburo: 7 full & 6 candidates Secretariat: 7 full & 3 candidates Orgburo: 12 full & 6 candidates

Candidates

Apparatus
- No. of departments: 11

The Central Committee (CC) composition was elected by the 13th Congress, and sat from 2 June 1924 until 31 December 1925. The CC 1st Plenary Session renewed the composition of the Politburo, Secretariat and the Organizational Bureau (OB) of the All-Union Communist Party (Bolsheviks).

== Plenums ==
The CC was not a permanent institution. It convened plenary sessions, of which nine CC plenary sessions and one joint CC–Central Control Commission (CCC) plenary sessions were held between the 13th Congress and the 14th Congress. When the CC was not in session, decision-making powers were transferred to inner bodies of the CC itself; the Politburo, Secretariat and Orgburo (none of these bodies were permanent either, but convened several times a months).

Plenary sessions of the Central Committee
Plenum	Date	Length
1st Plenary Session	2 June 1924	1 day
2nd Plenary Session	16–20 June 1924	5 days
3rd Plenary Session	25–27 October 1924	3 days
Joint Plenary Session	17 January 1925	1 day
4th Plenary Session	17–20 January 1925	4 days
5th Plenary Session	23 April 1925	1 day
6th Plenary Session	30 April 1925	1 day
7th Plenary Session	3–10 October 1925	8 days
8th Plenary Session	12–14 November 1925	3 days
9th Plenary Session	15 December 1925	1 day

== Apparatus ==
Individuals employed by Central Committee's bureaus, departments and newspapers made up the apparatus between the 13th Congress and the 14th Congress. The bureaus and departments were supervised by the Secretariat, and each secretary (member of the Secretariat) supervised a specific department. The leaders of departments were officially referred to as Heads, while the titles of bureau leaders varied between chairman, first secretary and secretary.

Central Committee Apparatus of the 13th Congress of the All-Union Communist Party (Bolsheviks)
Institution	Leader	Cyrillic	Took office	Left office	Length of tenure	Nationality	Gender
Administrator of Affairs	Pyotr Guzakov	Пётр Гузаков	2 June 1924	31 December 1925	1 year and 212 days	Russian	Male
Agitation and Propaganda Department	Sergei Syrtsov	Сергей Сырцов	2 June 1924	31 December 1925	1 year and 212 days	Russian	Male
Bolshevik	Nikolai Bukharin	Никола́й Буха́рин	2 June 1924	31 December 1925	1 year and 212 days	Russian	Male
Bureau of the Secretariat	Lev Mekhlis	Лев Мехлис	November 1924	31 December 1925	1 year and 31 days	Jewish	Male
Central Asian Bureau	Isaak Zelensky	Исаак Зеленский	2 June 1924	31 December 1925	1 year and 212 days	Jewish	Male
Department for Work Among Women	Klavdiya Nikolayeva	Клавдия Николаева	2 June 1924	31 December 1925	1 year and 212 days	Russian	Female
Department of Party History	Mikhail Olminsky	Михаил Ольминский	2 June 1924	31 December 1924	212 days	Russian	Male
Department of Party History	Semyon Kanatchikov	Семён Канатчиков	1 January 1925	31 December 1925	364 days	Russian	Male
Far Eastern Bureau	Nikolai Kubiak	Николай Кубяк	2 June 1924	31 December 1925	1 year and 212 days	Russian	Male
Finance Department	P. N. Ivanov	П. Н. Иванов	2 June 1924	31 December 1925	1 year and 212 days	Russian	Male
Information Department	Vilhelm Knorin	Вильгельм Кнорин	2 June 1924	8 July 1925	1 year and 36 days	Latvian	Male
Information Department	Lev Roshal	Лев Рошаль	8 July 1925	31 December 1925	176 days	Jewish	Male
Lenin Institute	Lev Kamenev	Лев Ка́менев	2 June 1924	31 December 1925	1 year and 212 days	Jewish-Russian (Note: His father was Jewish and his mother Russian)	Male
Organizational and Distribution Department	Lazar Kaganovich	Лазарь Каганович	2 June 1924	27 October 1924	147 days	Jewish	Male
Organizational and Distribution Department	Nikolay Antipov	Николай Антипов	27 October 1924	27 July 1925	273 days	Russian	Male
Organizational and Distribution Department	Konstantin Gey	Константин Гей	27 July 1925	31 December 1925	157 days	Russian	Male
Pravda	Nikolai Bukharin	Никола́й Буха́рин	2 June 1924	27 October 1924	147 days	Russian	Male
Press Department	Semyon Kanatchikov	Семён Канатчиков	2 June 1924	27 October 1924	147 days	Russian	Male
Press Department	Juozas Vareikis	Иосиф Варейкис	27 October 1924	31 December 1925	1 year and 65 days	Lithuanian	Male
Provisional Byelorussian Bureau	Aleksandr Osatkin	Александр Асаткин	2 June 1924	31 December 1925	1 year and 212 days	Russian	Male
Siberian Bureau	Stanislav Kosior	Станислав Косиор	2 June 1924	27 October 1924	147 days	Polish	Male
South-East Bureau	Anastas Mikoyan	Анастас Микоян	2 June 1924	27 October 1924	147 days	Armenian	Male

== Composition ==
=== Members ===
Members of the Central Committee of the 13th Congress of the All-Union Communist Party (Bolsheviks)
Name	Cyrillic	12th CC	14th CC	Birth	Death	PM	Nationality	Gender	Portrait
Andrey Andreyev	Андрей Андреев	Old	Reelected	1895	1971	1914	Russian	Male	
Nikolay Antipov	Николай Антипов	New	Reelected	1894	1938	1912	Russian	Male	
Andrei Bubnov	Андрей Бубнов	Old	Reelected	1884	1938	1903	Russian	Male	
Nikolai Bukharin	Никола́й Буха́рин	Old	Reelected	1888	1938	1906	Russian	Male	
Vlas Chubar	Влас Чубар	Old	Reelected	1891	1939	1907	Ukrainian	Male	
Alexander Dogadov	Александр Догадов	New	Reelected	1888	1937	1905	Russian	Male	—
Felix Dzerzhinsky	Фе́ликс Дзержи́нский	Old	Reelected	1877	1926	1906	Polish	Male	
Mikhail Frunze	Михаил Фрунзе	Old	Died	1885	1925	1904	Romanian-Russian (Note: His father was Romanian and his mother Russian)	Male	
Lazar Kaganovich	Лазарь Каганович	Candidate	Reelected	1893	1991	1911	Jewish	Male	
Mikhail Kalinin	Михаил Калинин	Old	Reelected	1875	1946	1898	Russian	Male	
Lev Kamenev	Лев Ка́менев	Old	Reelected	1883	1936	1901	Jewish-Russian (Note: His father was Jewish and his mother Russian)	Male	
Moisei Kharitonov	Моисей Харитонов	Old	Not	1887	1938	1905	Jewish	Male	
Sergey Kirov	Серге́й Ки́ров	Old	Reelected	1886	1934	1904	Russian	Male	
Nikolay Kolotilov	Николай Колотилов	Candidate	Reelected	1885	1937	1903	Russian	Male	—
Nikolay Komarov	Николай Комаров	Old	Reelected	1886	1937	1909	Russian	Male	
Stanislav Kosior	Станислав Косиор	Candidate	Reelected	1889	1939	1907	Polish	Male	
Leonid Krasin	Леонид Красин	New	Reelected	1870	1926	1898	Russian	Male	
Gleb Krzhizhanovsky	Глеб Кржижано́вский	New	Reelected	1872	1959	1898	Polish-German (Note: His father was Polish and his mother German)	Male	
Nikolay Kubyak	Николай Кубяк	Old	Reelected	1881	1937	1898	Russian	Male	
Alexander Kuklin	Александр Куклин	New	Not	1876	1936	1903	Russian	Male	—
Emanuel Kviring	Эммануил Квиринг	Old	Reelected	1888	1937	1912	Volga German	Male	
Mikhail Lashevich	Михаил Лашевич	Old	Candidate	1894	1937	1901	Jewish	Male	
Ivan Lepse	Иван Лепсе	Candidate	Reelected	1889	1929	1906	Latvian	Male	—
Semyon Lobov	Семён Ло́бов	New	Reelected	1888	1937	1913	Russian	Male	—
Dmitry Manuilsky	Дмитро Мануїльський	Old	Reelected	1883	1959	1903	Ukrainian	Male	
Alexei Medvedev	Алексей Медведев	New	Reelected	1884	1937	1904	Russian	Male	
Vasily Mikhailov	Василий Михайлов	Old	Reelected	1894	1937	1915	Russian	Male	
Anastas Mikoyan	Анастас Микоян	Old	Reelected	1895	1978	1915	Armenian	Male	
Vyacheslav Molotov	Вячеслав Молотов	Old	Reelected	1890	1986	1906	Russian	Male	
Klavdiya Nikolayeva	Клавдия Николаева	New	Candidate	1893	1944	1909	Russian	Female	
Grigol Ordzhonikidze	Григо́рий Орджоники́дзе	Old	Reelected	1886	1937	1903	Georgian	Male	
Grigory Petrovsky	Григо́рій Петро́вський	Old	Reelected	1878	1958	1898	Ukrainian	Male	a bearded man with wavy hair, wearing glasses and what seems to be a suit, a white tie, and a black and white dotted shirt
Georgy Pyatakov	Юрій П'ятаков	Old	Reelected	1890	1937	1910	Russian	Male	
Christian Rakovsky	Христиан Раковский	Old	Reelected	1873	1941	1917	Bulgarian	Male	
Jānis Rudzutaks	Ян Рудзутак	Old	Reelected	1887	1938	1906	Latvian	Male	
Moisey Rukhimovich	Моисей Рухимович	New	Reelected	1889	1937	1913	Jewish	Male	
Ivan Rumyantsev	Иван Румянцев	Candidate	Reelected	1886	1937	1905	Russian	Male	
Alexei Rykov	Алексей Рыков	Old	Reelected	1881	1938	1898	Russian	Male	
Isaak Schwartz	Исаак Шварц	New	Reelected	1879	1951	1899	Jewish	Male	
Alexander Smirnov	Александр Смирнов	Old	Reelected	1878	1938	1898	Russian	Male	
Grigori Sokolnikov	Григорий Сокольников	Old	Reelected	1888	1938	1905	Jewish	Male	
Joseph Stalin	Ио́сиф Ста́лин	Old	Reelected	1878	1953	1898	Georgian	Male	
Daniil Sulimov	Даниил Сулимов	Old	Reelected	1890	1937	1905	Russian	Male	
Mikhail Tomsky	Михаил Томский	Old	Reelected	1880	1936	1904	Russian	Male	
Leon Trotsky	Лев Тро́цкий	Old	Reelected	1879	1940	1917	Jewish	Male	
Alexander Tsiurupa	Алекса́ндр Цюру́па	Old	Reelected	1870	1928	1898	Ukrainian	Male	
Nikolai Uglanov	Николай Угланов	Old	Reelected	1886	1937	1907	Russian	Male	
Konstantin Ukhanov	Константин Уханов	Old	Reelected	1891	1937	1907	Russian	Male	
Kliment Voroshilov	Климент Ворошилов	Old	Reelected	1881	1969	1903	Russian	Male	
Grigory Yevdokimov	Григорий Евдокимов	Old	Reelected	1884	1936	1903	Russian	Male	
Isaak Zelensky	Исаак Зеленский	Old	Reelected	1890	1937	1906	Jewish	Male	
Pyotr Zalutsky	Петро Залуцький	Old	Reelected	1887	1937	1907	Russian	Male	
Grigory Zinoviev	Григо́рий Зино́вьев	Old	Reelected	1883	1936	1901	Jewish	Male	

=== Candidates ===
Candidate Members of the Central Committee of the 13th Congress of the All-Union Communist Party (Bolsheviks)
Name	Cyrillic	12th CC	14th CC	Birth	Death	PM	Nationality	Gender	Portrait
Aleksandra Artyukhina	Александра Артюхина	New	Member	1889	1969	1910	Russian	Female	
Aleksei Badayev	Алексей Бадаев	Candidate	Member	1883	1951	1904	Russian	Male	
Nikolai Chaplin	Николай Чаплин	New	Candidate	1902	1938	1919	Russian	Male	—
Mikhail Chudov	Михаил Чудов	Candidate	Member	1893	1937	1913	Russian	Male	—
Konstantin Gey	Константин Гей	New	Candidate	1896	1939	1916	Russian	Male	
Nikolai Glebov-Avilov	Николай Глебов-Авиловй	New	Not	1887	1937	1904	Russian	Male	
Filipp Goloshchyokin	Филипп Голощёкин	New	Candidate	1876	1941	1903	Jewish	Male	
Andriy Ivanov	Андрей Иванов	New	Not	1891	1937	1906	Russian	Male	
Vasily Ivanov	Василий Иванов	New	Not	1885	1938	1917	Russian	Male	—
Ivan Kabakov	Иван Кабаков	New	Member	1891	1937	1914	Russian	Male	—
Kuprian Kirkizh	Куприян Киркиж	New	Member	1886	1932	1910	Belarusian	Male	
Georgy Korostelov	Георгий Коростелёв	New	Not	1885	1932	1905	Russian	Male	—
Alexander Krinitsky	Александр Криницкий	New	Candidate	1894	1937	1915	Russian	Male	
Alexander Markov	Александр Марков	New	Candidate	1877	1935	1898	Russian	Male	—
Alexander Miasnikian	Александр Мясников	Candidate	Died	1886	1925	1906	Armenian	Male	
Ivan Morozov	Иван Морозов	Candidate	Not	1889	1959	1908	Russian	Male	—
Ivan Moskvin	Иван Москвин	Candidate	Candidate	1890	1937	1911	Russian	Male	
Nariman Narimanov	Нарима́нов Нарима́н	Candidate	Died	1870	1925	1905	Azerbaijani	Male	
Mamia Orakhelashvili	Мамия Орахелашвили	Candidate	Candidate	1888	1937	1903	Georgian	Male	
Abdullo Rakhimbayev	Абдулло Рахимбаев	New	Not	1896	1938	1919	Uzbek	Male	
Konstantin Rumyantsev	Константин Румянцев	New	Candidate	1889	1939	1916	Russian	Male	—
Kuzma Ryndin	Кузьма Рындин	New	Candidate	1893	1938	1915	Russian	Male	—
Georgy Safarov	Георгий Сафаров	New	Not	1891	1942	1908	Armenian-Polish	Male	
Vasily Schmidt	Василий Шмидт	New	Member	1886	1938	1905	German	Male	
Mykola Skrypnyk	Микола Скрипник	Candidate	Candidate	1872	1933	1898	Ukrainian	Male	
Ivar Smilga	Ивар Смилга	New	Member	1892	1938	1907	Latvian	Male	
Konstantin Strievsky	Константин Стриевский	New	Candidate	1885	1938	1902	Belarusian	Male	—
Sergei Syrtsov	Сергей Сырцов	New	Candidate	1893	1937	1913	Russian	Male	
Aleksandr Tolokontsev	Александр Толоконцев	New	Member	1889	1937	1914	Russian	Male	—
Viktoria Tseitlin	Виктория Цейтлин	New	Not	1888	1937	1904	Russian	Female	—
Mikhail Uryvayev	Михаил Урываев	Candidate	Candidate	1887	1937	1917	Russian	Male	—
Iosif Vareikis	Иосиф Варейкис	New	Candidate	1894	1938	1913	Lithuanian	Male	—
Miron Vladimirov	Мирон Владимиров	New	Died	1879	1925	1903	Jewish	Male	
Sergey Zorin	Сергей Зорин	New	Not	1891	1937	1917	Jewish	Male	
