= Secretariat of the 13th Congress of the All-Union Communist Party (Bolsheviks) =

The 13th Secretariat of the Communist Party of the Soviet Union was elected by the 1st plenary session of the 13th Central Committee, in the immediate aftermath of the 13th Congress.

== Full members ==
| Name (birth–death) | Took office | Left office | Duration | Note |
|---|---|---|---|---|
| Andrei Andreyev (1895–1971) | 6 June 1924 | 31 December 1925 | 1 year, 208 days | — |
| Andrei Bubnov (1883–1938) | 30 April 1925 | 31 December 1925 | 1 year, 208 days | Elected at the 6th plenary session. |
| Lazar Kaganovich (1893–1991) | 6 June 1924 | 30 April 1925 | 1 year, 208 days | Relieved of his duties at the 6th plenary session. |
| Vyacheslav Molotov (1890–1986) | 6 June 1924 | 31 December 1925 | 1 year, 208 days | — |
| Joseph Stalin (1878–1953) | 6 June 1924 | 31 December 1925 | 1 year, 208 days | Elected General Secretary at the 1st plenary session. |
| Nikolai Uglanov (1886–1937) | 20 August 1924 | 31 December 1925 | 1 year, 133 days | Elected at the 6th plenary session. |
| Isaak Zelensky (1890–1938) | 6 June 1924 | 20 August 1924 | 75 days | Relieved of his duties at the 2nd plenary session. |

== Candidate members ==
| Name (birth–death) | Took office | Left office | Duration | Note |
|---|---|---|---|---|
| Nikolay Antipov (1894–1938) | 12 June 1924 | 31 December 1925 | 3 years, 202 days | The Politburo appointed him a member of the Secretariat. |
| Klavdiya Nikolayeva (1893–1944) | 12 June 1924 | 31 December 1925 | 3 years, 202 days | The Politburo appointed her a member of the Secretariat. |
| Pyotr Zalutsky (1887–1937) | 12 June 1924 | 31 December 1925 | 3 years, 202 days | The Politburo appointed him a member of the Secretariat. |
