= Orgburo of the 13th Congress of the All-Union Communist Party (Bolsheviks) =

Organisational Bureau of Soviet Union (1924–25)

The 13th Orgburo of the Russian Communist Party (Bolsheviks) was elected by the 1st Plenary Session of the 13th Central Committee on 2 June 1924, in the immediate aftermath of the 13th Congress.

== Full members ==
Name (birth–death)	Took office	Left office	Duration	Note
Andrey Andreyev (1895–1971)	2 June 1924	1 January 1926	1 year, 213 days	—
Andrei Bubnov (1884–1938)	2 June 1924	1 January 1926	1 year, 213 days	—
Kliment Voroshilov (1881–1969)	2 June 1924	1 January 1926	1 year, 213 days	—
Alexander Dogadov (1888–1937)	2 June 1924	1 January 1926	1 year, 213 days	—
Isaak Zelensky (1890–1938)	2 June 1924	1 January 1926	1 year, 213 days	Relieved of his duties at the 2nd Plenary Session.
Lazar Kaganovich (1893–1991)	2 June 1924	1 January 1926	1 year, 213 days	—
Mikhail Kalinin (1875–1946)	2 June 1924	1 January 1926	1 year, 213 days	—
Vyacheslav Molotov (1890–1986)	2 June 1924	1 January 1926	1 year, 213 days	—
Klavdiya Nikolayeva (1893–1944)	2 June 1924	1 January 1926	1 year, 213 days	—
Alexander Smirnov (1878–1938)	2 June 1924	1 January 1926	1 year, 213 days	—
Joseph Stalin (1878–1953)	2 June 1924	1 January 1926	1 year, 213 days	—
Nikolai Uglanov (1886–1937)	20 August 1924	1 January 1926	1 year, 134 days	Elected at the 2nd Plenary Session.

== Candidate members ==
Name (birth–death)	Took office	Left office	Duration	Note
Nikolay Antipov (1894–1938)	2 June 1924	1 January 1926	1 year, 213 days	—
Felix Dzerzhinsky (1877–1926)	2 June 1924	1 January 1926	1 year, 213 days	—
Ivan Lepse (1889–1929)	2 June 1924	1 January 1926	1 year, 213 days	—
Mikhail Tomsky (1880–1936)	2 June 1924	1 January 1926	1 year, 213 days	—
Nikolai Chaplin (1902–1938)	2 June 1924	1 January 1926	1 year, 213 days	—
Mikhail Frunze (1885–1925)	2 June 1924	31 October 1925	1 year, 145 days	Died in office.
