= Matvei Shkiryatov =

Soviet Communist Party official

- Матвей Шкирятов
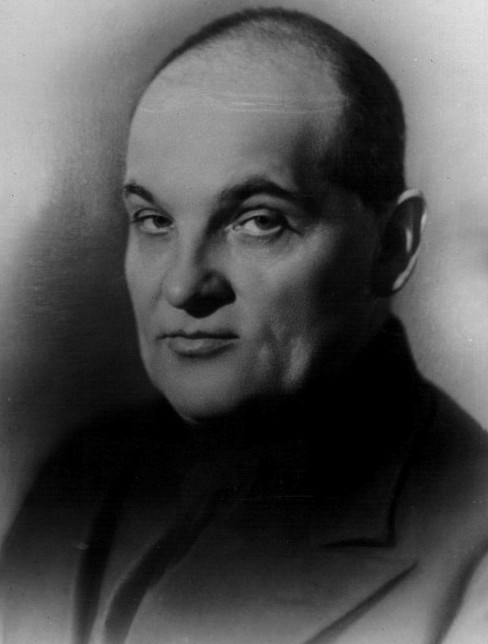
- Shkiryatov in 1938

Chairman of the Party Control Committee of CPSU
- In office 16 October 1952 – 18 January 1954
- Preceded by: Andrei Andreyev
- Succeeded by: Nikolai Shvernik (Vacant from 1954–1956)

Personal details
- Born: 15 August 1883 Vishnyakovo, Tula, Russian Empire
- Died: 18 January 1954 (aged 70) Moscow, Russian SFSR, Soviet Union
- Resting place: Kremlin Wall Necropolis
- Citizenship: Soviet Union
- Party: Russian Communist Party (1906–1954)
- Awards: 3 Orders of Lenin, Medal "For Valiant Labor in the Great Patriotic War 1941-1945"

Matvei Fyodorovich Shkiryatov (Russian: Матвей Фёдорович Шкирятов; 15 August [O.S. 3 August] 1883 — 18 January 1954) was a Communist Party official and functionary who rose to power in the Soviet Union during the rule of Joseph Stalin. His entire career was spent imposing party discipline through the Central Control Commission of the Communist Party of the Soviet Union. Though far less well known than successive chiefs of the Soviet police, such as Nikolai Yezhov or Lavrentiy Beria, he was arguably as steeply involved as either of them in the repression during the Stalin years. Unlike them, he escaped arrest or public notoriety.

== Early career ==
Matvei Shkiryatov was the son of a peasant, born in a village called Vishnyakovo, in Tula Province. He joined the Bolshevik faction of the Russian Social Democratic Labour Party in 1906, and worked in the illegal party organisation in Moscow, Rostov-on-Don and Tula. He was arrested repeatedly, but avoided being deported to Siberia or held in prison for very long. There is no evidence that these arrests were for political activity. He was drafted into the imperial army in 1915. After the February Revolution, he was elected to the executive of the Moscow and Tula soviets. In 1918–20, he was secretary of the Moscow branch of the Garment Workers' Union.

== Party official ==
In 1921, Vladimir Lenin ordered a purge of the communist party, to remove unsuitable individuals who had joined during the chaos of the civil war. Shkiryatov was transferred to the staff of the Central Control Commission (CCC) to assist. At first, he was rooting out drunkards, criminals and other undesirables, but soon progressed to purging those who opposed Stalin on political grounds, which became his life's work. He was a member of the Praesidium of the CCC, 1923–34, and secretary of the CCC 1923-24 and 1930–34. In 1927–34, he was also of a member of the board of Rabkrin. In 1934, the CCC was reorganised, and renamed the Party Control Commission. He was its secretary in 1934–39, its deputy chairman in 1939–52, and a member of its praesidium until his death in 1954. He was also a member of the Central Committee of the communist party from 1939. In 1952 he became chairman of the Party Control Committee, a post he held till his death.

== Role in the purges ==
In January 1933, the Central Committee heard a case presented by Shkiryatov and the CCC Chairman Jan Rudzutak against a group of Bolsheviks who had had a private meeting at which they had discussed the crisis in the countryside, including mass starvation known in Ukraine as Holodomor, and had talked about removing Stalin from office. Shkiryatov claimed that this could only mean that they were plotting an act of violence against Stalin. He also attacked the Old Bolshevik A.P. Smirnov, a party member since 1898, who had not taken part in the conversation but knew those involved. Shkiryatov challenged him to prove that he did not sympathise with the opposition. Smirnov and the others were expelled from the party, and later shot.

In 1933, the novelist Mikhail Sholokhov wrote a long, angry and detailed letter to Stalin about mass starvation in his home district of Veshenskaya, near Rostov, and about the abusive behaviour of named police officers. Shkiryatov was sent to the region in May 1933 with instructions to placate Sholokhov, whose work Stalin valued, and after a ten-day investigations, recommended that two men whom Sholokhov had accused of torturing prisoners should be shot, and two other officials sacked. The death sentences were commuted. In May 1935, Shkiryatov headed the commission which forcibly disbanded the Society of Old Bolsheviks, whose members had been collecting signatures for a petition against using the death penalty against former party members who opposed Stalin's line.

In February 1937, Shkiryatov again acted as a prosecutor at a plenum of the Central Committee, when the two of Lenin's former comrades, Nikolai Bukharin and Alexei Rykov were accused of having plotted against Stalin. He declared: "What makes you think, Bukharin and Rykov, that leniency will be shown to you?...We cannot limit ourselves to merely expelling them from the party...They must be prosecuted." Both men were later put on trial, and shot.

Early in 1938, he was sent to the North Caucasus to purge the local party and ordered the arrests of the head of the NKVD in Rostov and Ordzhonikidze (Vladikavkaz) and many others, and the dismissal of the local party boss, Yefim Yevdokimov, and once again to investigate complaints raised by Sholokhov that innocent communists were being persecuted in the region. In 1939, he was put in charge of investigating the communist youth league, Komsomol, and sent Stalin a memo suggesting that the head of the organisation, Alexander Kosarev, should be reprimanding, adding: "If something is not right, you will correct me." Kosarev was arrested and shot.

In January 1948, Shkiryatov was one of the officials present at a famous conference in the Kremlin to which the leading Soviet musicians, including Dmitri Shostakovich and Sergei Prokofiev were summoned to be lectured on how to write music for a soviet audience by Stalin's cultural chief, Andrei Zhdanov. Reputedly, on the second day, Shkiryatov noticed that Prokofiev, the composer of Peter and the Wolf was talking, and ordered him to pay attention. Prokofiev retorted; "I never pay attention to people who haven't been introduced to me."

In December 1948, after the creation of the state of Israel had led Stalin to suspect that there were Jewish nationalists operating secretly in the USSR, Shkiryatov and the police chief Viktor Abakumov drew up a report denouncing Polina Zhemchuzhina, head of textile and wife of Vyacheslav Molotov for her links to the Jewish Anti-Fascist Committee. She was exiled to Kazakhstan.

== Personality ==
Leon Trotsky wrote an uncompleted note about Shkiryatov - "crushed, submissive, slightly drunken workingman. Little Shkiryatov would tell Lenin: 'Go away, don't bother us, or we'll burn you" but his long career demonstrated that he was ruthless, and humourless. In 1933, he warned that communists should not make jokes, because jokes were "sharp weapons" and "jokes against the party are agitation against the party". The historian A. Vaksberg wrote: "M. F. Shkiryatov - one of the most vile Stalinist apparatchiks, whose name, with full reason, stands in line with Yezhov and Beria. A long-time figure in the highest control organs of the party, who directed party cleansing and beating Party cadres. Worked hand in hand with the NKVD-MGB, had his "own" prison, where he personally interrogated especially important prisoners. He died without waiting for his conviction in any form."

Shkiryatov died of a heart attack and his ashes were buried at the Kremlin Wall Necropolis.
