= Orgburo =

Organisational office of the Communist Party of the Soviet Union

Orgburo of the Communist Party of the Soviet Union
- Emblem of the CPSU

Information
- Parent: Central Committee
- Succeeded by: Secretariat

The Orgburo (Russian: Оргбюро́, romanized: Orgbyuro), also known as the Organisational Bureau (Russian: организационное бюро, romanized: organizatsionnoye byuro), of the Central Committee of the Communist Party of the Soviet Union existed from 1919 to 1952, when it was abolished at the 19th Congress of the Communist Party and its functions were transferred to the enlarged Secretariat.

== Role ==
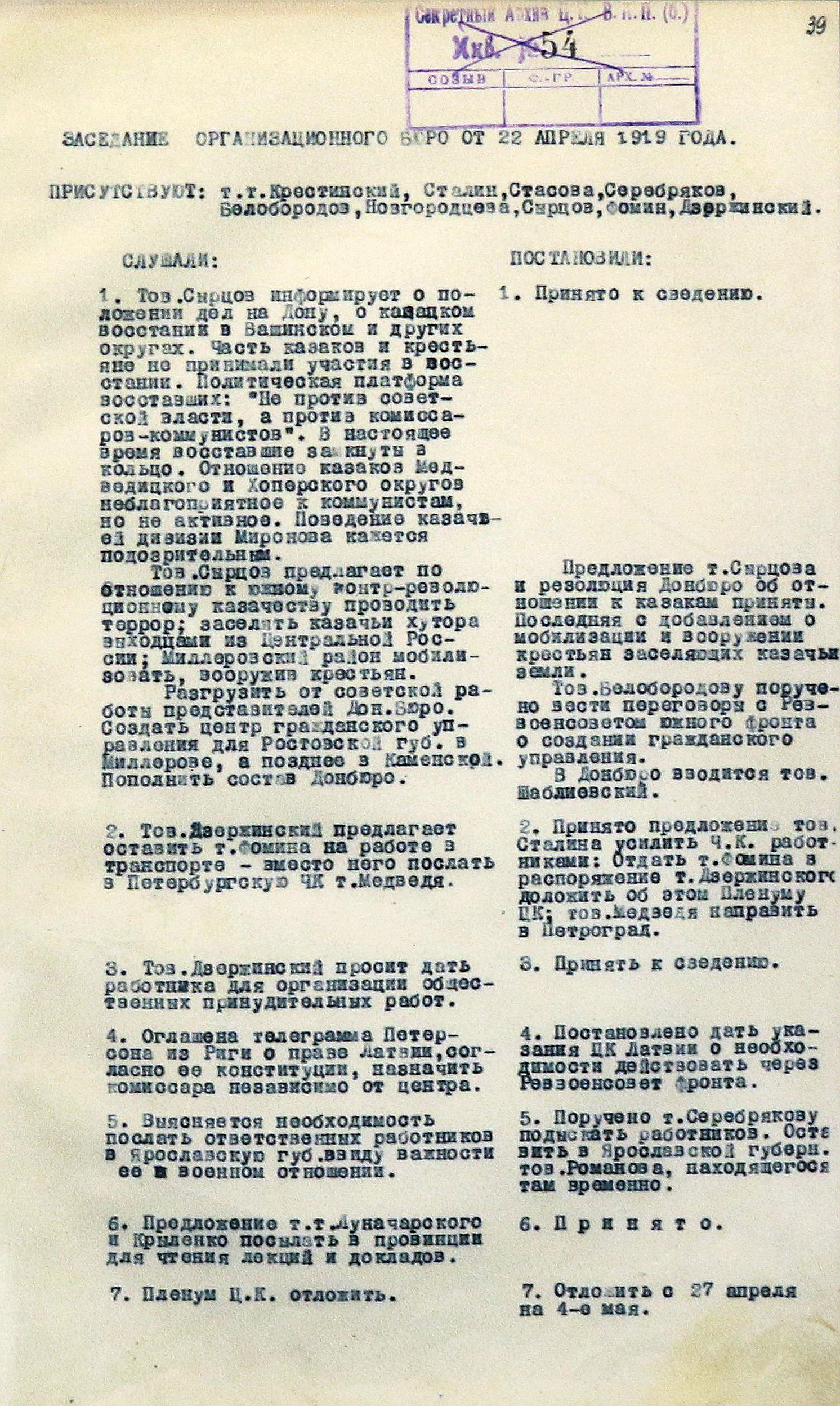
Minutes of an Orgburo meeting of April 1919 discussing the ongoing Russian Civil War.

The Orgburo was established during Lenin's government to make important decisions about organisational work in the Communist Party. It was originally designed to have equal political weight as Politburo and Secretariat. It oversaw the work of local Party committees and had the power to select and place Communist Party members in positions as it saw fit. The functions of the Orgburo and the Politburo were often interconnected, but the latter was ultimately the final decision-maker. While the Politburo mostly focused on strategic planning and monitoring of the people and status of the country, the Orgburo was tasked with overseeing the Party cadre and its assignment to various positions and duties, presumably in furtherance of the Party's strategic agenda.

== Election and chronology ==
In the same manner as the Politburo and the Secretariat, the Orgburo was elected at plenary sessions of the Central Committee. One of the Central Committee secretaries supervised the work of the Orgburo. The first Orgburo of three members (Vladimirsky, Krestinsky and Sverdlov) was elected on 16 January 1919, at the Central Committee meeting. The 8th Party Congress (8 March 1919 – 23 March 1919) amended the party charter and set up provisions for election of the Politburo, the Orgburo and the Secretariat. The Central Committee plenum elected the new Orgburo of five members and of one candidate member on 25 March 1919. Some key Communist politicians (such as Joseph Stalin, Vyacheslav Molotov, Lazar Kaganovich and others) served as members both of the Orgburo and of the Politburo, but most of the Orgburo members were less important figures than those elected to the Politburo and the Secretariat.

Date	Event
16 Jan 1919	Orgburo elected by the Central Committee: Vladimirsky, Krestinsky, Sverdlov (died 16 Mar 1919)
25 Mar 1919	Orgburo elected by the Central Committee: Alexander Beloborodov, Krestinsky, Leonid Serebryakov, Stalin, Elena Stasova; candidate member: Matvei Muranov
29 Nov 1919	Mikhail Kalinin elected full member at the Central Committee plenum
5 Apr 1920	Orgburo elected by the Central Committee: Krestinsky, Yevgeni Preobrazhensky, Alexei Rykov, Serebryakov, Stalin
16 Mar 1921	Orgburo elected by the Central Committee: Komarov, V.Mikhaylov, Molotov, Rykov, Stalin, Tomsky, Yaroslavsky; candidate members: Dzerzhinsky, Kalinin, Rudzutak
28 May 1921	Politburo approved Zalutsky, Kutuzov, Shmidt as candidate members
8 Aug 1921	Orgburo elected by the Central Committee: Dzerzhinsky, Zalutsky, V.Mikhaylov, Molotov, Rudzutak, Rykov, Stalin; candidate members: Kalinin, Kutuzov, Shmidt
3 Apr 1922	Orgburo elected by the Central Committee: Andreyev, Dzerzhinsky, Kuibyshev, Molotov, Rykov, Stalin, Tomsky; candidate members: Isaak Zelensky, Kalinin, Rudzutak
26 Apr 1923	Orgburo elected by the Central Committee: Andreyev, Dzerzhinsky, Molotov, Rudzutak, Rykov, Stalin, Tomsky; candidate members: Zelensky, Kalinin, V.Mikhaylov
25 Sep 1923	Zinoviev and Trotsky elected full members, Bukharin and Korotkov candidate members at the Central Committee plenum
2 Jun 1924	Orgburo elected by the Central Committee: Andreyev, Bubnov, Voroshilov, Dogadov, Zelensky, L.Kaganovich, Kalinin, Molotov, Nikolayeva, Smirnov, Stalin; candidate members: Antipov, Dzerzhinsky, Lepse, Tomsky, Chaplin, Frunze (died 31 Oct 1925)
20 Aug 1924	Zelensky relieved of duties at the Central Committee plenum; Nikolai Uglanov elected full member
1 Jan 1926	Orgburo elected by the Central Committee: Andreyev, Artyuhina, Bubnov, Dogadov, Yevdokimov, Kviring, Kosior, Molotov, Smirnov, Stalin, Uglanov; candidate members: Lepse, V.Mikhaylov, Ukhanov, Chaplin, Shmidt
9 Apr 1926	Yevdokimov relieved of duties at the Central Committee plenum; Shvernik elected full member
16 Apr 1927	Shvernik and Kviring relieved of duties at the Central Committee plenum; Kubyak, Sulimov and Rukhimovich elected full members, Lobov elected candidate member
19 Dec 1927	Orgburo elected by the Central Committee: Andreyev, Artyuhina, Bubnov, Dogadov, Kosior, Kubyak, Molotov, Moskvin, Rukhimovich, Smirnov, Stalin, Sulimov, Uglanov; candidate members: Kotov, Lepse (died 6 Oct 1929), Lobov, V.Mikhaylov, Ukhanov, Chaplin, Shmidt
11 Apr 1928	Andreyev relieved of duties at the joint plenum of the Central Committee and the Central Control Commission; Bauman elected full member, Antipov elected candidate member
12 Jul 1928	Kosior relieved of duties at the Central Committee plenum; L.Kaganovich elected full member
29 Apr 1929	Uglanov relieved of duties at the Central Committee plenum
17 Nov 1929	Gamarnik elected full member at the Central Committee plenum; Shvernik elected candidate member
13 Jul 1930	Orgburo elected by the Central Committee: Akulov, Bauman, Bubnov, Gamarnik, L.Kaganovich, Lobov, Molotov, Moskvin, Postyshev, Stalin, Shvernik; candidate members: Dogadov, Kosarev, Smirnov, Tsikhon
21 Dec 1930	Molotov relieved of duties at the joint plenum of the Central Committee and the Central Control Commission
2 Oct 1932	Akulov, Bauman and Dogadov relieved of duties at the Central Committee plenum
12 Jan 1933	Smirnov relieved of duties at the joint plenum of the Central Committee and the Central Control Commission
10 Feb 1934	Orgburo elected by the Central Committee: Gamarnik (committed suicide 31 May 1937), Yezhov, Zhdanov, L.Kaganovich, Kirov (assassinated 1 Dec 1934), Kosarev (arrested 29 Nov 1938, executed 23 Feb 1939), Kuibyshev (died 25 Jan 1935), Stalin, Stetsky (arrested Apr 1938, executed 1 Aug 1938), Shvernik; candidate members: M.Kaganovich, Krinitsky (executed 30 Oct 1937)
10 Mar 1935	Andreyev approved full member by questionnaire
14 Jan 1938	Mekhlis elected full member at the Central Committee plenum
22 Mar 1939	Orgburo elected by the Central Committee: Andreyev, Zhdanov, L.Kaganovich, Malenkov, Mekhlis, N.Mikhaylov, Stalin, Shvernik, Shcherbakov (died 10 May 1945)
18 Mar 1946	Orgburo elected by the Central Committee: Aleksandrov, Andrianov, Bulganin, Zhdanov (died 31 Aug 1948), A.Kuznetsov, V.Kuznetsov, Malenkov, Mekhlis, N.Mikhaylov, Patolichev, Popov, Rodionov, Stalin, Suslov, Shatalin
24 May 1947	Patolichev relieved of duties by questionnaire
7 Mar 1949	A.Kuznetsov and Rodionov relieved of duties by questionnaire
10 Mar 1949	Chernousov approved full member by questionnaire
Oct 1952	Orgburo abolished at the CPSU 19th Party Congress and duties transferred to Secretariat

== See also ==
- Cadre management in the Soviet Union
- Uchraspred
- Organization Department of the Chinese Communist Party
- Central Organization Commission of the Communist Party of Vietnam
- Cadre (politics)
