= Moisey Rukhimovich =

Russian revolutionary, Soviet bureaucrat and politician (1889–1938)

- Моисей Рухимович
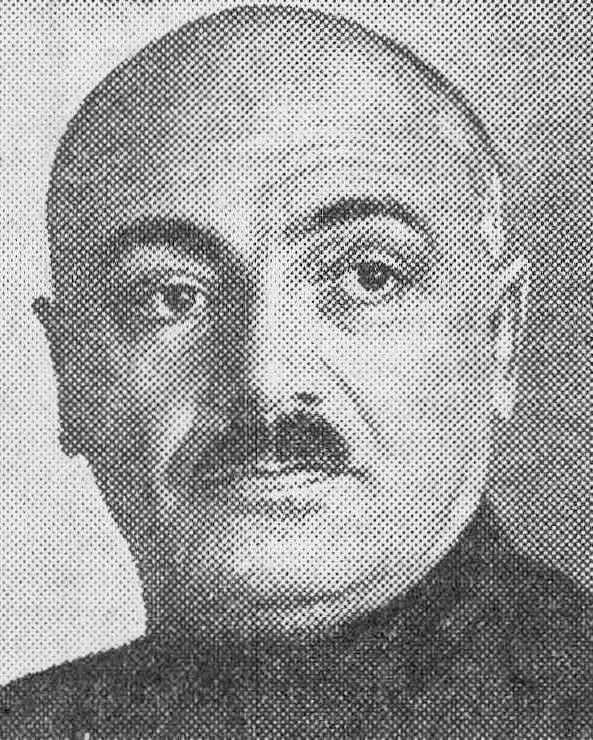
- Rukhimovich in 1936

3rd People's Commissar of Communication Routes
- In office June 11, 1930 – October 2, 1931
- Premier: Vyacheslav Molotov
- Preceded by: Jānis Rudzutaks
- Succeeded by: Andrey Andreyev

1st People's Commissar of the Defense Industry of the Soviet Union
- In office December 8, 1936 – October 15, 1937
- Premier: Vyacheslav Molotov
- Preceded by: Office established
- Succeeded by: Mikhail Kaganovich

Personal details
- Born: October 1889 Kagalnik, Russian Empire
- Died: July 29, 1938 (aged 48) Moscow, Russian SFSR, Soviet Union
- Party: Bund (1904–1913); RSDLP (Bolsheviks) (1913–1918); Russian Communist Party (1918–1937)
- Occupation: Revolutionary
- Awards: Order of Lenin; Order of the Red Banner

Moisey Lvovich Rukhimovich (Russian: Моисей Львович Рухимович; October 1889 – July 29, 1938) was a Russian revolutionary and Soviet bureaucrat and politician.

== Biography ==
Born in the family of a locksmith in the village of Kagalnik, Rostov Region. He studied at the Kharkov Institute of Technology. Engaged in revolutionary activities since 1903, in the Social Democratic movement since 1904, was a member of the Bund. He conducted revolutionary work in Rostov-on-Don. In 1906–1909 in exile. Since 1911 he worked in the party organizations of Ukraine. He served in the army in 1914–1917, and was a member of the Russian Social Democratic Labor Party from 1913.

In February – December 1917, he was a member of the Kharkov Committee of the Russian Social Democratic Labour Party (Bolsheviks), Chairman of the Military Section of the Council. In 1917–1918, the Chairman of the Kharkov Military Revolutionary Committee, the Chief of Staff of the Red Guard. In February – April 1918, he was the People's Commissar for Military Affairs of the Donetsk–Krivoy Rog Soviet Republic. In 1918–1919 – Military Commissar of the Central Administration for the formation of the Red Army of the Ukrainian Socialist Soviet Republic. In August–October 1919, the Military Commissar of the 41st Infantry Division. Adjacent to the "Military Opposition". In 1919–1920, a member of the Revolutionary Military Council of the 14th Army.

In 1920–1923, the Chairman of the Donetsk Provincial Executive Committee and the Bakhmut Executive Committee. In 1923–1925, he managed the Donugol Trust, which included all the mines of Donbass. In 1925–1926, Chairman of the Supreme Soviet of the National Economy of the Ukrainian Socialist Soviet Republic. In 1926–1930, Deputy Chairman of the Supreme Soviet of the National Economy of the Soviet Union. In 1930–1931, the People's Commissar of Railways of the Soviet Union. In 1931–1934, the Manager of the Kuzbassugol Trust. In 1934–1936, Deputy People's Commissar of Heavy Industry of the Soviet Union. Since December 8, 1936, the People's Commissar of the Defense Industry of the Soviet Union.

Member of the Central Executive Committee of the Soviet Union of 1–7 convocations. Member of the Central Committee of the All–Union Communist Party (Bolsheviks) (1924–1937), member of the Organizational Bureau of the Central Committee of the All–Union Communist Party (Bolsheviks) (1927–1930).

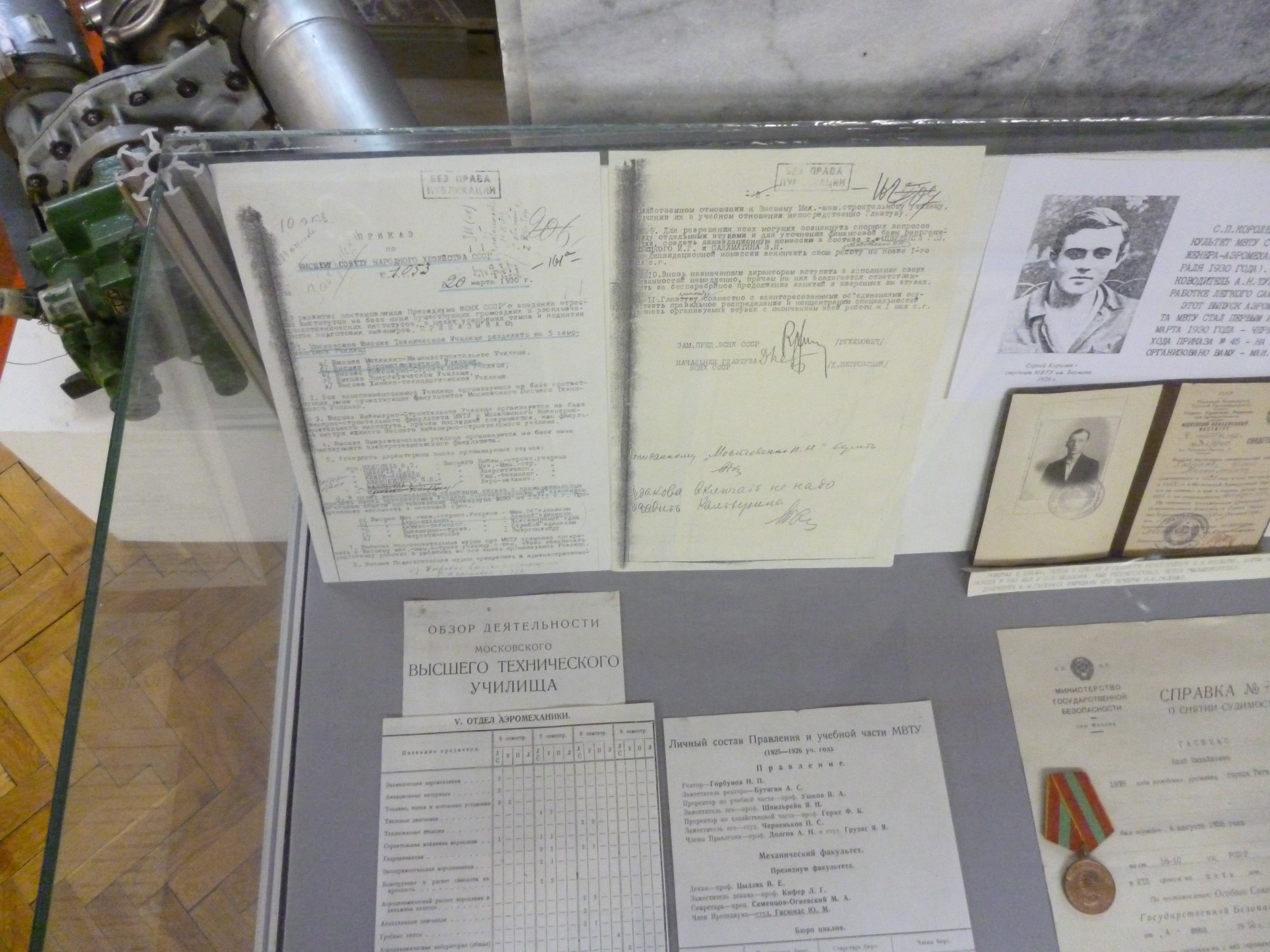
Handwritten notes by Rukhimovich to the document (in the center above)

On October 15, 1937, Rukhimovich was removed from office and arrested the next day. The Military Collegium of the Supreme Court of the Soviet Union sentenced him to death on July 28, 1938, was executed the next day. Under Khrushchev, he was posthumously rehabilitated by the Military Collegium of the Supreme Court of the Soviet Union on March 14, 1956. On March 3, 1956, he was reinstated in the party by the Party Control Committee under the Central Committee of the Communist Party of the Soviet Union.

== Awards ==
- Order of Lenin
- Order of the Red Banner

== Works ==
- Moisey Rukhimovich. The Power of the Soviet Union is Indestructible // Truth – 1937 – February 23
- Moisey Rukhimovich. For the Socialist Reconstruction of Transport. Report at the 5th Plenum of the All–Union Central Council of Trade Unions on January 25, 1931 – Moscow: Moscow Worker, 1931 – Pages 2–34
- Moisey Rukhimovich. Five Year Plan and Training. Report at the 8th Congress of the All–Union Leninist Communist Youth Union – Moscow: Young Guard, 1928 – Pages 7–12

== Bibliography ==
- Prokova L. I. He Was Appreciated by Lenin / L. I. Prokova // "We Swear an Oath...": Collection. Kharkov: Prapor, 1989 – Pages 189–197
- Gavrilenko A. A. Moisey Rukhimovich: Unknown Pages of a Biography / A. A. Gavrilenko // Bulletin of Kharkov University: Problems of the Political History of Ukraine – Kharkov: Basis, 1993 – No. 375 – Pages 72–79
- Gavrilenko O. A., Logvinenko I. A. The Bolshevik Сoup in Kharkov: How It Was // Scientific Notes of the Department of Ukrainian Studies of Kharkov University. No. 1 – Kharkov, 1994 – Pages 41–48
- Ozerskiy Y. A., Gavrilenko O. A. Military Commissioner of the Donetsk–Krivoy Rog Republic // Some Issues of the History of the Ukrainian State – Kharkov: Kharkov Polytechnics Institute of Technology, 1993 – Pages 78–87
- Gavrilenko A. A. Moisey Rukhimovich: Ukrainophile or Ukrainophobe? / A. A. Gavrilenko // Collection of Scientific Works of Graduate Students Kharkov State University (Humanities) – Kharkov, 1992 – Pages 136–140
- Gavrilenko O. A. Moisey Rukhimovich: Personality, Politician, Economic Figure. Dissertation of a Candidate of Historical Sciences. 07.00.01 – History of Public Movements and Political Parties – Dnepropetrovsk, 1994
