= Andrey Andreyevich Andreyev =

Soviet politician (1895–1971)

Andrey Andreyev
- Андрей Андреев
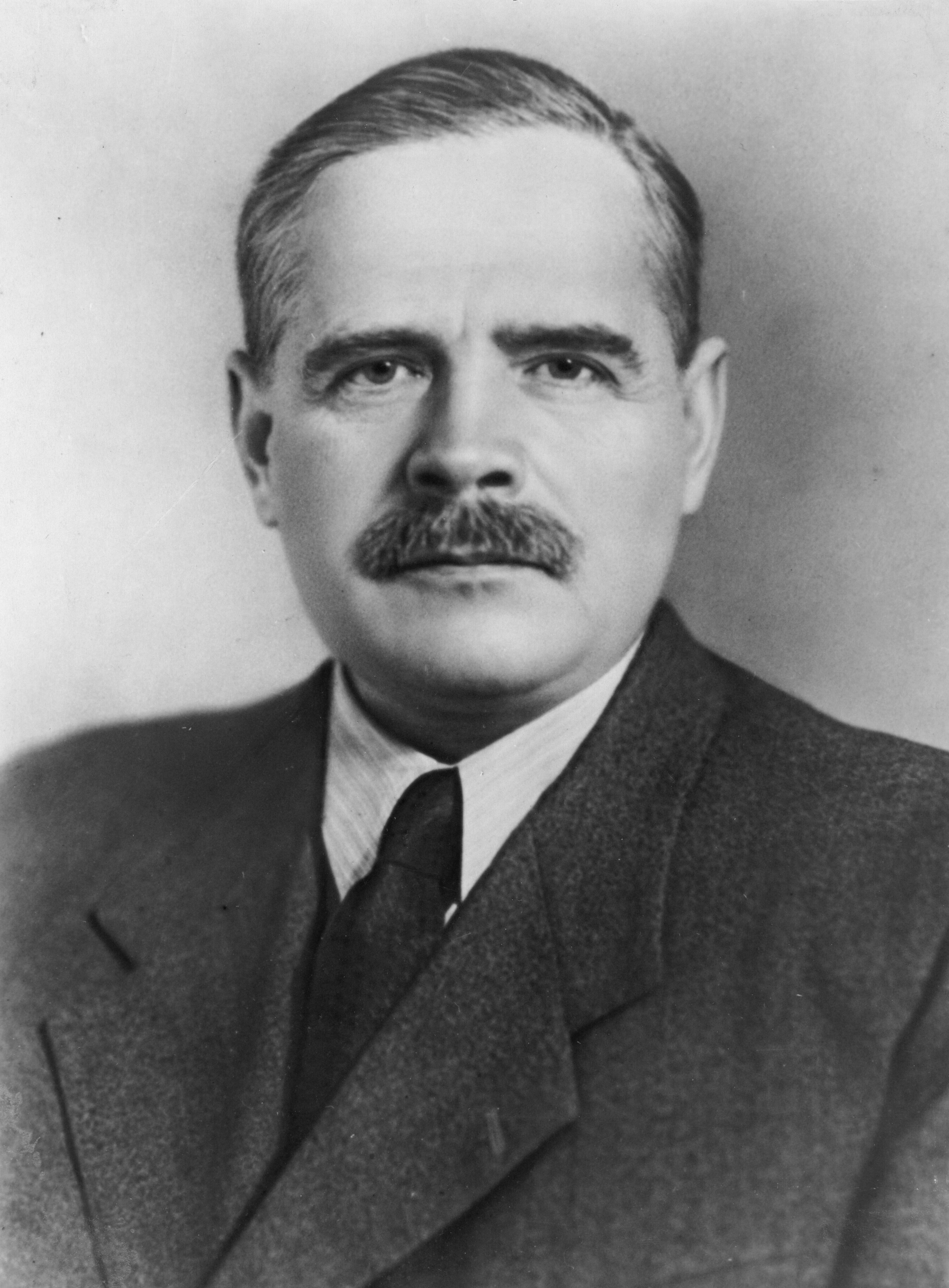
- Andreyev c. 1953

Deputy Chairman of the Council of Ministers of the Soviet Union
- In office 19 March 1946 – 5 March 1953
- Premier: Joseph Stalin

Chairman of the Party Control Commission of the Central Committee
- In office 19 March 1939 – 5 October 1952
- Preceded by: Nikolai Yezhov
- Succeeded by: Matvei Shkiryatov
- In office 1930–1931
- Preceded by: Grigol Ordzhonikidze
- Succeeded by: Jānis Rudzutaks

Personal details
- Born: Andrey Andreyevich Andreyev; 30 October 1895 Kuznetsovo, Sychyovsky Uyezd, Smolensk Governorate, Russian Empire
- Died: 5 December 1971 (aged 76) Moscow, Russian SFSR, Soviet Union
- Resting place: Novodevichy Cemetery
- Citizenship: Soviet
- Party: Communist Party of the Soviet Union (1914–1971)
- Spouse: Dora Khazan-Andreyeva
- Central institution membership: 1932–1952: Full member, 16th, 17th, 18th Politburo; 1926–1930: Candidate member, 14th, 15th, 16th Politburo; 1935–1946: Member, 17th, 18th Secretariat; 1924–1925: Member, 12th, 13th Secretariat; 1935–1946: Full member, 17th, 18th Orgburo; 1922–1928: Full member, 11th, 12th, 13th, 14th, 15th Orgburo; 1922–1961: Full member, 9th, 11th, 12th, 13th, 14th, 15th, 16th, 17th, 18th, 19th, 20th Central Committee; Other offices held: 1943–1946: Minister of Agriculture of the Soviet Union; 1938–1946: Chairman, Soviet of the Union of the Supreme Soviet; 1931–1935: People's Commissar of Communication Routes; 1930–1931:Deputy Chairman of the Council of People's Commissars; 1930—1931: People's Commissar for Workers' and Peasants' Inspectorate

Andrey Andreyevich Andreyev (Russian: Андре́й Андре́евич Андре́ев; 30 October 1895 – 5 December 1971) was a Soviet Communist politician. An Old Bolshevik who rose to power during the rule of Joseph Stalin, he joined the Politburo as a candidate member in 1926 and as a full member in 1932. Andreyev also headed the powerful Central Control Commission of the Communist Party of the Soviet Union from 1930 to 1931, and then again from 1939 until 1952.

In 1952, Andreyev was removed from the Politburo and placed in a largely ceremonial position as a member of the Presidium of the Supreme Soviet.

== Biography ==
=== Early years ===
Andrey Andreyevich Andreyev was born in the Sychyovsky Uyezd of the Smolensk Governorate of the Russian Empire to a peasant family. He left the village at the age of 13 to work as a dishwasher in Moscow. He attended workers' educational courses, and by the time he was 15, he had joined a Marxist circle. He joined the Bolsheviks after settling in Petrograd to work in the Putilov arms factory, in 1914.

During World War I, he worked as a hospital administrator, while carrying on illegal political work. He was a member of the Petrograd committee of the Bolsheviks in 1915–16, and one of the organisers of the wave of strikes that preceded the fall of the Tsar. After the February revolution, he helped found the Petrograd Metal Workers' Union. He was in the crowd that welcomed the Bolshevik leader, Vladimir Lenin on his return from exile in April 1917. At the Bolshevik conference that same month, he was one of the younger delegates who backed Lenin's call for a second revolution.

=== Union leader ===
Andreyev spent the early part of the Russian civil war as a trade union and Communist Party organiser in the Urals, where he oversaw the nationalisation of the factories, and ensured that the new Soviet republic was supplied with metal and food. He was posted in 1919 to Ukraine as the leader of the metal workers' union, and a member of the All-Russian Central Trade Union Council (TUC).

In the latter part of 1919, Lenin came up against heavy opposition from the trade unions, who wanted democratic control of industry, which Lenin believed would undermine efficiency and delay economic recovery. In January 1920, he was outvoted in a meeting of the communist 'fraction' of the All-Russian TUC. Throughout, Andreyev was one of the minority who supported Lenin's line.

His reward was to be appointed head of the railway workers' union, and at the 9th Communist Party Congress in March 1920 he was one of three union leaders, along with Mikhail Tomsky and Janis Rudzutaks, elected to the 19-member Central Committee, which, prior to the creation of the Politburo, was the body that effectively ruled Russia and its former colonies. Aged 24, he was its youngest member. (The second youngest, Nikolai Bukharin, was 31.)

During 1920–21, the Central Committee was split 10–9 over the role of the unions. The minority, led by Leon Trotsky, proposed that they be incorporated in the state; the majority, led by Lenin and including Joseph Stalin, argued for their continued existence, under party control. Andreyev was the only leading trade unionist to support the minority line – surprisingly, in view of his later career. (He was the only former member of that committee apart from Stalin still alive after the Great Purge: all the others who had not died in the meantime were killed.)

Andreyev was dropped from the Central Committee in March 1921, but when the TUC had its next congress, in May 1921, he loyally supported the party leadership against a campaign led by the veteran revolutionary David Riazanov, who called for union leaders to be elected rather than appointed by the party. Tomsky and Rudzutaks were sacked, temporarily, for failing to block this proposal, whilst Andreyev was made a secretary of the TUC, and at the 11th party congress in April 1922, he was restored to membership of the party's Central Committee. He retained his membership for the next 40 years. He was also co-opted onto the Orgburo, which was dominated by Stalin, the newly appointed General Secretary.

In May 1923, Andreyev was a member of the small Communist delegation at the Congress of the Second International. A fellow delegate, the French communist Alfred Rosmer, remembered him as "a friendly and modest companion, who didn't mind us joking about his name".

=== Party official ===
Shortly after Lenin's death, in June 1924, Andreyev was appointed a Secretary of the Central Committee of the Communist Party. From that date Andreyev was a loyal supporter of Stalin and part of the inner core of the Stalinist faction. He was one of five hard line Stalinists who were raised to candidate membership of the Politburo in July 1926, a few months before Trotsky was expelled from the same body.

In 1925, when the People's Commissar for Finance, Grigori Sokolnikov, pointed out that workers' wages were still below their pre-war (1913) level and suggested raising them, Andreyev denounced him for attacking the trade unions and for his 'irresponsible attitude to the workers'.

From January 1928 to December 1930, Andreyev was based in Rostov in south Russia, as First Secretary of the North Caucasus territory party committee. In this capacity, he was responsible for the seeing through the forcible collectivisation of agriculture in one of Russia's main grain-producing regions. At the outset, he seemed hesitant about forcing the pace: as late as October 1929, he forecast that it would be impossible to complete the changeover to collective agriculture before the end of the First five-year plan in 1933. His complaints about the difficulty of achieving the grain deliveries Stalin demanded almost caused a rift, when Stalin lost his temper with Andreyev – but then, unusually, apologised.

By December, Andreyev had committed the regional party to a target of complete collectivisation by the spring 1931. In January 1930, he announced that they had been too modest, and would complete the process during that year. As part of the process, the North Caucasus OGPU was set a quota of 6,000–8,000 'kulaks' to be arrested and executed, and 20,000 to be deported to remote parts of the USSR.

By February, 80 per cent of the rural population of the North Caucasus had been herded onto collective farms, but the result was armed rebellion by thousands of peasants, which was put down by the Red Army, and which forced a partial retreat by the authorities. Within two months, the proportion of peasants on collective farms had fallen to 67 per cent.

In December 1930, Andreyev was recalled to Moscow and appointed Chairman of the Central Control Commission, which was responsible for party discipline, and chairman of Rabkrin. In September 1931, he volunteered to take the additional post of People's Commissar for Transport, after the Politburo had heard a report on the serious state of the railways. He relinquished the chairmanship of the Control Commission on 4 February 1932, when he became a full member of the Politburo.

In March 1935, Andreyev was reappointed a secretary of the Central Committee, in the wake of the assassination of Sergey Kirov. On 3 April 1935, he was co-opted onto the Orgburo, to chair its meetings, and was put in charge of the Industrial department of the Communist Party.

=== Role in the 1930s purges ===
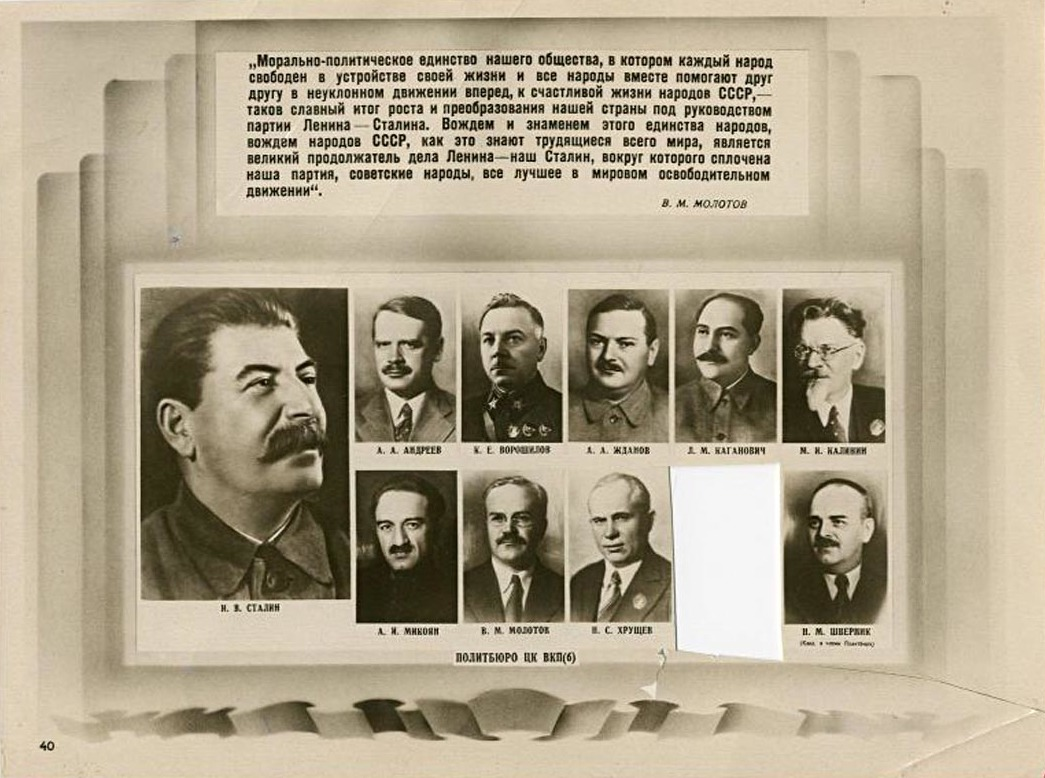
Andreyev (top row, far left) with other members of the Politburo of the Communist Party of the Soviet Union, 1937. Lavrentiy Beria's portrait has been cut out.

During the Great Purge, when it was common to send high-ranking party officials from Moscow to the provinces to oversee mass expulsions and arrests of provincial communist party members, Andreyev "became the unchallengeable master of these murderous roadshows". Between June and September 1937, he travelled to Voronezh, Chelyabinsk, Sverdlovsk, Kursk, Saratov, Kuybyshev, Tashkent, Stalinabad, Rostov and Krasnodar. Sometimes, he accused local party leaders of arresting the wrong people, who were released. More often, his arrival meant arrests and executions. He always stayed in telegram communication with Stalin, who always approved all his recommended lists of party members to be expelled and/or arrested.

Early in January 1937, he arrived in Rostov to organise the removal of Boris Sheboldayev, his successor as regional party boss in the renamed Azov-Black Sea territory, who was accused of excessive leniency because he had allowed former oppositionists such as Alexander Beloborodov and Nikolai Glebov-Avilov to hold responsible jobs in the region. Sheldboldayev temporarily saved himself by apologising, and was transferred to another post, only to be arrested later and shot.

In Saratov, where he arrived on 20 July, his main target was the local head of the NKVD Yakov Agranov, who was arrested and shot, along with the second secretary of the regional communist party and others. Some people whom Agranov had had arrested were released. At the same time, Andreyev identified 20 employees of the Machine Tractor Stations who were "working very obstructively". Stalin replied with a telegram the same day, saying they should all be shot. In total, in the wake of his visit, 430 people were shot.

In Kuybyshev, he ordered the local party boss, Pavel Postyshev, to step up the hunt for hidden enemies, after which Postyshev disbanded most of the local party branches and had 3,300 party members arrested. By the end of 1937, it was decided that Postyshev had gone too far, and Andreyev was assigned the job of collecting names of people wrongfully expelled from the Kuibyshev party, after which Postyshev was arrested and shot.

When Andreyev arrived in Tashkent, in September 1937, the founder of the Uzbek communist party, Faizullah Khojaev, and seven others were denounced as enemies of the people. Four days later, on 12 September, the First Secretary of the Uzbek communist party Akmal Ikramov was expelled from the party. He was arrested two weeks later. In the ensuing purge, 430 people were executed. Andreyev then moved on to Stalinabad, in Tajikistan, where he had 344 shot.

In March 1938, an official of the USSR Writers' Union approached Andreyev about finding work for the poet Osip Mandelstam, who was in Moscow, but unemployed. Andreyev refused. Mandelstam was arrested and died in the gulag.

In October 1940, he issued an order that a recently published book of poems by Anna Akhmatova was banned and all copies were to be seized. In 1940, Akhmatova was suddenly granted official recognition, having been prevented from publishing any of her work for 15 years. Andreyev's order meant that "Akhmatova's nine months a published poet again had come to an end".

In November 1938, Andreyev supervised the changes at the headquarters of the NKVD, in which Lavrentiy Beria was confirmed as its new head in place of Nikolai Yezhov, who was arrested and shot. Also in November, he chaired a session of the Central Committee of Komsomol, the communist youth league, at which most of its leaders were sacked, and later arrested and shot.

=== Later career ===
In 1939, Andreyev resumed his former position as Chairman of the Central Commission, combining that with his continued role as party secretary and Politburo member. He was also Chairman of the Soviet of the Union from 1938 until 1946. Despite this array of titles, there were signs that he was being supplanted within Stalin's inner circle by Georgi Malenkov, Nikita Khrushchev, Nikolai Voznesensky and other rising stars. During the war, he was not included in the emergency State Defense Committee (GOKO), or involved front line duties, but was given responsibility for transport and food supplies, as deputy chairman of the transport sub-committee of GOKO, as USSR People's Commissar for Agriculture, 1943–46, and as chairman of the Kolkhoz (collective farms) Central Council from December 1943 to February 1950.

After the war, Andreyev appeared to recover his position. In March 1946, he was appointed a Deputy Chairman of the USSR Council of Ministers, responsible for agriculture, while Malenkov was temporarily removed from his role as party secretary, and a protégé of Andreyev, Nikolai Patolichev was appointed head of the party organisation department. In March 1947, Khrushchev was temporarily ousted from control of the Ukrainian communist party, and Patolichev was sent to Kiev apparently as the party secretary in charge of agriculture. During 1948, Andreyev ran the investigation which brought down Voznesensky, whom he accused of losing 526 documents from Gosplan. "This invented case was one of Andreyev's last achievements". It marked the start of the Leningrad case.

However, by the summer of 1947, both Malenkov and Khrushchev had recovered their positions, while Andreyev was ill. His doctors prescribed cocaine, to which he became addicted. In December 1949, he was replaced by Khrushchev as the party secretary in charge of agriculture. Although still nominally a member of the Politburo, he was in reality excluded from the party leadership in what Khrushchev later described, somewhat hypocritically, as one of Stalin's "most unbridled acts of willfulness".

According to Sergo Mikoyan, son of Andreyev's contemporary and colleague, Anastas Mikoyan, around 1950 Andreyev asked Stalin for permission to retire from office, because he had become nearly totally deaf, as even hearing aids hardly helped him - making him one of the few high-ranking communists in Stalin's time to leave office alive, without being arrested.

=== Family ===
Andreyev was married to Dora Khazan (1894–1961), who was a student along with Stalin's second wife, Nadezhda Alliluyeva, at an industrial academy. Together the couple had two children, a son named Vladimir (born 1919) and a daughter Natalya (born 1922–2015). Dora Khazan worked in Stalin's secretariat for a time. She was arrested in 1948. It was not unknown for Politburo members to continue in high offices while their wives were in the gulag: the same happened to Vyacheslav Molotov, Mikhail Kalinin and Otto Kuusinen, among others.

He later married Zinaida Ivanovna Desyatova. They had two daughters, Tatyana and Valentina. He has three grandchildren – Kochergin Ilya N., Kharlamov and Ivan V. Kharlamov Xenia Vyacheslavovna.

=== Death and legacy ===
Andreyev was formally removed from the Politburo, after 20 years, at the 19th party congress in October 1952. After Stalin's death, he was briefly brought back as Chairman of the Central Commission, in 1954–56, and was made a member of the Presidium of the Supreme Soviet, a largely ceremonial position. Because he was no threat to Khrushchev or his successors, his role in the great purges was generally kept quiet. However, after he died, on 5 December 1971, despite his historical importance and decades of tenure in the top ranks of Soviet government officials, Andreyev's funeral was not attended by either Leonid Brezhnev, the General Secretary of the CPSU, or Alexei Kosygin, the Chairman of the Council of Ministers.

Andreyev is remembered for having loved the music of Tchaikovsky, mountaineering, and nature photography.

During his life Andreyev was four times awarded the Order of Lenin, the Order of the October Revolution, and other awards. He is the namesake of the AA-20 locomotive, which he is credited for sponsoring as the head of the Soviet railway system from 1931 to 1935.

== See also ==
- Outline of the Russian Revolution and Civil War
- Bibliography of the Russian Revolution and Civil War
- Bibliography of Stalinism and the Soviet Union
- Index of Old Bolsheviks
- Index of articles related to the Russian Revolution and Civil War
