= Nikolay Komarov (politician) =

Russian Soviet politician

- Николай Комаров
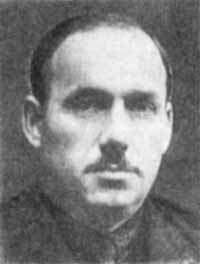

Chairman of the Leningrad Soviet
- In office 26 March 1926 – 10 January 1930
- Preceded by: Grigory Zinoviev
- Succeeded by: Ivan Kodatsky

People's Commissar of Communal Services of the RSFSR
- In office 20 July 1931 – July 1937
- Premier: Daniil Sulimov
- Preceded by: Position established
- Succeeded by: Ivan Kabanov

Personal details
- Born: Fyodor Yevgeniyevich Sobinov; 27 November 1889 Tver, Russian Empire
- Died: 27 November 1937 (aged 48) Moscow, Russian SFSR, Soviet Union
- Party: All-Union Communist Party (Bolsheviks) (1918–1937)
- Other political affiliations: Russian Social Democratic Labour Party (Bolsheviks) (1909–1918)

Nikolai Pavlovich Komarov (Russian: Николай Павлович Комаров; born Fyodor Yevgenyevich Sobinov; Фёдор Евгеньевич Собинов; 27 November 1886 – 27 November 1937) was a Soviet Russian politician, statesman and Communist Party official.

== Biography ==
=== Early life and career ===
Komarov was the son of a poor peasant family and graduated from the local parish school. He began to live in St. Petersburg from 1902 and worked in different factories and completed his studies.

A participant of the Revolution of 1905, at the time he was a member of the Socialist Revolutionary Party but later joined the Bolshevik faction of the Russian Social Democratic Labour Party in 1909. In 1912 he organised a protest as a response to the Lena massacre.

He was a member of the RSDLP (b) regional committee from 1915 to 1917 and was arrested for revolutionary activities in 1916 and later sentenced to 10 years of hard labour.

After the February Revolution he was released and became a member of the RSDLP (b) committee of Petrograd, a deputy of then Petrograd Soviet as well as member Vyborg regional committee of the RSDLP (b).

=== October Revolution and Civil War ===
Komarov was one of the organisers of the assault of the Winter Palace. From November 1917 he was chairman of the Petrograd Military Revolutionary Tribunal and in 1918 he became comrade chairman. From February to March 1918 he was deputy chairman of the Revolutionary Defence Committee of Petrograd.

In 1918 hs Joined the newly formed Red Army and became a commissar on the Eastern Front. Then he became chairman of the Board of State Stores and Stationery in Petrograd and from the fall of 1918 to January 1919, he headed the department of internal trade of the Economic Council of the Union of Communes of the Northern Region.

From January 1919 Komarov served in the organs of Cheka and was in charge of the special department of the Cheka of the Union of Communes of the Northern Region. In In 1920 – head of the secret-operational unit of the Petrograd provincial Cheka.

From September 1920 to 14 April 1921 he was Chairman of the Petrograd Provincial Cheka, at the same time he was Head of the Special Department for the Protection of the Border with Finland and Implemented the policy of the Red Terror.

=== In the Soviet Union ===
From 15 April 1921 to 1925 he was Secretary of the Petrograd Provincial Executive Committee. From 26 March 1926 to 10 January 1930, Chairman of the Leningrad Provincial (from November 1927 – Regional) Executive Committee. At the same time he was a member of the North-West Bureau of the Central Committee of the All-Union Communist Party (b) (from April 1922 to February 1927, including from 3 November to 10 December 1925 – the secretary of the Bureau), a member of the Secretariat (November 1925 – February 1927) and Acting Head of the Organizational Department (February 1926 – February 1927) of the Leningrad Provincial Committee of the CPSU (b); member of the Revolutionary Military Council of the Leningrad Military District (1926–1929).

Komarov was a member of the Organizational Bureau of the Central Committee of the RCP (b) in 1921, and a Member of the Central Committee of the RCP (b) / VKP (b) (1921–1922; 1923–1934).

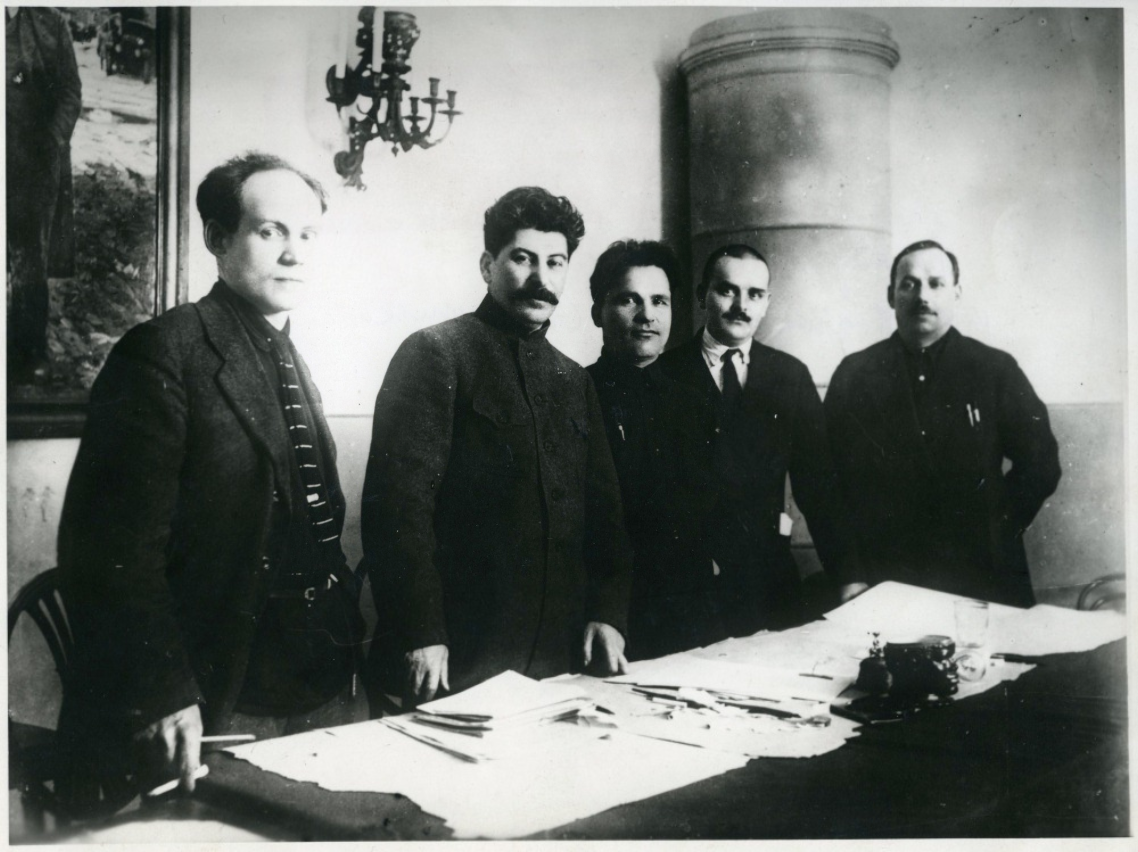
From left to right: Nikolai Antipov, Joseph Stalin, Sergei Kirov, Nikolai Shvernik, and Nikolay Komarov at the Fifteenth Leningrad Regional Party Conference. 1926

At first one of the closest associates of Grigory Zinoviev, he later was at conflict with him and did not support his opposition.

In November 1929, together with a group of Leningrad party workers he opposed Sergei Kirov, accusing him of collaborating with the "left bourgeois press" in 1917. Their accusation was examined in a meeting of the Politburo and Presidium of the Central Control Commission and were found to be defamatory. Komarov was then sent to work outside of Leningrad and was relieved from him position as Chairman of the Leningrad Soviet and secretary of the regional committee.

From 1930 he was sent to work in Moscow at the Supreme Council of National Economy (1930–1931) and became a member of the Presidium of the Supreme Council of National Economy and chairman of Soyuzstroy. From 20 July 1931 he was appointed People's Commissar of Communal Services of the RSFSR, at the same time Deputy Chairman of the All-Union Council of Municipal Economy and chairman of the Board of the Leningrad Rural Consumer Society.

== Repression ==
In June 1937 Komarov was arrested, expelled from the Central Committee and the Party. On November 27, by the decision of the Military Collegium of the USSR Supreme Court was sentenced to be shot for his participation in the Trotskyite–Zinovievite anti-Soviet organisation and his sentence was carried out in the same day.

On 17 March 1956 Komarov was rehabilitated by the decision of the Military Collegium of the USSR Supreme Court. On 22 March 1956 he was reinstated in the party by the Party Control Committee of the Central Committee of the Communist Party of the Soviet Union.
