= Politburo of the 16th Congress of the All-Union Communist Party (Bolsheviks) =

Politburo of the 16th Congress

13 July 1930 – 10 February 1934

Leadership
- General Secretary: Joseph Stalin
- Second Secretary: Vyacheslav Molotov (Jul.– Dec. 1930); Lazar Kaganovich (1930–1934)
- Politburo: 12 full & 5 candidates
- Secretariat: 5 full & 2 candidates
- Orgburo: 11 full & 4 candidates

The Politburo of the 16th Congress of the All-Union Communist Party (Bolsheviks) was in session from 1930 to 1934.

== Composition ==
=== Members ===
Members of the Politburo of the 16th Congress of the All-Union Communist Party (Bolsheviks)
Name	Cyrillic	15th POL	17th POL	Birth	Death	PM	Ethnicity	Gender	Portrait
Andrey Andreyev	Андрей Андреев	By-election	Reelected	1895	1971	1914	Russian	Male	
Lazar Kaganovich	Лазарь Каганович	Candidate	Reelected	1893	1991	1911	Ukrainian Jew	Male	
Mikhail Kalinin	Михаил Калинин	Old	Reelected	1875	1946	1898	Russian	Male	
Sergey Kirov	Серге́й Ки́ров	Candidate	Reelected	1886	1934	1904	Russian	Male	
Stanislav Kosior	Станислав Косиор	Candidate	Reelected	1889	1939	1907	Polish	Male	Stanislav Kosior
Valerian Kuybyshev	Валериан Куйбышев	New	Reelected	1888	1935	1904	Russian	Male	
Vyacheslav Molotov	Вячеслав Молотов	Old	Reelected	1890	1986	1906	Russian	Male	
Grigol Ordzhonikidze	Григо́рий Орджоники́дзе	By-election	Reelected	1886	1937	1903	Georgian	Male	
Jānis Rudzutaks	Ян Рудзутак	Old	Relieved	1887	1938	1905	Latvian	Male	Jānis Rudzutaks
Alexei Rykov	Алексей Рыков	Old	Relieved	1881	1938	1898	Russian	Male	Alexei Rykov
Joseph Stalin	Ио́сиф Ста́лин	Old	Reelected	1878	1953	1898	Georgian	Male	
Kliment Voroshilov	Климент Ворошилов	Old	Reelected	1881	1969	1903	Russian	Male	

=== Candidates ===
Candidate Members of the Politburo of the 16th Congress of the All-Union Communist Party (Bolsheviks)
Name	Cyrillic	15th POL	17th POL	Birth	Death	PM	Ethnicity	Gender	Portrait
Andrey Andreyev	Андрей Андреев	Candidate	Relieved	1895	1971	1914	Russian	Male	
Vlas Chubar	Влас Чубар	Candidate	Candidate	1891	1939	1907	Ukrainian	Male	Vlas Chubar
Anastas Mikoyan	Анаста́с Микоя́н	Candidate	Member	1895	1978	1915	Armenian	Male	
Grigory Petrovsky	Григо́рій Петро́вський	Candidate	Candidate	1878	1958	1898	Ukrainian	Male	Grigory Petrovsky
Sergei Syrtsov	Сергей Сырцов	Candidate	Relieved	1893	1937	1913	Russian	Male	
