= Politburo of the 15th Congress of the All-Union Communist Party (Bolsheviks) =

15th Politburo
- Politburo, 14th Congress ← → Politburo, 16th Congress
- Duration: 19 December 1927 – 13 July 1930

The Politburo of the 15th Congress of the All-Union Communist Party (Bolsheviks) was in session from 1927 to 1930.

== Composition ==
=== Members ===
Members of the Politburo of the 15th Congress of the All-Union Communist Party (Bolsheviks)
Name	Cyrillic	14th POL	16th POL	Birth	Death	PM	Ethnicity	Gender	Portrait
Nikolai Bukharin	Никола́й Буха́рин	Old	Relieved	1888	1938	1906	Russian	Male	
Mikhail Kalinin	Михаил Калинин	Old	Reelected	1875	1946	1898	Russian	Male	
Vyacheslav Molotov	Вячеслав Молотов	Old	Reelected	1890	1986	1906	Russian	Male	
Jānis Rudzutaks	Ян Рудзутак	Old	Reelected	1887	1938	1906	Latvian	Male	
Alexei Rykov	Алексей Рыков	Old	Reelected	1881	1938	1899	Russian	Male	
Joseph Stalin	Ио́сиф Ста́лин	Old	Reelected	1878	1953	1898	Georgian	Male	
Mikhail Tomsky	Михаил Томский	Old	Not	1880	1936	1904	Russian	Male	
Kliment Voroshilov	Климент Ворошилов	Old	Reelected	1881	1969	1903	Russian	Male	

=== Candidates ===
Candidate Members of the Politburo of the 15th Congress of the All-Union Communist Party (Bolsheviks)
Name	Cyrillic	14th POL	16th POL	Birth	Death	PM	Ethnicity	Gender	Portrait
Andrey Andreyev	Андрей Андреев	Candidate	Candidate	1895	1971	1914	Russian	Male	
Karl Bauman	Карл Бауман	By-election	Not	1892	1937	1907	Latvian	Male	
Vlas Chubar	Влас Чубар	Candidate	Candidate	1891	1939	1907	Ukrainian	Male	
Lazar Kaganovich	Лазарь Каганович	Candidate	Member	1893	1991	1911	Ukrainian Jew	Male	
Sergey Kirov	Серге́й Ки́ров	Candidate	Member	1886	1934	1904	Russian	Male	
Stanislav Kosior	Станислав Косиор	Candidate	Member	1889	1939	1907	Polish	Male	
Anastas Mikoyan	Анастас Микоян	Candidate	Candidate	1895	1978	1915	Armenian	Male	
Grigory Petrovsky	Григо́рій Петро́вський	Candidate	Candidate	1878	1958	1898	Ukrainian	Male	a bearded man with wavy hair, wearing glasses and what seems to be a suit, a white tie, and a black and white dotted shirt
Sergei Syrtsov	Сергей Сырцов	New	Candidate	1893	1937	1913	Russian	Male	
Nikolai Uglanov	Николай Угланов	Candidate	Relieved	1886	1937	1907	Russian	Male	
