= Politburo of the 14th Congress of the All-Union Communist Party (Bolsheviks) =

Politburo of the 14th Congress

1 January 1926 – 19 December 1927

The Politburo of the 14th Congress of the All-Union Communist Party (Bolsheviks) was in session from 1 January 1926 to 19 December 1927.

== Composition ==
=== Members ===
Members of the Politburo of the 14th Congress of the All-Union Communist Party (Bolsheviks)
Name	Cyrillic	13th POL	15th POL	Birth	Death	PM	Ethnicity	Gender	Portrait
Nikolai Bukharin	Никола́й Буха́рин	Old	Reelected	1888	1938	1906	Russian	Male	
Mikhail Kalinin	Михаил Калинин	Candidate	Reelected	1875	1946	1898	Russian	Male	
Vyacheslav Molotov	Вячеслав Молотов	Candidate	Reelected	1890	1986	1906	Russian	Male	
Jānis Rudzutaks	Ян Рудзутак	Promoted	Reelected	1887	1938	1906	Latvian	Male	
Alexei Rykov	Алексей Рыков	Old	Reelected	1881	1938	1899	Russian	Male	
Joseph Stalin	Ио́сиф Ста́лин	Old	Reelected	1878	1953	1898	Georgian	Male	
Mikhail Tomsky	Михаил Томский	Old	Reelected	1880	1936	1904	Russian	Male	
Leon Trotsky	Лев Тро́цкий	Old	Relieved	1879	1940	1917	Jewish	Male	
Kliment Voroshilov	Климент Ворошилов	Old	Reelected	1881	1969	1903	Russian	Male	
Grigory Zinoviev	Григо́рий Зино́вьев	Old	Relieved	1883	1936	1901	Jewish	Male	

=== Candidates ===
Candidate Members of the Politburo of the 14th Congress of the All-Union Communist Party (Bolsheviks)
Name	Cyrillic	13th POL	15th POL	Birth	Death	PM	Ethnicity	Gender	Portrait
Andrey Andreyev	Андрей Андреев	By-election	Reelected	1895	1971	1914	Russian	Male	
Vlas Chubar	Влас Чубар	By-election	Reelected	1891	1939	1907	Ukrainian	Male	
Felix Dzerzhinsky	Фе́ликс Дзержи́нский	Candidate	Died	1877	1926	1906	Polish	Male	
Lazar Kaganovich	Лазарь Каганович	By-election	Reelected	1893	1991	1911	Jewish	Male	
Lev Kamenev	Лев Ка́менев	Member	Relieved	1883	1936	1901	Jewish- Russian (Note: His father was Jewish and his mother Russian)	Male	
Sergey Kirov	Серге́й Ки́ров	By-election	Reelected	1886	1934	1904	Russian	Male	
Anastas Mikoyan	Анастас Микоян	By-election	Reelected	1895	1978	1915	Armenian	Male	
Grigol Ordzhonikidze	Григо́рий Орджоники́дзе	By-election	Relieved	1886	1937	1903	Georgian	Male	
Grigory Petrovsky	Григо́рій Петро́вський	New	Reelected	1878	1958	1898	Ukrainian	Male	a bearded man with wavy hair, wearing glasses and what seems to be a suit, a white tie, and a black and white dotted shirt
Jānis Rudzutaks	Ян Рудзутак	Candidate	Promoted	1887	1938	1906	Latvian	Male	
Nikolai Uglanov	Николай Угланов	New	Reelected	1886	1937	1907	Russian	Male	
