= Vishnyakovo =

Vishnyakovo Вишняково
- Village
- Location within Vladimir Oblast Location within Russia
- Coordinates: 56°39′N 38°23′E
- Country: Russia
- Region: Vladimir Oblast
- District: Alexandrovsky District
- Time zone: UTC+3:00

Vishnyakovo (Russian: Вишняково) is a rural locality (a village) in Krasnoplamenskoye Rural Settlement, Alexandrovsky District, Vladimir Oblast, Russia. The population was 11 as of 2010. There is 1 street.

== Geography ==
Vishnyakovo is located 58 km northwest of Alexandrov (the district's administrative centre) by road. Leninskaya Sloboda is the nearest rural locality.
