= Krucha =

Village in Mogilev Region, Belarus

Coordinates: 54°15′N 29°32′E

Krucha (Belarusian: Круча, romanized: Kruča; Russian: Круча) is a village in Kruhlaye District, Mogilev Region, Belarus.

== History ==
On October 10, 1941, during the Operation Barbarossa, the entire Jewish population of Krucha was rounded up and shot. In total 150 men, women and children were murdered.

This particular atrocity was committed by a regular Wehrmacht unit acting on its own initiative; it was not the work of the SS and its mobile killing units. The killings had been carried out by the 3rd Company, 691st Regiment, 339th Infantry Division on orders from the 1st Battalion commander, Major Alfred Commichau.
