= Konstantin Gey =

Russian Communist functionary

- Константин Гей
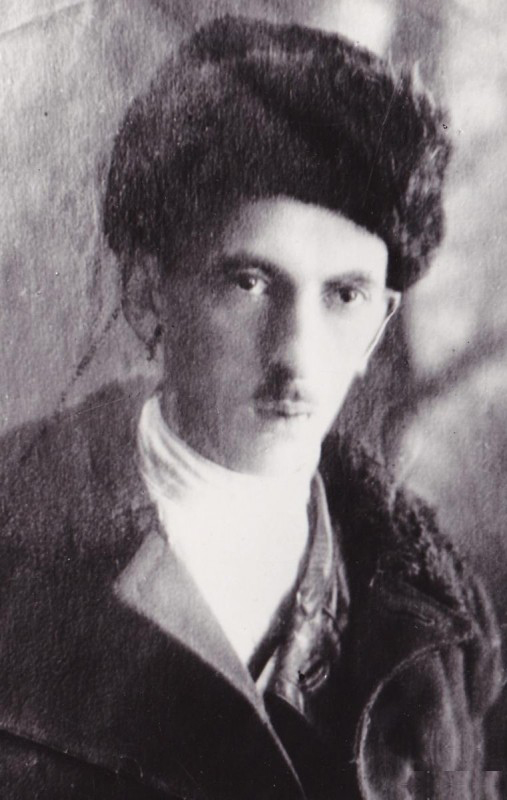

First Secretary of the Communist Party of Byelorussia
- In office 3 January 1930 – 18 January 1932
- Preceded by: Yan Gamarnik
- Succeeded by: Nikolai Gikalo

Personal details
- Born: 1896 Saint Petersburg, Russian Empire
- Died: 25 February 1939 (aged 42–43) Moscow, Russian Soviet Federative Socialist Republic, Soviet Union
- Resting place: Donskoye Cemetery
- Party: All-Union Communist Party (b) (1916–1937)
- Other political affiliations: Communist Party of Byelorussia

Konstantin Veniaminovich Gey (Russian: Константи́н Вениами́нович Гей; 1896 – February 25, 1939) was a Russian Communist Party functionary of Estonian origin, a participant in the Russian Revolution of 1917 and Soviet politician. Gey was instrumental in securing Soviet control in the city of Pskov and was a candidate member of the Bolshevik Central Committee from 1924 until 1934. He was arrested in 1938 and executed by shooting in 1939. He was posthumously rehabilitated in 1956.

== Early years ==
Gey was born into the family of a German father and a Russian teacher in St. Petersburg in 1896. His father Veniamin-Johann Gey came to Russia in the early 1870s, received a higher education, and was appointed to the post of superintendent of Pskov gymnasiums. Konstantin graduated from the Pskov gymnasium, together with his brother Georgy.

== Revolutionary activities ==
There were five children in the family, all of whom later joined the RSDLP. Konstantin joined the Bolshevik Party in 1916. He was chair of the Military Revolutionary Committee of the Pskov province in 1917–1918, and then chair of the provincial executive committee.

== Soviet career ==
By 1925 he had become a member of Stalin's inner circle, the head of the organizational and distribution department of the Central Committee of the All-Union Communist Party of Bolsheviks.

From January 1930 to January 1932 he was the First Secretary of the Central Committee of the Communist Party of Byelorussia, then in 1932–1934 he was secretary of the Moscow Regional Committee of the All-Union Communist Party of Bolsheviks. Gey was demoted from the Central Committee in 1934.

In 1934–1938 he was a member of the Soviet Control Commission, Commissioner for Uzbekistan and the Gorky Region. There is no evidence of direct participation in the Great Terror. By the summer of 1938, he had retired.

He was arrested on October 2, 1938. On February 25, 1939, he was executed by shooting by sentence of the Military Collegium of the Supreme Court of the USSR. He was posthumously rehabilitated in 1956.

A street in Pskov bears Gey's name.
