= Pyotr Zalutsky =

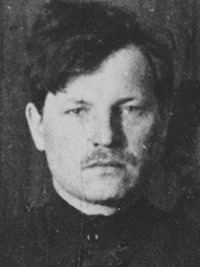
Zalutsky in 1919

Pyotr Antonovich Zalutsky (Russian: Пётр Антонович Залутский) (February 1887 – January 10, 1937) was a Russian Bolshevik revolutionary and Communist Party organiser, who was executed for his involvement in the United Opposition.

== Early career ==
Pyotr Zalutsky was the son of a peasant, born in Krucha, in the Mogilev province of Belarus. He joined the revolutionary movement as a teenager in 1904, took part in the 1905 revolution, and joined the Russian Social Democratic Labour Party in 1907. He worked for the party illegally in Vladivostok, before moving to St. Petersburg in 1911, where he worked in a factory. As a member of the Petersburg Bolshevik organization, he helped organize distribution of the illegal newspapers Pravda and Zvezda.

At the time of the February Revolution, Zalutsky was sharing an apartment with Vyacheslav Molotov, Stalin and Ivar Smilga. The two of them, with Alexander Shliapnikov assumed leadership of the Bolshevik organisation in Petrograd (St Petersburg), and launched Pravda as a legal publication. They advocated the immediate overthrow of the Provisional Government, chaired by Prince Lvov, and the transfer of power to the soviets. They were overruled when two more senior Bolsheviks, Stalin and Lev Kamenev returned from Siberia in March – though Stalin moved into the apartment that Zalutsky and Molotov shared. When Vladimir Lenin returned from exile abroad three weeks later, he backed the hard line that Zalutsky had taken.

Zalutsky was a political commissar with the Red Army during the Russian Civil War. In 1921, he was appointed secretary of the Petrograd committee of the Communist Party of the Soviet Union (CPSU), and a member of the Orgburo. In 1922–25, he was secretary the party organisation in the Ural region. He was a member of the Central Committee of the Communist Party of the Soviet Union in 1923–25 In 1925, he was recalled to Leningrad (St Petersburg) as secretary of the party organisation. Petrograd (St was elected to the Central Committee.

== United Opposition ==
Zalutsky was a political ally of Grigory Zinoviev, the Leningrad party boss who was a member of the triumvirate who assumed control while Lenin was terminally ill, in 1923. The triumvirate was at first united in its hostility to Leon Trotsky and the Left Opposition within the party. In 1924, Zalutsky wrote a pamphlet which called for Trotsky to be expelled from the CPSU, a position which even Stalin opposed at the time as too extreme.

But during 1925, the triumvirate split, as Zinoviev and Kamenev opposed what they regarded as Stalin's turn to the right, and formed the United Opposition with Trotsky. In October 1925, a party member named Leonov, who may have been working secretly for the Stalin faction, claimed to have been shocked to hear Zalutsky denounce the communist party leadership in private conversation for "creating a bourgeois state" and a "kingdom of peasant narrow-mindedness", treating Leningrad as a 'province', and working to bring about a "Thermidor", while likening Stalin to August Bebel, the German Marxist who tried to take a middle position between communists and social democrats. This case was referred to the Central Control Commission, and the Leningrad party committee received orders from Moscow to remove Zalutsky from his position as the provincial party secretary.

During the Fourteenth Party Congress, in December 1925, Zalutsky called for Stalin to be removed from his post as General Secretary, accusing him of violating 'Leninist norms' party life. He was removed from the Central Committee at the end of the congress. In December 1927, he was expelled from the CPSU, with other members of the United Opposition, but in June 1928, he joined other members of the former Zinoviev faction in submitting to the party line in order to have his party membership restored. In 1928–34, Zalutsky chairman of the Lower Volga economic council, as head of a power plant, and then as manager of the Soyuzpromstroymashina ( All-Union Industrial machines) Trust, Moscow.

== Arrest and death ==
Police raided Zalutsky's home on the night of 8–9 December 1934, a week after the assassination of the Leningrad party leader Sergei Kirov and seized oppositionist literature dating back to 1926. He was arrested that same day, and expelled from the communist party, for the second time, on 15 December. But near the end of that month it was announced that there was insufficient evidence to charge him, and that he would be sent into administrative exile.

In fact, he was tried in secret on 16 January, accused of belonging to the so-called 'Leningrad Counter-revolutionary group of Safarov and others, and sentenced to five years in prison. Though his name was not mentioned when Zinoviev, Kamenev went on trial, in the first of the Moscow show trials in August 1936, he was rearrested in a labour camp on 18 November 1936, tried in secret by the Military Collegium of the USSR Supreme Court on January 10, 1937, and shot the same day.

The criminal case against Zalutsky was overturned on 21 June 1962. On 12 August 1987, Pravda announced that his party membership had been posthumously restored.
