= 13th Congress of the Russian Communist Party (Bolsheviks) =

1924 meeting of Soviet delegates

The 13th Congress of the Russian Communist Party (Bolsheviks) was held during 23–31 May 1924 in Moscow. Of the delegates attending, 748 had voting rights, and 416 had consultative rights. The congress elected the 13th Central Committee.

This congress was the Russian Communist Party (Bolsheviks)' first to take place after the death of Vladimir Lenin, and represents a transition between the Lenin and Joseph Stalin regimes. It was also the first confrontation between the Left Opposition (led by Leon Trotsky) and the "troika" (led by Stalin, Grigory Zinoviev, and Lev Kamenev).

== Background ==
By the time of Lenin's death on 21 January 1924, the New Economic Policy (NEP) had produced some economic stability after the famines and crises that had plagued the post-Civil War Soviet economy, such as the "sales crisis" of 1922. The posthumous cult of Lenin became a strategic tool for various Party leaders vying for the leadership. Party membership expanded by more than half during the February "Lenin Enrollment," while Stalin gave a series of lectures later titled Foundations of Leninism. Even though Stalin had been condemned as "too rude and... intolerable" and recommended for dismissal by the late Lenin in his "Last Testament," Stalin nonetheless successfully retained his position as General Secretary and crafted a powerful public association with Lenin's personality cult. Stalin's supporters used Trotsky's former disputes with Lenin to condemn him, and his theory of "permanent revolution" would become the main object of attack in the great theoretical debates following the 13th Party Congress.

== Discussions ==
Among the many issues that dominated the 13th Party Congress, the factional split between the Left Opposition and the "troika" was a major divider. Trotsky and the Left Opposition argued that world revolution was required for the success of socialism, since the Soviet Union could not survive on its own without any aid from Western economies. On the other hand, Stalin, Zinoviev, and Kamenev of the "troika" argued that the Politburo should proceed to organize socialism on a national scale, a policy known as "socialism in one country." On 27 May, Stalin declared Trotsky's line a "petty-bourgeois deviation."

Lenin's "Letter to the Congress" was also read out loud to the 13th Party Congress, and among its criticisms of the different leading personalities of the Politburo, the most condemning was of Stalin. Nonetheless, the Congress chose not to publish this letter, and Stalin retained his post as General-Secretary until his death in 1953.

== Aftermath ==
The 13th Party Congress marked the beginning of the Stalinist era, and the factionalism that emerged set the stage for the next five years, during which further struggles would emerge between factions over Soviet and international policy.

== See also ==
- Lenin's Testament
