= Nikolai Uglanov =

Russian-Soviet politician and statesman

- Николай Угланов
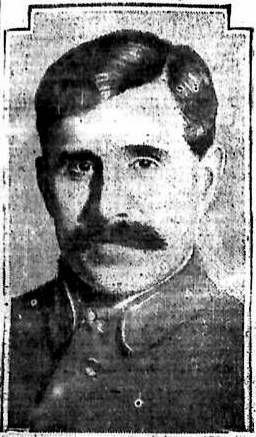
- Uglanov in 1927

First Secretary of the Moscow City Committee of the Communist Party of the Soviet Union
- In office 20 August 1924 – 27 November 1928
- Preceded by: Isaak Zelensky
- Succeeded by: Vyacheslav Molotov

Candidate member of the 14th, 15th Politburo
- In office 1 January 1926 – 29 April 1929

Full member of the 13th, 14th, 15th Secretariat
- In office 20 August 1924 – 29 April 1929

Personal details
- Born: 5 December 1886 Feodoritskoye, Yaroslavl Governorate, Russian Empire
- Died: 31 May 1937 (aged 50) Moscow, Russian SFSR, Soviet Union
- Party: Russian Communist Party (1918–1932)
- Other political affiliations: RSDLP (Bolsheviks) (1907–1918)

Nikolai Aleksandrovich Uglanov (Russian: Николай Александрович Угланов; 5 December 1886 – 31 May 1937) was a Russian Bolshevik politician and Soviet statesman who played an important role in the government of the Soviet Union as a Communist Party leader in the city of Moscow during the 1920s. Uglanov was closely associated with the so-called "Right Opposition" associated with Soviet party leader Nikolai Bukharin and he fell from his leadership position during the mass collectivization campaign of 1929. Uglanov was arrested in the summer of 1936 and was executed the following spring during the secret police terror of 1937–1938.

== Biography ==
=== Early years ===
Nikolai Aleksandrovich Uglanov was born 5 December 1886 to an ethnic Russian peasant family in the village of Feodoritskoye in Yaroslavl Governorate, located approximately 250 kilometers (160 mi) northeast of Moscow. His father Aleksander Uglanov supplemented the family income by working seasonally in the city of St. Petersburg and at the age of 12 Nikolai followed him there, working as an apprentice metal worker. Nikolai moved between jobs with some regularity and often returned home to Yaroslavl in between jobs.

Uglanov was introduced to radical ideas at an early age, beginning his participation in the revolutionary movement in 1903, distributing illegal literature and storing sensitive documents for underground activists. Uglanov joined the Russian Social Democratic Labour Party himself in 1907. As a young party activist Uglanov contributed material to the Bolshevik party paper Pravda as a worker-correspondent.

Uglanov was arrested for the first time by the Okhrana early in the summer of 1914 but he was subsequently released from captivity and inducted into the Army and sent to the front lines to fight for the Tsarist regime in World War I. In November 1914 Uglanov was severely wounded and was returned to Petrograd (St. Petersburg), where he recovered and resumed his secret revolutionary activity.

=== Political career ===
During the Russian Revolution Uglanov was a member of the Petrograd Soviet.

Uglanov became a functionary in the Soviet trade union movement and was selected as the head of the Petrograd Guberniia council of trade unions in 1919.'

In February 1921 Uglanov succeeded Sergey Zorin as secretary of the Petrograd guberniia committee of the Russian Communist Party [RKP(b)]. In this capacity he played a role in the suppression of the Kronstadt uprising, activity for which he was awarded the Order of the Red Banner. He was also made a candidate member of the governing Central Committee of the Communist Party in that year.

Uglanov was sent to the city of Nizhny Novgorod in 1922 where he was made the head of the regional party organization. In 1923 he would be elevated to a full member of the Central Committee of the RKP(b). He would remain as head of the Nizhny Novgorod organization until the summer of 1924.

In August 1924 Uglanov was called to Moscow, where he was made the second secretary of the Communist Party in the city. He was promoted to first secretary that same October.

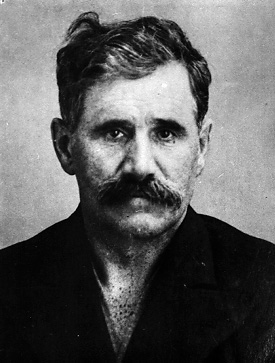
Nikolai Uglanov after his arrest by the NKVD in 1936

- 20 August 1924 – November 27, 1928, First Secretary of the Moscow Communist Party
- August 1924 – replaced Isaak Zelensky on the Secretariat of the CPSU Central Committee
- 1 January 1926 elected candidate member of the Politburo of the Central Committee of the Communist Party of the Soviet Union
- 29 November 1928 — 1 July 1930, People's Commissar for Labour

In 1930 he became associated with Martemyan Ryutin, whose name was given to the Ryutin Platform. Ryutin was Secretary of the Krasnaya Presnya district Party committee in Moscow. Uglanov was expelled from the Party along with Ryutin in autumn 1932 in what is known as the Ryutin Affair.

On 21 August 1936, during the first of the Moscow show trials, featuring Grigory Zinoviev and others, the prosecutor Andrey Vyshinsky announced that eight former high-ranking communists, including Uglanov, were under investigation because of evidence given about him at the trial. One of the eight, Mikhail Tomsky committed suicide, and six of the other seven were defendants at the subsequent show trials in 1937 and 1938.

The exception was Uglanov, who was arrested on 23 August 1936, and whose name was included on a death list signed by Stalin and three others on May 15, 1937. He was sentenced to death at a closed trial on 31 May, and shot the same day. It can be assumed that he was tried in secret because he could not be relied on to 'confess' in open court to crimes that he had not committed. The historian Robert Conquest, in his history of the Great Purge, comparing him with those who were pressured into making false confessions, wrote:

So much more admirable is the sense of truth and personal courage shown by men like Uglanov who ... seem to have 'died in silence'.
