= Jānis Rudzutaks =

Latvian-Soviet revolutionary and politician (1887–1938)

- Ян Рудзутак
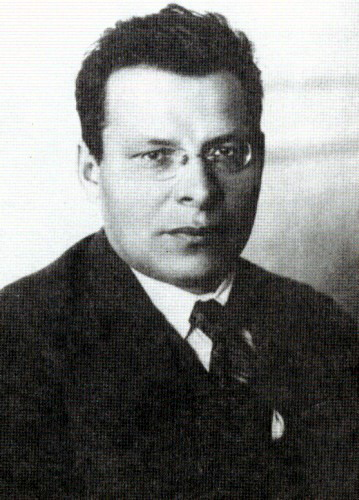
- Rudzutaks in the 1920s

People's Commissar of the Workers' and Peasants' Inspectorate
- In office 9 October 1931 – 11 February 1934
- Premier: Vyacheslav Molotov
- Preceded by: Andrey Andreyev
- Succeeded by: Post abolished

People's Commissar of Communication Routes
- In office 2 February 1924 – 11 June 1930
- Premier: Alexey Rykov
- Preceded by: Felix Dzerzhinsky
- Succeeded by: Moisey Rukhimovich

Full member of the 14th, 15th, 16th, 17th Politburo
- In office 23 July 1926 – 26 May 1937

Candidate member of the 12th, 13th, 14th Politburo
- In office 26 April 1923 – 23 July 1926

Full member of the 12th Secretariat
- In office 26 April 1923 – 2 February 1924

Personal details
- Born: 15 August 1887 Cauņi, Goldingen County, Courland Governorate, Russian Empire
- Died: 29 June 1938 (aged 50) Moscow, Russian SFSR, Soviet Union
- Party: RSDLP (Bolsheviks) (1905–1918); Russian Communist Party (1918–1937)

Jānis Rudzutaks (Russian: Ян Э́рнестович Ру́дзутак, romanized: Yan Ernestovich Rudzutak or Ian Rudzutak; 15 August [O.S. 3 August] 1887 – 29 July 1938) was a Latvian Bolshevik revolutionary and a Soviet politician. He was executed during the Great Purge.

== Early life ==
Rudzutaks was born in the Kuldīga district of the Courland Governorate (present-day Kursīši parish, Saldus municipality, Latvia), the son of a farmhand. He started work as a swineherd after two years at parish school. In 1903 at the age of 16, he ran away to Riga, where he worked in a factory. Two years later he joined the Latvian Social Democratic Labour Party.

In 1907, Rudzutaks was arrested because of his political views and was sentenced to 10 years of hard labor by military court. He served a part of his sentence in Riga and was then transferred to Butyrka prison in Moscow. Rudzutaks was released after the February Revolution of 1917.

== Political career ==
After his release, Rudzutaks served in various positions in the All-Russian Communist Party (Bolsheviks) (RCP(b)) and the trade unions. As head of the State Water Transport Administration in 1918–19, he organised the emergency delivery of food supplies along the Volga to Moscow to enable the city to function during the civil war's first month. In November 1919 he was posted to Tashkent as a member of the Turkestan Commission in charge of imposing communist rule in Central Asia. In March 1920 he was elected to the Central Committee of the RCP(b).

In November 1920 he was appointed Secretary of the All-Russian Central Council of Trade Unions. In that role he supported Vladimir Lenin's position both against the Workers' Opposition, who wanted to put the unions in control of industry, and against the left, led by Leon Trotsky, who proposed incorporating the unions in the state apparatus. At the Tenth Congress of the RCP(b), which was dominated by arguments over the future of the unions, he was re-elected to the Central Committee with 467 votes – nine more than Josif Stalin.

Rudzutaks was ousted from his position as Secretary during the All Russian Congress of Trade Unions in May 1921, when he and the chairman, Mikhail Tomsky were blamed by Lenin and the Central Committee for failing to block a resolution put forward by the veteran Marxist, David Riazanov, that would have allowed union leaders to be elected by their own members rather than being selected by the party.

In April he was sent back to Tashkent, with Tomsky, to supervise the establishment of the Turkestan Autonomous Soviet Socialist Republic. Alexander Barmine, the Soviet official who greeted them on arrival, remembered Rudzutaks as "a tall fellow with spectacles and curly hair, his strong features set in a round face."

In April 1922 Rudzutaks was a member of the Soviet delegation at the Genoa Conference, where his task appears to have been to alert Moscow whenever the unpredictable foreign minister, Georgy Chicherin, departed from his negotiating brief. From 1922 to 1923 he was the chairman of Central Asian bureau of the Central Committee of the RCP(b).

In April 1923 Rudzutaks was recalled to Moscow to work as one of three secretaries of the Central Committee, working alongside Stalin, who was General Secretary. Early in 1924, Lenin wrote his famous Testament, calling for Stalin to be sacked. It was frequently rumoured that Lenin's intention was to install Rudzutaks as the new General Secretary.

This story was mentioned in the memoirs of the Old Bolshevik Anastas Mikoyan, and in the novel Children of the Arbat by Anatoly Rybakov. It may be why Stalin removed him from the secretariat in May 1924 after Lenin's death. He continued to hold high office, and backed Stalin against Trotsky and other opponents, including his former colleague, Tomsky.

From 1924 until 1934 he was the People's Commissar (i.e., minister) for transportation. In 1926 Rudzutaks was appointed Deputy Chairman of the Council of People's Commissars (the equivalent of Deputy Premier) and held this position until 1937. In January 1926 he was made a candidate member of the Politburo. In July he was raised to full membership in place of Grigory Zinoviev, who was expelled as a member of the left opposition.

In February 1932 Rudzutaks gave up his place on the Politburo on being appointed chairman of the Central Control Commission, and of Rabkrin, making him the principal judge in cases involving alleged breaches of Communist Party discipline. He was, outwardly, totally loyal to Stalin, maintaining that even to question whether Stalin should be subject to re-election was a betrayal of the Party. However, in February 1934, he was removed and replaced by the more hard-line Lazar Kaganovich. He was restored to the Politburo, but only as a candidate member, implying that he had been demoted.

== Arrest and execution ==
Rudzutaks was suddenly expelled from the Politburo and Central Committee on 24 May 1937 and arrested the next day, shortly after the arrest of the Red Army Marshal Mikhail Tukhachevsky. There are two conflicting stories about the circumstances of Rudzutaks's arrest. One, published in the Soviet press in 1963, is that he was in a lively conversation in his dacha with Aleksandr Gerasimov and two other painters when he was seized. The other is that he was holding a supper party after a visit to the theatre, when the NKVD arrived and arrested everyone present.

Yevgenia Ginzburg, wife of a senior Bolshevik who survived the gulag, wrote about being forced to share a cell in Butyrki prison with 37 other women, four of whom were dressed in "absurd low-cut evening dresses, crumpled and bedraggled with high heeled shoes." A fellow prisoner explained that they were Rudzutaks's former dinner guests, who had been held for three months, and "the poor things haven't been allowed any parcels, so they're still in their evening dress."

This was the first arrest of a sitting member or candidate member of the Politburo — with no record of ever having opposed the party line — and a signal that no one, however senior, apart from Stalin himself, was safe. Stalin's crony Vyacheslav Molotov was asked, some 40 years later, to explain, and said that Rudzutaks was arrested because "he was too easygoing about the opposition and considered it all nonsense, trifles. That was unforgivable" and because "he indulged too much in partying with philistine friends".

Rudzutaks showed great courage under torture. Molotov was one of a delegation from the Politburo who confronted him in prison, and recalled: "Rudzutak said he had been badly beaten and tortured. Nevertheless he held firm. Indeed, he seemed to have been cruelly tortured".

He broke down under torture and confessed to being a spy, but retracted and insisted that he was innocent. He was included in a list of 118 former high-ranking Bolsheviks, which was passed to Stalin in July 1938, just as Lavrentiy Beria was about to take over control of the NKVD from the murderous Nikolai Yezhov.

Stalin instructed that they all be shot. At his trial, which lasted 20 minutes, Rudzutaks submitted a written statement protesting that "there is in the NKVD an as yet not liquidated center which is craftily manufacturing cases, which forces innocent persons to confess. There is no opportunity to prove one’s non-participation in crimes to which the confessions of various persons testify. The investigative methods are such that they force people to lie and to slander entirely innocent persons". He was sentenced to death and executed on 28 July 1938.

After Stalin's death, Rudzutaks was one of the first victims of the terror to have his case posthumously reviewed. He was cleared of all charges in 1955. His case featured prominently in Nikita Khrushchev's famous Secret Speech to the 1956 Communist Party congress.
