= Mikhail Tomsky =

Soviet trade unionist and politician (1880–1936)

- Михаил Томский
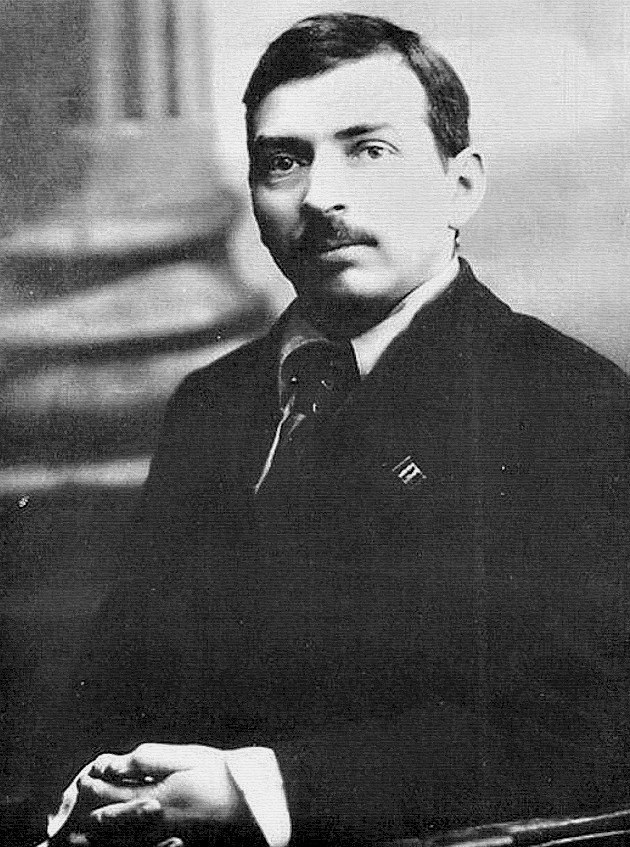
- Tomsky in 1930

Chairman of the Presidium of the All-Union Central Council of Trade Unions
- In office September 1922 – May 1929
- Preceded by: Post established
- Succeeded by: Alexander Dogadov

Secretary of the Central Executive Committee of the All-Russian Congress of Soviets
- In office 29 December 1921 – 28 December 1922
- Preceded by: Pyotr Zalutsky
- Succeeded by: Timofei Sapronov

Director of the Association of State Book and Mafazine Publishing Houses
- In office 1932–1936
- Preceded by: Artemic Khalatov
- Succeeded by: Pavel Yudin

General Secretary of the International Trade Union Council
- In office 1920 – 3 July 1921
- President: Solomon Lozovsky
- Preceded by: Post established
- Succeeded by: Post abolished

Full member of the 11th, 12th, 13th, 14th, 15th Politburo
- In office 3 April 1922 – 13 July 1930

Full member of the 10th, 11th, 12th Orgburo
- In office 16 March 1921 – 2 June 1924

Candidate member of the 9th, 13th Orgburo
- In office 2 June 1924 – 1 January 1926
- In office 5 April 1920 – 16 March 1921

Personal details
- Born: Mikhail Pavlovich Yefremov; 31 October 1880 Kolpino, Saint Petersburg Governorate, Russian Empire
- Died: 22 August 1936 (aged 55) Bolshevo, Moscow Oblast, Russian SFSR, Soviet Union
- Party: RSDLP (Bolsheviks) (1904–1918); Russian Communist Party (1918–1936)
- Occupation: Lithographer, Trade union functionary

Mikhail Pavlovich Tomsky (Russian: Михаи́л Па́влович То́мский), born Mikhail Pavlovich Yefremov (Russian: Ефре́мов) (31 October 1880 – 22 August 1936) was a factory worker, trade unionist, and Soviet politician. He was the Chairman of the All-Union Central Council of Trade Unions in the 1920s.

In his youth, Tomsky worked at the Smirnov Engineering factory in St. Petersburg, but was eventually dismissed from that job for attempting to organise a trade union. His labour activities radicalized him politically and led him to become a socialist and join the Russian Social Democratic Labour Party in 1904 and eventually join the Bolshevik faction of the party.

After the revolution, Tomsky was associated with the moderate faction of the party headed by Nikolai Bukharin and Alexei Rykov, a group seeking orderly planning, a measured tempo of industrialization, and eschewing rapid and forced collectivization of agriculture. Tomsky's primary bailiwick revolved around the trade union movement, of which he was the head and spokesman in the 1920s. An orientation towards trade union autonomy placed him in opposition to party radicals seeking rapid collectivization and strict party control over trade unions, leading to his downfall in 1928.

Tomsky was implicated in the investigation preceding the First Moscow Trial of 1936, an event which inaugurated the Great Purge. He would subsequently commit suicide to avoid arrest by the NKVD in August 1936.

== Biography ==
=== Early life (1880–1903) ===
Tomsky was born in Kolpino, Saint Petersburg Governorate, to a poor working class family of Russian ethnicity. His father was a metal worker and his mother worked as a seamstress. As such Tomsky was to become one of the relatively few "hereditary proletarians" (to use the term favored by Soviet historians) of the period. His father was an abusive alcoholic and Tomsky's mother left him shortly before Mikhail's birth, choosing to raise Mikhail and his two siblings as a single mother instead.

Tomsky's formal education was extremely paltry. He managed to learn to read at age 5 at a private boarding school which he was allowed to attend for a year due to his aunt working as a servant there. At age 9 he was enrolled in a publicly-funded elementary school, which he attended for three years, finishing the program at the top of his class. Although his scores were sufficient for entrance into secondary school, the 50 ruble tuition which was required proved beyond the impoverished family's means, and Tomsky's classroom education terminated at that point.

Although technically illegal, Tomsky joined the ranks of Russian factory workers at the age of 12, working as an apprentice box maker for a daily wage of just 5 kopecks. He was fired by the box factory after injuring a finger in a shop accident and began several years of moving from job to job in St. Petersburg, finding employment in a tobacco factory, a metal shop, and an engineering factory.

In 1894, at the age of just 14, Tomsky participated in his first strike as an employee of the Rouss–Smirnov engineering works. The strike proved a failure, resulting in Tomsky losing his job and forced to endure months of unemployment.

Tomsky soon entered the field of chromolithography (color printing) as an apprentice, eventually becoming a master lithographer in 1901 at the age of 21. Tomsky worked thereafter at a series of printing factories in St. Petersburg, gaining sufficient skill and renown that his portrait was used on a 1903 poster created to advertise the lithographic profession. He became a comparatively well-compensated print-maker, able to afford to rent a small apartment on the outskirts of the capital city on his own and to date and eventually marry a young woman from a prosperous family.

=== Early revolutionary activity (1903–1907) ===
Tomsky's life experiences made him a receptive target for illegal revolutionary literature, which he was first exposed to in 1903. He later recalled that he found the ideas expressed to be exhilarating and transformative, and in 1904 he became an active participant in a revolutionary socialist study circle [kruzhok] affiliated with the Russian Social Democratic Labour Party (RSDLP). Although the split of the RSDLP into rival Menshevik and Bolshevik wings at the group's 2nd Congress in Brussels the previous year was fresh and somewhat ill-defined, Tomsky nevertheless identified himself with the party's more youthful and aggressive Bolshevik wing.

In July 1904, Tomsky formally joined the Bolshevik party. He was also fired that same month when his employer caught him reading Iskra, the official organ of the RSDLP. He would be out of work for several months as a result, placed on a blacklist as politically unreliable.

Unable to find work in St. Petersburg, Tomsky moved to Revel (Tallinn), Estonia, then part of the Russian Empire. In the spring of 1905 he found work in the Zvezda plant, joining 150 workers there as a lithographer. News of the "Bloody Sunday" massacre of unarmed workers in St. Petersburg on January 9 already had Revel seething in discontent. He joined the local RSDLP organization there, predominantly Menshevik in orientation, and was elected as a representative to the legal Council of Factory Elders, dominated by ethnic Estonians. Tomsky gained a reputation as a clear public speaker and an effective political leader, and helped organize an October 1905 general strike in Revel — a dramatic event which held out for 10 days.

With the 1905 Revolution against the autocracy in full force, in November Tomsky was elected as a member of the governing Presidium of the Revel Council of Workers' Deputies — a body modeled after a similar organization in St. Petersburg. He also took advantage of limited new freedoms granted by the October Manifesto grudgingly acceded to by Tsar Nikolai II by helping to organize the Revel Metal Workers' Union, becoming that organization's chair. He was also one of three organizers of a December strike which shut down operations of the railroad line running through the city.

With the coming of 1906, the old regime began to strike back, with the secret police conducting mass arrests of known radical leaders. Tomsky was swept up with the rest of the Revel Soviet on January 13, 1906. He sat for four months in jail before being shipped out to western Siberia on an arrest wagon without trial. He was assigned to administrative exile in the village of Parabel, located in Tomsk Oblast. He would only remain two months in this lightly supervised setting until making his escape westward.

On his way back to St. Petersburg, the former Mikhail Yefremov made use of the RSDLP's underground network of safehouses and began using the party pseudonym "Tomsky" — man from Tomsk — for the first time.

Tomsky arrived in St. Petersburg in August 1906 and returned to revolutionary political activity, rapidly gaining stature in the decimated and demoralized Bolshevik organization. He began to concentrate on trade union organizing, helping to get a collective agreement for the St. Petersburg Printers' Union. He helped to establish the Engravers' and Chromolithographers' Union in St. Petersburg in 1907, heading that organization and leading it to merge with the Lithographers' and Printers' Union as a single organization.

He was also named a membe of the St. Petersburg Committee of the Bolshevik Party in 1907, working closely with top party leaders such as Grigory Zinoviev.

In the spring of 1907, Tomsky went abroad to attend the London Congress of the RSDLP, a gathering attended by all factions of the Russian socialist movement. Upon conclusion of the congress on June 1 he made his way back to Russia, where he was arrested, briefly imprisoned, and then released.

=== Further arrest and exile (1908–1917) ===
Tomsky was arrested in 1908 and then exiled to France, but returned to Russia in 1909 where he was again arrested for his political activities and sentenced to five years of hard labour. He was freed by the Provisional Government after the February Revolution in 1917 and moved to Moscow, where he participated in the October Revolution.

In 1918 he attended the Fourth All Russian Conference of Trade Unions (12–17 March), where he moved a resolution concerning the Relations between the Trade Unions and the Commissariat for Labour which stated that the October Revolution had changed "the meaning and character of state organs and significance of proletarian organs as well". It was elaborated that previously the old ministry of Labour had acted as arbitrator between Labour and Capital, whereas the new Commissariat was the champion of the economic policy of the working class.

=== Second revolutionary period (1917–1928) ===
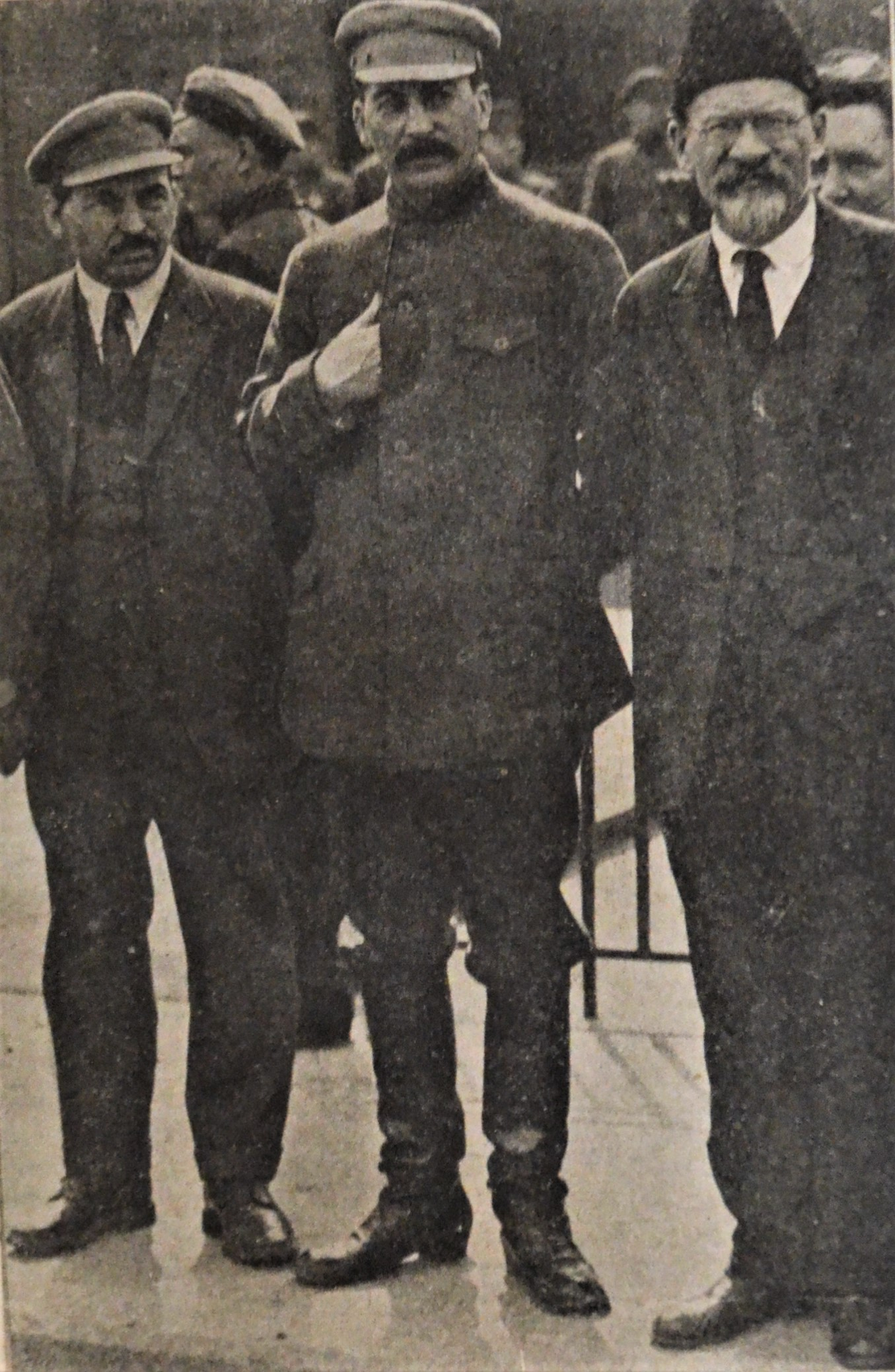
Celebration of May 1 in Moscow 1926. From left: Mikhail Tomsky, Joseph Stalin and Mikhail Kalinin

He was elected to the Central Committee in March 1919, to its Orgburo in 1921 and to the Politburo in April 1922.

Tomsky was an ally of Nikolai Bukharin and Alexey Rykov, who led the moderate (or right) wing of the Communist Party in the 1920s.

Together, they were allied with Joseph Stalin's faction and helped him purge the United Opposition — led by Leon Trotsky, Lev Kamenev, and Grigory Zinoviev — from the Party during the struggle that followed Lenin's death in 1924.

=== Demise (1928–1936) ===
In 1928 Stalin moved against his former allies, defeating Bukharin, Rykov and Tomsky at the April 1929 Plenary Meeting of the Central Committee and forcing Tomsky to resign from his position as leader of the trade union movement in May 1929. Tomsky was put in charge of the Soviet chemical industry, a position which he occupied until 1930. He was not re-elected to the Politburo after the 16th Communist Party Congress in July 1930, but remained a full member of the Central Committee until the next Congress in January 1934, when he was demoted to candidate (non-voting) member.

Tomsky headed the State Publishing House from May 1932 until August 1936, when he was accused of terrorist connections during the First Moscow Trial of Zinoviev and Kamenev. Rather than face arrest by the NKVD, Tomsky committed suicide by gunshot in his dacha in Bolshevo, near Moscow. Before committing suicide, he told his wife to tell the investigators that it was Genrikh Yagoda who drove him to the path of opposition, which was later found by Nikolai Yezhov.

=== Legacy ===
Tomsky was posthumously found guilty of participation in an anti-Soviet conspiracy during the Trial of the Twenty-One in March 1938.

In 1988, during Perestroika, the Soviet government cleared Tomsky of all charges, and he was reinstated as a member of the Communist Party of the Soviet Union.

== Works ==
- The Trade Unions, the Party, and the State. Moscow: Commission for Foreign Relations of the Central Council of the Trade Unions of the USSR, 1927.

== See also ==
- Outline of the Russian Revolution and Civil War
- Bibliography of the Russian Revolution and Civil War
- Bibliography of Stalinism and the Soviet Union
- Index of Old Bolsheviks
- Index of articles related to the Russian Revolution and Civil War
