= Nikolai Antipov =

Soviet politician

- Николай Антипов
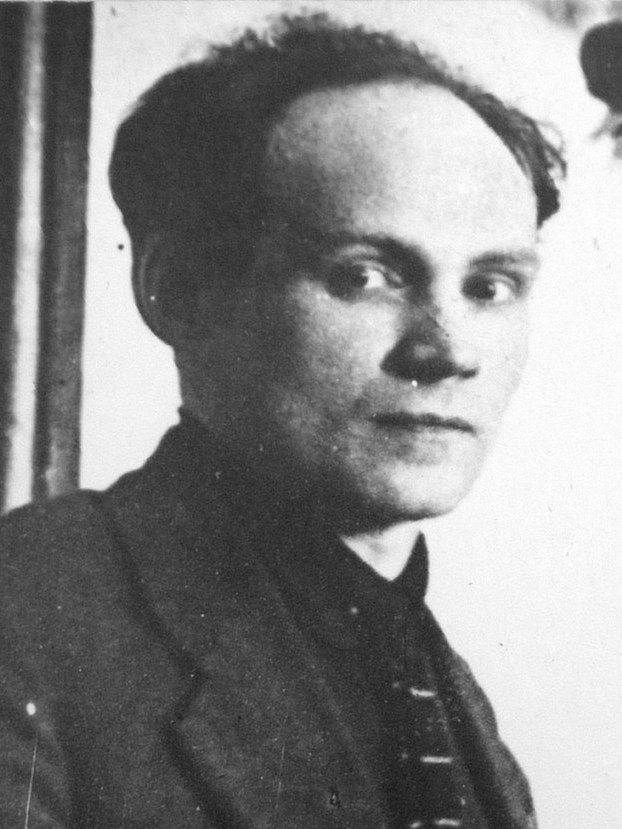
- Antipov in 1925

Deputy Chairman of the Council of Ministers of the Soviet Union
- In office 27 April 1935 – 21 June 1937
- Premier: Vyacheslav Molotov

Personal details
- Born: 15 December [O.S. 3 December] 1894 Lisichkino village Starorussky Uyezd, Novgorod Governorate, Russian Empire
- Died: 29 July 1938 (aged 43) Moscow, Soviet Union
- Party: RSDLP (Bolsheviks) (1912–1918); Russian Communist Party (1918–1937)

Nikolai Kirillovich Antipov (Russian: Никола́й Кири́ллович Анти́пов; 15 December 1894 – 29 July 1938) was a Soviet politician. He was appointed Member of the Central Executive Committee of the Soviet Union and elected member of the Central Committee of the Communist Party of the Soviet Union (1924–1937) and candidate member of the Orgburo (1924–1925, 1928–1930). He was executed during the Great Purge and rehabilitated posthumously.

== Biography ==
Antipov was born on 15 December [O.S. 3 December] 1894 in the village of Lisichkino, Starorussky Uyezd, Novgorod Governorate, in the family of a peasant. He was of Russian ethnicity.

Antipov trained as a fitter at a nautical technical school, and worked as a locksmith in a Saint Petersburg shipyard and in the Dynamo factory, Moscow. In 1912 he joined the ranks of RSDLP (b). He was arrested in 1913 for participating in the activities organized by the party. In 1914, he was once again rearrested, and spent a year in prison. Arrested for a third time, for running an underground printing press, he was released during the February Revolution. In 1917, he was elected to the Petrograd Committee of RSDLP (b) and a deputy of the Petrograd Soviet, and in October 1917 to the Presidium of the Petrograd Central Council of factory committees.

In August 1918, he was appointed to the post of vice-president and then (January 1919) to the office of President of Petrograd Cheka, replacing Varvara Yakovleva. In 1919, he was transferred to Kazan, serving as a secretary of the Kazan Governorate Communist Party Committee. In 1920, he was transferred to Moscow. to work in the People's Commissariat for Transport, and later as Secretary of the Moscow Committee of the Communist Party.

In 1924, he was elected a member of the Communist Party Central Committee, and appointed head of Ograspred, the Central Committee department responsible for appointing personnel, which brought him into regular, close contact with the General secretary, Josif Stalin. In January 1926, he was appointed First Secretary of the Ural Regional Committee. In 1926, he was moved to the post of the Second Secretary of the Leningrad Regional Committee and Secretary of the Northwest Office of the Communist Party.

From January 16, 1928, to March 30, 1931, Antipov served as head of the People's Commissariat for Posts and Telegraphs of the USSR. In 1931, he was appointed to the position of People's Commissar of the Workers' and Peasants' Inspectorate of the USSR. He was soon appointed to the post of Deputy Chairman of the Commission of Soviet Control under the Council of People's Commissars of the USSR.

On April 27, 1935, Antipov was appointed to the position of Chairman of the USSR Commission on Soviet Control and Deputy Premier of the Soviet Union. During the Great Purge, Antipov was arrested on June 21, 1937, and expelled from the Communist Party. On July 28, 1938, he was sentenced to death by the Military Collegium of the Supreme Court of the Soviet Union and executed by shooting the next day.

On June 30, 1956, the decision of the Military Collegium of the Supreme Court was quashed, and Antipov was rehabilitated and restored to the ranks of the Communist Party.

== Bibliography ==
- State power of the USSR. The highest authorities and administrations and their leaders. 1923–1991 Historical-biographical reference/DSGL. Ivkin. –M.: Russian Political Encyclopedia (Rosspen), 1999. Is ISBN 5-8243-0014-3.
- The Encyclopedia of the secret services of Russia/author-writer Kolpakidi. –M.: AST: Astrel: Tranzitkniga, 2004. –C. 431. –800 c.–ISBN 5-17018975-3.

Preceded by Artemi Lyubovitsh	People's Commissar for Posts and Telegraphs; 1928–1931	Succeeded by Alexey Rykov
Preceded by Valery Mezhlauk	Deputy Premier of the Soviet Union; 1935–1937	Succeeded by Anastas Mikoyan
