= Pyotr Smorodin =

Soviet politician

- Пётр Смородин
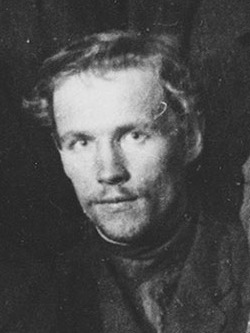

First Secretary of the Stalingrad City Committee of the Communist Party of the Soviet Union
- In office 7 June 1938 – 16 June 1938

First Secretary of the Stalingrad Regional Committee of the Communist Party of the Soviet Union
- In office 1937 – 16 June 1938
- Preceded by: Boris Semenov
- Succeeded by: Aleksey Chuyanov

First Secretary of the Central Committee of the Komsomol
- In office 28 September 1921 – 18 July 1924
- Preceded by: Lazar Shatskin
- Succeeded by: Nikolai Chaplin

Personal details
- Born: Pyotr Ivanovich Smorodin; 20 January 1897 Borinsky, Voronezh, Russian Empire
- Died: 25 February 1939 (aged 42) Stalingrad, Russian SFSR, Soviet Union
- Citizenship: Soviet Union; Russian Empire (previously)
- Party: CPSU (1917–1938)
- Awards: Order of the Red Banner

Pyotr Ivanovich Smorodin (Russian: Пётр Иванович Смородин; 20 January 1897 – 25 February 1939) was a Soviet politician who was a founding member of the Komsomol, the First Secretary of the Central Committee of the Komsomol from 1921 to 1924, a member of the NKVD troika, the First Secretary of the Stalingrad Regional Committee of the Communist Party of the Soviet Union from 1937 to 1938, and the First Secretary of the Stalingrad City Committee of the Communist Party of the Soviet Union from 1938 until his execution in 1939 during the Great Purge.

== Early life and education ==
Pyotr Smorodin was born into a peasant family on January 20, 1897, in the village of Borinskoye. From 1911 to 1917, he was an ordinary worker who worked in Saint Petersburg. In 1928, he graduated from the Communist Academy, majoring in Marxist courses.

== Political career ==
He joined the Russian Social Democratic Labour Party (Bolsheviks) in May 1917 and directly participated in the October Revolution. He also participated in the creation of the Petrograd Socialist Union of Working Youth in 1917 and continued working there until 1920. Smorodin was also a delegate to the 8th Congress of the Russian Communist Party (Bolsheviks) which was held in 1919.

Smorodin became a member of the Central Committee of the Komsomol in 1920 and served as the Secretary of the Petrograd Regional Committee of the Komsomol. He was then elected as the First Secretary of the Central Committee of the Komsomol, which made him the de facto leader of the Komsomol on September 28, 1921, and served in the position until July 18, 1924.

From 1928 to 1937, he served as the Head of the Organizational Department and as the Secretary of various District Committees of the Communist Party of the Soviet Union in Leningrad. He also became a candidate member of the Central Committee of the Communist Party of the Soviet Union in 1930. He also served as the Second Secretary of the Leningrad Regional Committee of the Communist Party of the Soviet Union in 1937. From September 1937 to June 1938, he served as the First Secretary of the Stalingrad Regional Committee of the Communist Party of the Soviet Union and was appointed as the First Secretary of the Stalingrad City Committee of the Communist Party of the Soviet Union on June 7, 1938. He became a member of the NKVD troika on July 30, 1937, and actively participated in the Great Purge and Stalinist political repressions in the Leningrad and Stalingrad area.

However, on June 16, 1938, Smorodin was dismissed from his post as First Secretary of the Stalingrad Regional Committee of the Communist Party of the Soviet Union by the Central Committee of the Communist Party of the Soviet Union. On August 28, 1938, he was expelled from the Communist Party of the Soviet Union as "an enemy of the people." He was arrested, sentenced to death, and was executed on February 25, 1939. On December 1, 1954, the Military Collegium of the Supreme Court of the USSR posthumously exonerated him.

== Awards ==
Pyotr Smorodin was awarded the Order of the Red Banner in 1930.

- (Soviet Union) Order of the Red Banner

== Legacy ==
A memorial plaque of Pyotr Smorodin can be found on the house he formerly lived in on Vasilievsky Island, Saint Petersburg.

== See also ==
- Komsomol
- NKVD troika
- Great Purge
