= Milchakov =

Milchakov, female Milchakova (Russian: Мильчаков) is a Russian surname. Notable people with the surname include:

- Alexander Milchakov (1903–1973), Soviet politician
- Alexey Milchakov (born 1991), Russian neo-Nazi
- Dmitri Milchakov (born 1986), Belarusian ice hockey player
