= Komsomol =

Youth division of the CPSU

All-Union Leninist Young Communist League Всесоюзный ленинский коммунистический союз молодёжи
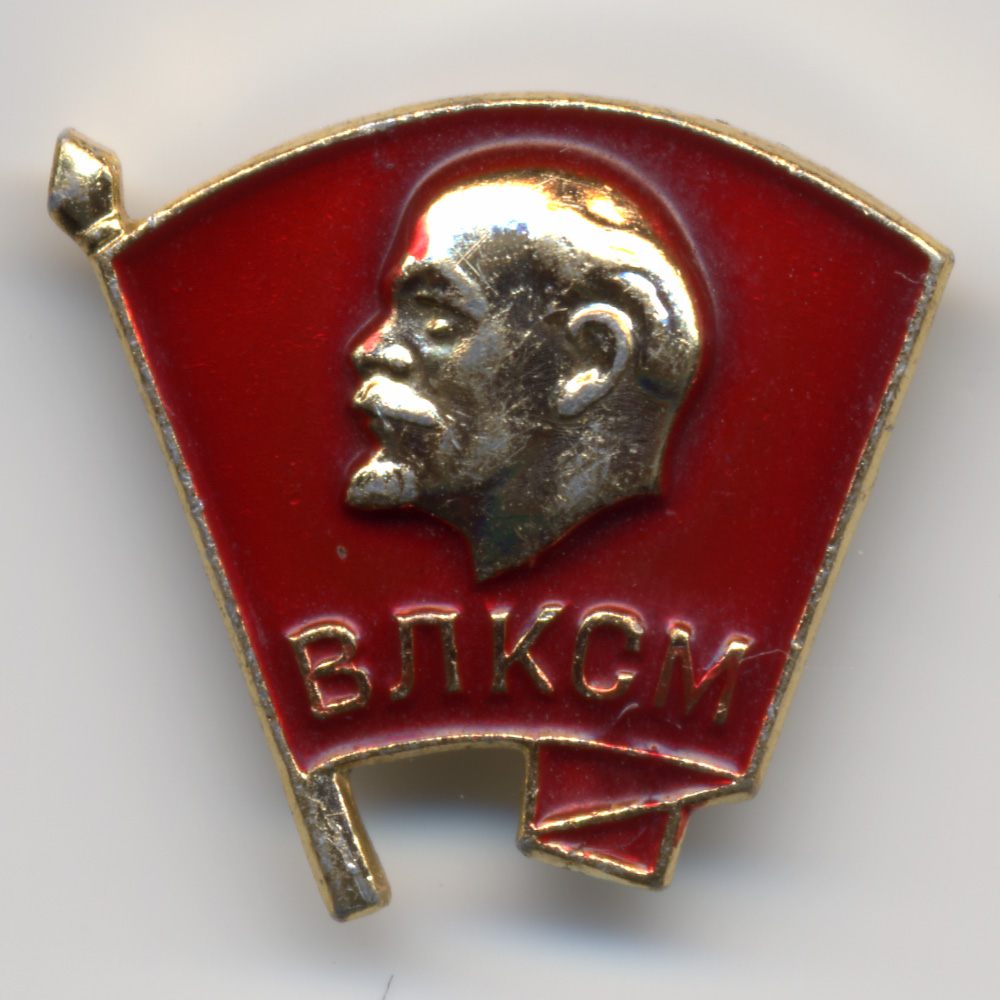
- Founded: 29 October 1918; 108 years ago
- Dissolved: 28 September 1991; 35 years ago
- Succeeded by: Russian Communist Youth League
- Ideology: Communism; Marxism–Leninism
- Position: Far-left
- Mother party: Communist Party of the Soviet Union (de facto)
- International affiliation: YCI; WFDY
- Newspaper: Komsomolskaya Pravda

The All-Union Leninist Young Communist League, (Note: Russian: Всесоюзный ленинский коммунистический союз молодёжи (ВЛКСМ), romanized: Vsesoyuznyy leninskiy kommunisticheskiy soyuz molodyozhi (VLKSM),) commonly known as Komsomol, (Note: /ˌkɒmsəˈmɒl/; Russian: Комсомол (Russian pronunciation: [kəmsɐˈmol]) a syllabic abbreviation of the Russian Коммунистический Союз Молодёжи, Kommunisticheskiy Soyuz Molodyozhi) was a communist youth organization in the Soviet Union. It is sometimes described as the youth section of the Communist Party of the Soviet Union (CPSU), although it was formally independent and referred to as "the helper and the reserve of the CPSU".

The Komsomol in its earliest form was established in urban areas in 1918. During the early years, it was a Russian organization, known as the Russian Young Communist League, or RKSM. During 1922, with the unification of the USSR, it was reformed into an all-union agency, the youth division of the All-Union Communist Party.

It was the final stage of three youth organizations with members up to age 28, graduated at 14 from the Young Pioneers, and at nine from the Little Octobrists.

== History ==
=== Background ===
Prior to the February Revolution of 1917, none of the three primary Marxist political parties of the Russian Empire — the Social Democratic Labor Party Bolsheviks, Mensheviks, or Party of Socialist Revolutionaries — had the possibility of establishing or maintaining a formal youth section owing to their illegality and the pervasiveness of state repression. The war did provide the impetus for underground circles of young workers to emerge in Russia's biggest cities as early as 1915 and 1916, however. These organizations, typically organized at the factory level, gathered to read and discuss political literature and did not typically have a "specific youth consciousness," but rather functioned as typical radical study circles, albeit composed of youthful members. There was no common organizational structure to unite these independently functioning groups.

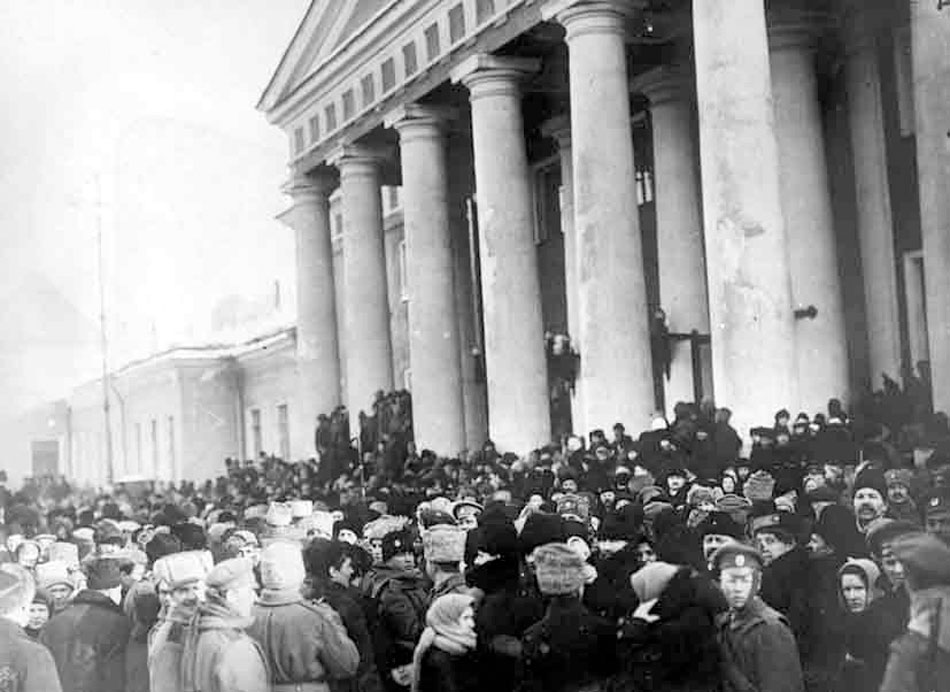
Crowd outside the Tauride Palace in Petrograd during the February Revolution of 1917.

Historian Matthias Neumann indicates that the initial rise of a radical youth movement in the city was "clearly linked to the protests of women workers who brought their grievances onto the streets on 23 February, International Women's Day. With female activists transiting from factory to factory, calling out their peers, "young metalworkers in particular responded" to the women's appeal. Many young workers had been radicalized by three years of bloody world war, and young, urban workers were particularly aggressive in the spontaneous street protests which had overthrown the old regime.

Young workers made up a substantial percentage of armed revolutionaries in the street during the February uprising. About half of the forces defending the Tauride Palace during the revolution were youths, while at the factory level, between a quarter and a third of the participants in the factory Red Guards were young workers. Over the first few months of the revolution, these independent groups of young workers began to think of themselves as a separate, focused subdivision of the revolutionary movement.

=== Trud i Svet (Labor and Light) ===
On 13 April 1917 a citywide conference was held in Petrograd attempting to organize these disparate grouplets, with an organization bureau resulting from the meeting. This bureau was given the task of expanding the organization of radical youth from the heavily industrialized Vyborg and Peterhof districts and for establishing youth commissions to monitor occupational safety and provide professional training and education in all factories.

May Day 1917 marked an important turning point for the Russian radical youth movement, with the Petrograd youth movement gaining an organizational identity as Trud i Svet (Labor and Light) and successfully mobilizing 100,000 young workers, who marched in their own separate columns through the streets of the city in honor of International Labor Day. By the summer of 1917, Trud i Svet had emerged as a mass organization, claiming 50,000 members, with Peter Shevtsov the group's outstanding leader. Shevtsov's place was formalized in the middle of May, when he was elected chair of a new All-District Youth Council for Petrograd. This would mark a high water mark for the organized socialist youth movement in the capital city; one year later only 1,500 people would remain in the ranks.

Trud i Svet believed the path for developing a strong organization capable of fighting for its rights revolved in large measure around worker education. The group's program called for the foundation of grammar schools and a university for young workers and for the establishment of polytechnical and industrial trades schools for the training of young workers, who were frequently newly arrived members of the peasantry. The organization also sought to achieve wage equivalence for young and older workers, the six-hour workday, and for the participation of young workers on the decision-making bodies of factory committees. While identifying itself as socialist, Trud i Svet placed a premium on class unity across party lines to acieve results — a rigid "non-partyism" (bezpartiinost') that would soon bring it into conflict with the hardline Bolshevik organization.

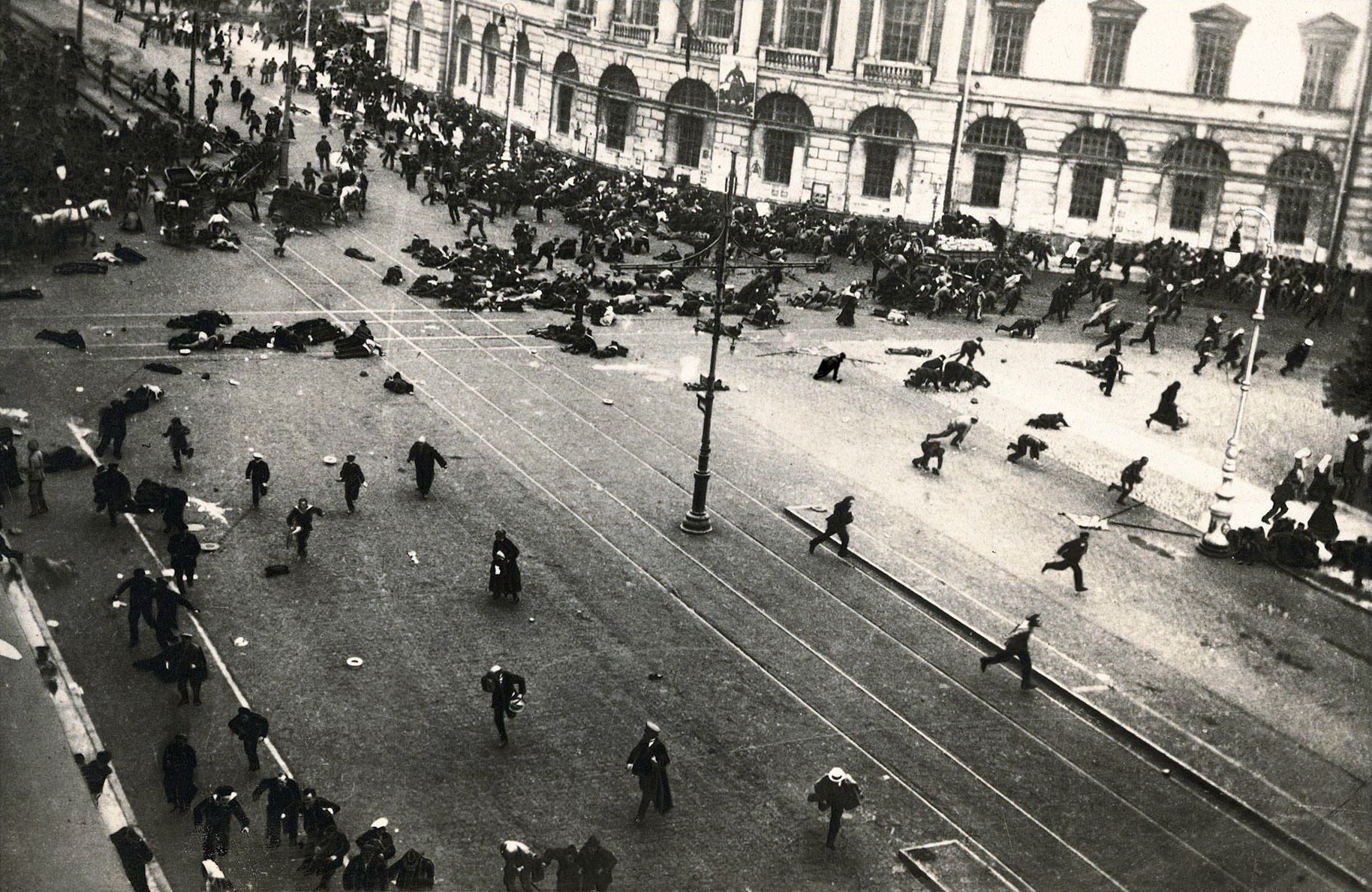
Street protest in Petrograd being gunned down by troops of the Provisional Government. Although originating spontaneously, the Bolsheviks were blamed for the 4 July 1917 disturbance, leading to the arrest of prominent party leaders.

These moderate goals of the central leadership of Trud i Svet were not accepted by many local groups in the increasingly radical environment of Petrograd in 1917, however, and clear signs of a split of the largely decentralized organization began to be observed. This dissatisfaction grew throughout June, with a number of district branches rejecting the proposed education-first charter of the organization.

The July Days street protests against the Provisional Government over its refusal to terminate Russian participation in World War I marked another decisive turning point. In the aftermath of the failed revolt, for which the Bolsheviks were blamed and which generated a sweeping series of arrests of Bolshevik leaders, Trud i Svet head Shevtsov criticized the uprising and defended the organization's controversial proposed charter — a grave political mistake since most members of the organization had participated in the protests. A formal split would result.

=== Socialist League of Young Workers (SSRM) ===
At a meeting of the Petrograd All-District Council of Trud i Svet held 27 July 1917, the internal conflict within Trud i Svet came to a head when Shevtsov's opponents voted in a majority for the dissolution of the council. This new majority group called for a citywide conference of radical youth to be held 18 August. A dissident youth organization known as the Socialist League of Young Workers (Sotsialisticheski soiuz rabochei molodëzhi, or SSRM), based in the Narva–Peterhof district of the city, had already emerged, positioning itself as an uncompromisingly radical alternative to Trud i Svet, which retained loyalty to the Provisional Government. This parallel radical organization was headed by a lathe operator at the Putilov Works, Vasilii Alekseev, a 21-year old member of the Bolshevik organization.

The SSRM drew up its own charter and program in July, calling for a 6-hour day for workers under age 16, establishment of a minimum wage for young workers, and demanding voting rights for 18-year olds. The organization declared its intention to develop class consciousness among young workers and to develop them intellectually and politically in the fight for socialism and in order to better defend their economic interests. The Petrograd-based SSRM declared its formation preparatory to the establishment of a national All-Russian League of Young Workers, with its direction to be conducted by an 11-member Petrograd Committee that would appoint editors, print pamphlets, provide speakers, conduct mass meetings, and pass resolutions binding upon subsidiary organizations.

The Bolshevik-oriented Socialist League of Young Workers, with its strongest support provided by young metal workers, counted about 13,000 members at the end of a conference it held in Petrograd from 18 to 28 August. Unlike Trud i Svet, whose summer membership of 50,000 attenuated rapidly as moderates withdrew from the movement, the SSRM grew as the political situation in the capital city intensified in the summer and fall of 1917, with its membership variously estimated between 20,000 and 32,000 by the time of the October Revolution that brought the Bolsheviks to power. This number would plummet over the year that followed, in tandem with the crumbling of the factory committees in the increasingly disorganized factories. By the time of the 5th Petrograd City Conference in September 1918, the SSRM had dwindled to fewer than 700 members.

It is worthy of note that the Socialist League of Young Workers, while closely oriented to the Bolshevik Party, was not a homogeneous or disciplined organization. During the last month before the October revolution, many of the rank-and-file members of the organization sought to push the SSRM to economic tasks, such as creating factory committees of young workers that would act almost as a youth section of the trade union movement, coordinating workers and management on wage rates, working conditions, and hiring and firing. In addition, these factory committees were to oversee a range of educational activities, including factory schools, shop libraries, and the booking of lecturers. Another part of the organization, including top leaders, contended that the SSRM was a political, not an economic, formation.

=== Establishment of the Komsomol ===
With the SSRM at low ebb in the summer of 1918, the Central Committee of the Russian Communist Party (RKP) stepped in, setting up an organizing committee to host a 1st Congress of Worker and Peasant Youth in the fall. An appeal was made to small local radical youth organizations around the country and the SSRM refused a large infusion of members from the Bolshevik organization proper, culminating in a decision in early October to make participation in the SSRM compulsory for party members up to the age of 20. The Central Committee also instructed its local organizations to help their local youth organizations send delegates to the forthcoming convention, thereby exerting decisive influence on its composition.

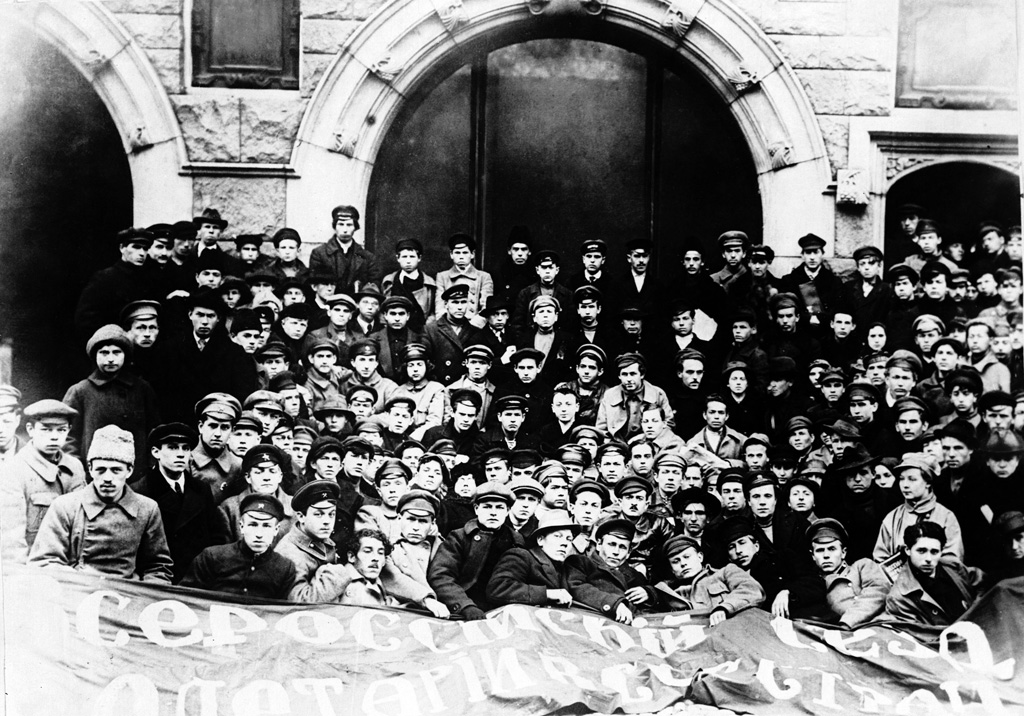
Some of the 176 delegates to the founding congress of the Komsomol, Moscow, late October and early November 1918.

On 29 October 1918, 176 elected delegates assembled in Moscow for what would become the founding convention of the Communist Youth League. Of these 88 were card-carrying members of the RKP, with another 38 formally identifying themselves as sympathizers. The remaining delegates were mostly not members of any party (45), with one delegate claiming to be an anarchist, one a member of the Left Socialist Revolutionary Party, and three Menshevik-Internationalists. These delegates claimed to represent some 120 youth groups, with a combined membership of 22,100.

According to the group's initial regulations, membership was open to young people between the ages of 14 and 23. This was a large demographic during the early years of Soviet Russia, comprising some 20 million people in the Russian Federation alone in 1926 — nearly a quarter of the population. Nationwide the 15–25 year old demographic represented 20.4% of the population, of whom 80% lived in the countryside.

As historian of the international young Communist movement Richard Cornell observes:

"From its inception in the fall of 1918, the Komsomol was subordinate to the Russian party. Not having existed in 1917 when the Bolshevik revolution took place, it had no tradition of direct and independent participation in revolutionary activities.... A specific statement on the manner in which the party would exercise its guidance of Komsomol affairs was issued in mid-1919, and ratified by the second Komsomol congress in October."

According to the resolution adopted by the 2nd Congress of the Komsomol, the organization's governing Central Committee was to work under the direct control of the Central Committee of the RKP(b) and its local organizations were to work according to the direction of local units of the adult party. Moreover, members of the Komsomol's Central Committee were to be subject to reassignment to other work by the Communist Party, despite having been elected to their positions by the Komsomol congress. Substantial freedom of discussion remained within the youth organization for several years, but this steadily attenuated under the control of the adult party, with dissidents and non-conformists ultimately forced to recant or face removal.

=== Komsomol during the Russian Civil War (1918–1920) ===
The intense struggle for a new socialist future appealed to a substantial segment of young Russians. As historian Mattheus Neumann notes, "young people became involved in historic change, and they really felt it.... Excitement was in the air and adventure was just around the corner in most cities." Ranks of the fledgling Red Army were overwhelmingly youthful, with 68 percent of Red Army volunteers between the ages of 18 and 31 in 1918.

The Komsomol was an adjunct of this formative process of a new army, with the first program of the organization making military training part of the league's activities. This portion of Komsomol activities was further accelerated during the military crisis in the spring of 1919, when 3,000 members of the organization were mobilitzed for the front. Another 1,335 komsomoltsy were brought into Army ranks by the fall. Tens of thousands of Komsomol members wound up joining the fight during the pivotal years of 1918 and 1919.

These young recruits, frequently members of the Communist Party, were enthusiastic true-believers in the revolution, were expected to behave with exemplary levels of discipline, and frequently assumed leadership roles as political commissars. Other Komsomol members provided recruits for the political police, the Cheka. With universal conscription becoming law in May 1918, and the Komsomol worked hand in glove with units of the Bolshevik Party in ongoing recruitment campaigns. The enthusiasm of the young communists in the ranks proved infectious, improving general morale by their presence.

This close daily connection also helped bring non-party young soldiers into the Komsomol, with the organizing growing between to about 96,000 members in the fall of 1919 before nearly quintupling to 480,000 members in October 1920.

Conceptually, the Komsomol rapidly came to be viewed by Soviet party leaders as a "transmission belt" for centrally-determined policy, a mobilization tool to be used to transform decisions into action.

Outside of military participation, the young communists became key supporters of the movement towards "militarization of labor" during the period of War Communism — the attempt to restart and maintain production of the failing factories through the imposition of quasi-military discipline. They also were organizers and enthusiasts on behalf of the Subbotniks — voluntary unpaid Saturday workdays.

In the countryside, komsomoltsy were mobilized for grain requisitions — hyperinflation and the lack of manufactured goods for exchange having rendered any market-based approach to obtaining grain for the cities impossible. This proved to be a "dirty war" in which force and violence were standard operating procedure and during which brutal excesses were committed against the peasants.

The Komsomol was also given the task of performing cultural work, including development of literacy and educational programs in the countryside, although these were more or less subsumed by the exigencies of the ongoing civil war.

=== Komsomol during the NEP period ===
In contrast to the sense of revolutionary enthusiasm spurred by the adventure of the civil war, the New Economic Policy (NEP) implemented in 1921, marking a formal retreat of the nation's economy to private commerce, initially had an opposite effect upon Komsomol members. This was a time of cultural experimentation and a liberalization of sexual mores; the party instead tended to promote more conservative and traditional models of thought and behavior as a means of fostering labor discipline.

This contrast between the "Good Communist" extolled by the party and the capitalism fostered by NEP disoriented many young people. Many rebelled against the Party's ideals in two opposite ways: radicals gave up everything that had any Western or capitalist connotations, while the majority of Russian youths felt drawn to the Western-style popular culture of entertainment and fashion. As a result, there was a major slump in interest and membership in the Party-oriented Komsomol.

Despite the temporary shock associated with the start of NEP, the 1920s proved to be a decade of rapid growth for the Komsomol. Membership in the organizationin the provinces was open to all who wished to join and party propaganda placed a particular emphasis on bringing young people into Komsomol ranks to provide a pool of potential recruits for party membership as well as a tool of policy.

According to the organizational rules established by the 6th Komsomol Congress in June 1924, membership was open to anyone between the ages of 14 and 23 who knew the organization's program and statutes, participated in one of its organizations, abided by all organizational resolutions, and paid monthly dues. Working class and peasant applicants were to be immediately admitted, while students of white-collar social origins were to be admitted on a one-year probationary basis only after having received the recommendations of two members of Komsomol or the Communist Party.

By 1925, Komsomol, after adding more than 525,000 new members in that year alone, counted more than 1 million young people in its ranks. Many others were in theater groups for younger children. Rapid growth continued throughout 1926 and 1927, with Komsomol membership hitting a NEP-period peak of 1.75 million members.

This rapid growth during the mid-part of the 1920s was driven by the great expansion of rural Komosomol cells. In most rural districts, membership in the Komsomol exceeded that of the Communist Party itself — although the party exercised formal control over its youth section, defining its agenda, supervising members and monitoring Komsomol activity.

Older peasants reacted negatively to the growth of the Komsomol in rural areas. They saw the administrators as intruders who prevented their children from fulfilling their family obligations. The Komsomol needed full-time commitment, and peasant youths, who saw it as a chance for social mobility, education, and economic success, were willing to abandon their traditional duties to join. At the end of NEP, the majority of Komsomol members were peasants, while the administration remained largely urban.

"Long Live the Many-Million Ranks of the Leninist Komsomol" (1932), poster by Gustav Klutsis (1895–1938).

Both the urban and rural populations had problems with the Komsomol's attempts to unify the two demographics. Rural parents believed that because the League's administration was city-centered, their children would be negatively influenced by city dwellers. In addition, land-owning peasants were much more affected by the government's revocation of private ownership, and many were uninterested in allowing their children to participate. For its part, the urban population viewed itself as superior to the peasants. They saw the rural members as backward and uneducated, and were angered by their swelling numbers.

The party attempted to maintain numerical dominance by workers in the organization, even in rural ranks, although this proved difficult if not impossible to achieve in some locales due to the numerical weakness of the Communist Party in the countryside.

One tool the Communist Party pursued in its attempt to maintain working class hegemony over the increasingly rural Komsomol came in the form of mass expulsions. In 1925 alone, more than 141,000 Komosomol members, representing 27% of those newly admitted and mostly rural, were expelled from the organization for various ostensible infractions. As Brovkin notes, such a high churn rate was indicative of dual antagonistic desires being pursued by the party — growing Komsomol membership as rapidly as possible while retaining urban control — "nearly impossible in an agrarian society."

One of the most popular campaigns revolved around Novyi Byt (The New Way of Life). At these assemblies, the leadership of the Komsomol promoted the values they considered to be the most important for the ideal young communist. The New Soviet Man was to be "a lively, active, healthy, disciplined youngster who subordinates himself to the collective and is prepared for and dedicated to learn, study, and work." By establishing strict guidelines to what they expected, the Komsomol was able to denounce the traits and habits they saw as being harmful to the youth. It condemned sexual promiscuity, drinking, smoking and general mischievous behavior, as it posed moral danger to the organization's young members.

Efforts against alcoholism were given particular emphasis, with one Komsomol writer asserting that the abuse of "vodka poisons and destroys the organism, it bears us out of the world of reality into a world of illusion," and therefore was "a violation of our class, proletarian, and communist morality."

The Komsomol also participated in campaigns of an anti-religious nature. The new communist regime wished to dismantle whatever control the Orthodox church had on society, and the young were in the forefront of those seeking to overturn old ways in the building of a radically new society. The Komsomol rallied members to march in the streets, declaring their independence from religion. Open harassment of church members sprang up, and earned the Komsomol a negative image in the minds of older generations. When the League made attempts to draw back on their anti-religious rhetoric, Soviet youth became increasingly disinterested in the organization.

In some locales, Komosomol cells more closely resembled social clubs of hooligans than the clean-cut representatives of New Socialist Man of official myth. One village schoolteacher in Nerekhta uezd complained to Komsomol officials that komsomoltsy were having boisterous drinking and dancing parties in the school library. Another cell in the North Caucasus wrote a note to a local priest threatening to shoot him if he did not stop preaching. From Voronezh came a report of a cell that bombarded a sacred icon with rotten eggs during a religious service.

These and similar widespread abuses led to the isolation and ostracization of Komsomol cells in the villages, rendering them a marginal and numerically insignificant organization in most villages by 1928.

=== Komsomol during Collectivization and the first Five-year Plan ===
In conjunction with the War Scare of 1927 and the grain procurement crisis in the fall of that year, met with a return to the violent requisition methods previously associated with War Communism, the Komsomol increasingly focused the orientation of its members towards an aggressive class-based approach to society. While class discrimination had been part and parcel of the regime since the October Revolution, a new campaign against so-called "alien elements" and "social aliens" came to the fore in the press of the Communist Party and the Komsomol after 1927.

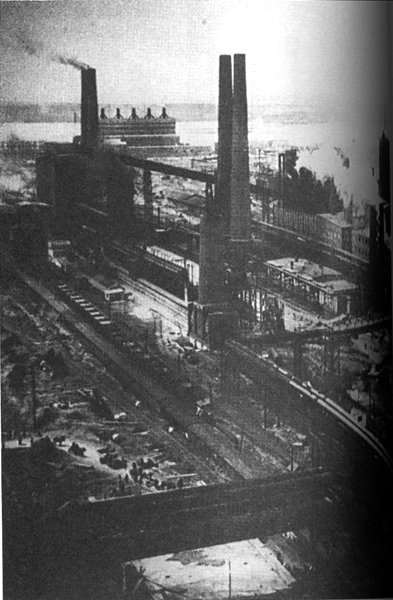
The Magnitostroi steel mill, one of the USSR's great construction projects of the early 1930s and a focus of Komsomol activity.

In 1928 the First Five-year Plan for the national economy was unveiled — a move toward central planning that is remembered by historians as a veritable "revolution from above." A new radical turn of state policy was soon making itself felt with full force.

The 8th Komsomol Congress in May 1928 was addressed by the two top leaders of the VKP(b) of the day — Joseph Stalin and Nikolai Bukharin. Both of these attempted to revive the heroic ethos of the Civil War period to energized the youth movement behind the new socialist offensive. In his 16 May speech at the final session of the congress, Stalin indicated that five years of "muddling through" in "conditions of peaceful development" were coming to a close, warning:

"It is not true that we no longer have class enemies, that they have been smashed and eliminated. No, comrades, our class enemies still exist. They not only exist, they are growing and trying to take action against the Soviet government. That was shown by our procurement difficulties last winter, when the capitalist elements in the countryside tried to sabotage the policy of the Soviet government. It was shown by the Shakhty affair, which was the expression of a joint attack on the Soviet regime launched by international capital and the bourgeoisie in our country. It is shown by numerous facts in the sphere of home and foreign policy... To keep silent about these enemies of the working class would be wrong. To underrate the strength of the class enemies of the working class would be criminal."

Both Stalin and Bukharin, close allies during 1925 and 1926 with agendas for the Communist Party which still overlapped significantly in 1927 and 1928, saw in Komsomol a potential tool for fighting bureaucracy, inefficiency, and corruption "from below" and made a strong play to mobilize the nearly 2 million members of the organization for this purpose at the May 1928 congress.

In the aftermath of its 8th Congress, admissions to Komsomol, particularly in the countryside, began to fall under closer scrutiny as to the class origins of new applicants. The policy of easy admission in order to rapidly build a mass base in the countryside was set aside in favor of closer scrutiny of middle peasants seeking admission to the organization combined with an emphasis on recruitment of poor peasants and agricultural wage-workers. A census of the Komsomol was taken in July 1928 showing a total membership of 2,042,245 members, of whom 35.5% hailed from the industrial working class, 44.8% from the peasantry, 8.9% from the ranks of propertyless agricultural workers, 1.7% craftsman, and 8.9% "others."

As scrutiny over class origins was increased for new members, so, too was investigation of existing members of the organization. In the second half of 1927 and first half of 1928, so-called "alien class" origins became the most common reason for expulsion from Komsomol, surpassing hooliganism, drunkenness, and gambling. This policy was given increased emphasis in 1929, with a further purge (chistka) of "alien class" elements directed in March 1929, resulting in the expulsion of 234,667 members by the summer of 1930.

In spite of continuous attempts to make Komosomol a more urban and traditionally working class organization, on the eve of collectivization the Komsomol remained a substantially larger organization than the Communist Party itself in the countryside, with its 48,000 local cells far outstripping the 18,000 cells of the adult party in May 1928. These played an important role in the brutal process of dekulakization and the consolidation of private agricultural holdings into collective farms.

Similarly, in the rush to build new factories and accelerate industrial production, the youthful enthusiasts of the Komsomol provided a critical human resource. The gigantic Dneiprostroi hydroelectric project was launched in 1927 and completed in 1932, the earliest massive project finished under the first Five-year plan and the forerunner of other massive, centrally-directed construction works of the period. The Komsomol was used as a coordinating force for the large number of young workers on the site, with the local organization starting with 14 members in February 1927 before balooning to a membership of 505 — one quarter of young workers on the site — by September as the project began to spring to life. By the fall of 1928 this number had grown to 750 members, although the organization's penetration level had declined to just 7% of the young workers on site as the size of the project snowballed.

At Dneprostroi and other similar projects, such as the Kuznetskstroi metallurgical works in Siberia, the Gorky automobile factory, the Stalingrad tractor works, and the Magnitostroi steel and iron works, the Komsomol was an important institutional actor bringing young people to the work sites and regulating their activity on the job. As historian Anne Rassweiler notes:

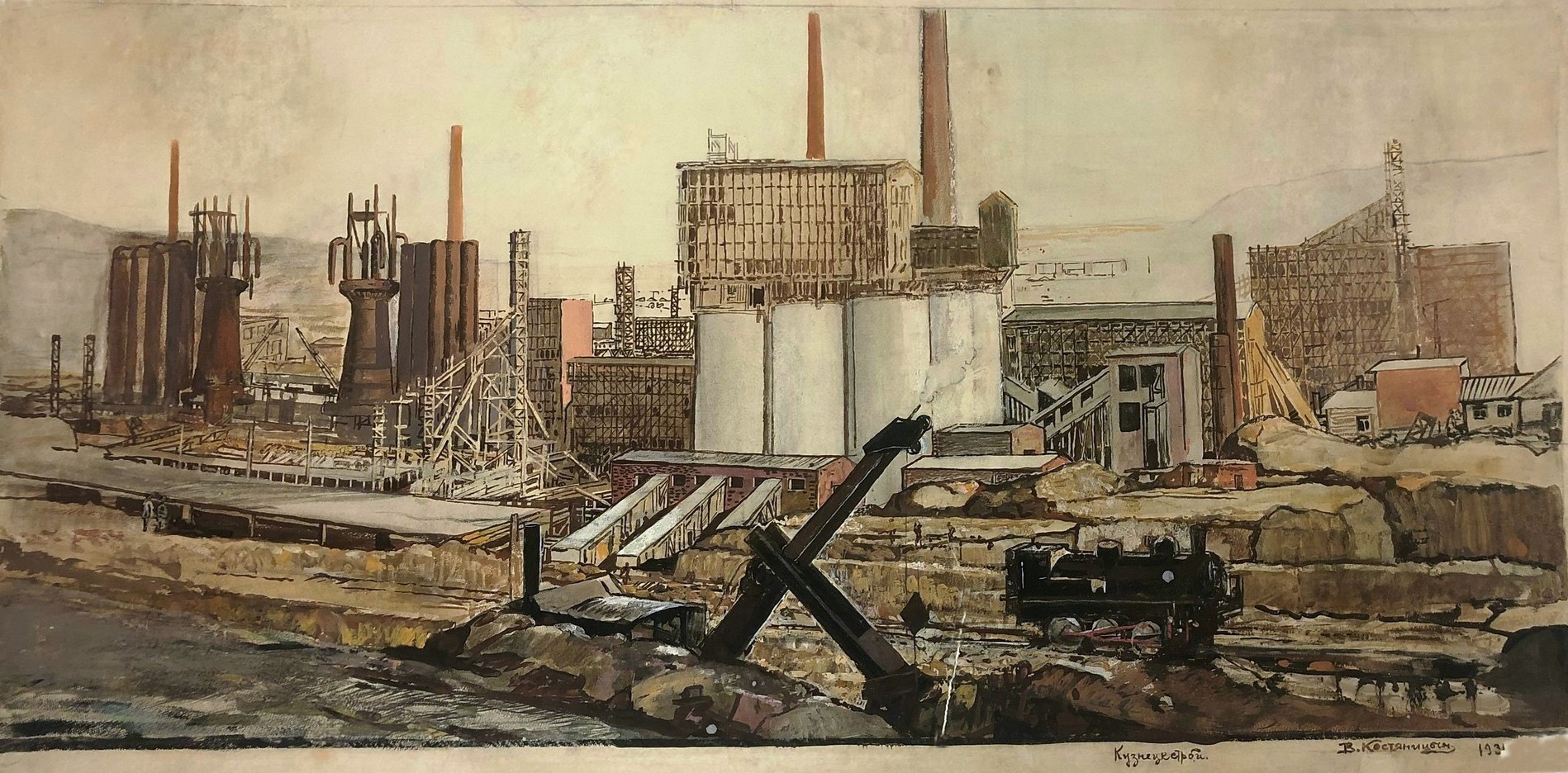
The Kuznetskstroi metallurgical works under construction in 1931.

"It was especially to the Komsomol that the party turned to mobilize young persons to the industrialization drive. Free of parental restraints; encouraged to criticize, investigate, and report on their elders and supervisors as well as their peers; inspired by a popular dream of world revolution and social transformation, they were rewarded for their work, enthusiasm, and loyalty with training and advancement and access to whatever goods and services were available."

In 1929, 7,000 Komsomol cadets were building the tractor factory in Stalingrad (now Volgograd), 57,000 others built factories in the Urals, and 36,500 were assigned to work in the coal mines. The goal was to provide an energetic core group of Bolshevik activists to influence their coworkers in the factories and mines that were at the center of communist ideology.

Magnitostroi in the Urals was another major destination for komsomoltsy from around the country. In 1930 Magnitostroi was declared the first "All-Union Komsomol construction site and representatives of the national newspaper Komsomolskaia Pravda dispatched journalists to the scene to esablish a local newspaper there. True-believers set up night watches protecting the site, served as local constables maintaining order at night, and conducted literacy classes for local workers. The No. 2 furnace at Magnitostroi was named "Komsomolka" in the organization's honor and virtually everyone working on it joined the organization, with so-called "socialist competition" and shockworker methods put into practice to speed the pace of the facility.

Komsomol membership at Magnitostroi leaping from 3,000 on 1 January 1931 to 14,241 one year later. Total population at Magnitostroi approached 200,000 by the end of 1931, making it the largest construction site in the USSR. Living conditions were dismal at this and other construction sites of the First Five-year Plan period, however, and even the most dedicated komsomoltsy were not immune to the squalor. Komsomol membership at Magnitostroi dipped to about 10,000 at the start of 1933, before plummeting to just 5,400 at the start of 1934.

=== Komsomol in the late 1930s ===
About 240,000 collective farms were established during the decade of the 1930s, with an average of about 80 households in each. To these were attached a large auxiliary bureaucracy consisting of chairmen, brigade leaders, accountants, agronomists, and animal specialist, numbering about 2 million people, part of an administrative and support apparatus thataccounted for approximately 30% of able-bodied collective farm workers.

Komsomol members played a significant role in the upper echelons of this rural bureaucracy, accounting for 16.5% of chair and vice-chairs of kolkhozi as well as 31.5% of collective farm accountants by the end of 1937.

Komsomol adopted meritocratic, supposedly class-blind membership policies in 1935, with an associated decline in working-class members and an enlarged place taken by better educated youth.

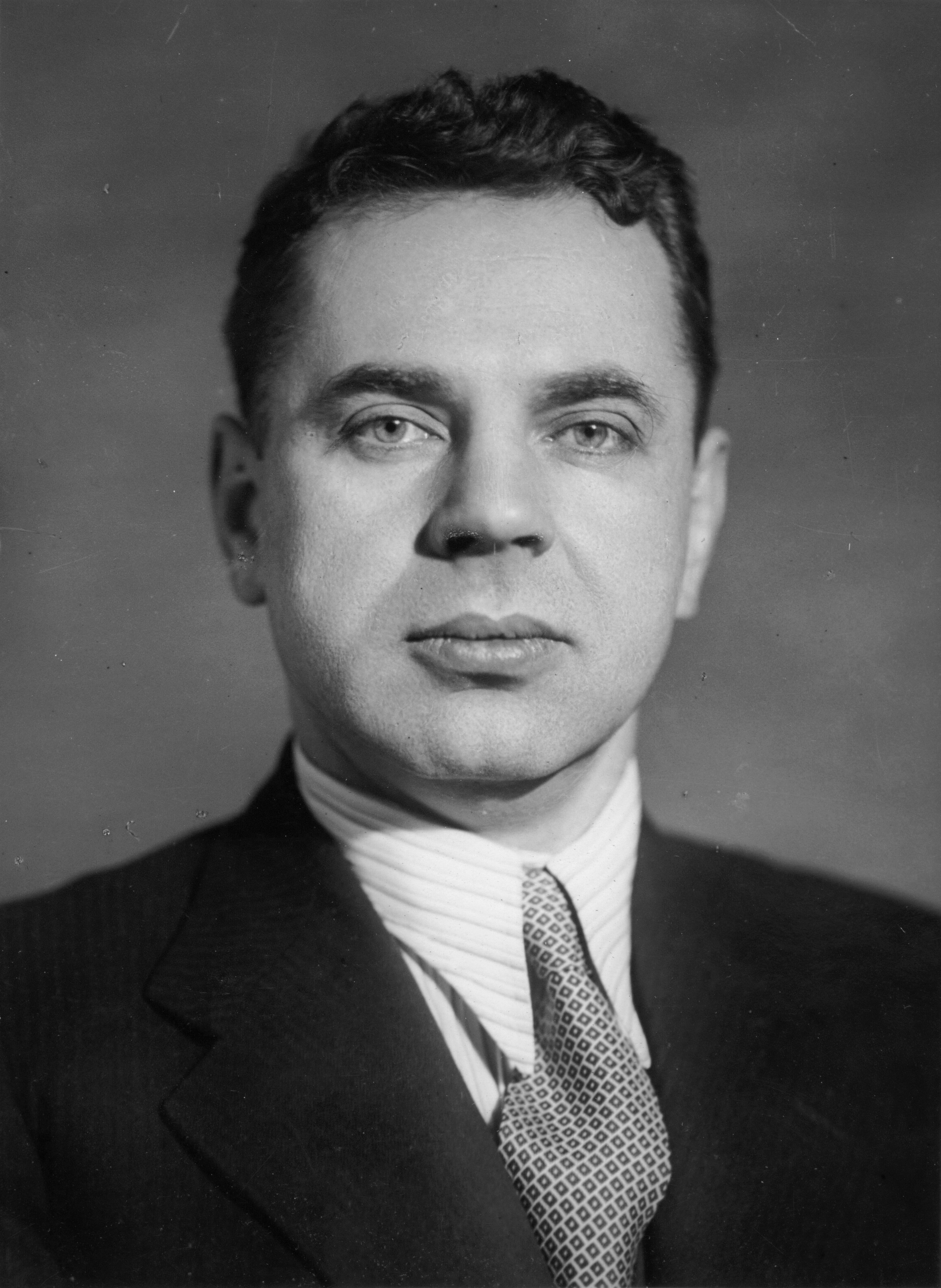
32-year old Nikolai Mikhailov was named first secretary of the VLKSM following the removal of Alexander Kosarev in the last months of the 1937–38 Terror. He would remain in charge of the organization until 1952.

Membership in Komsomol was an critical conduit for membership into the Communist Party. While during the first years of the Bolshevik revolution the Komsomol was one of multiple ways that an individual could gain a party card and the privileges associated with such, by the late 1930s formal organizations of formal "sympathizers" had gone by the wayside, leaving participation in the Komsomol from age 14 as a key rite of passage for those seeking party membership and a political or administrative career.

In 1937 a massive secret police Terror erupted in the USSR, driven by fear of the rise of aggressive enemy regimes in Europe and Asia and domestic security paranoia in the aftermath of the assassination of top Soviet leader Sergei Kirov. Directed by Joseph Stalin, V.M. Molotov, and hardliners in the Politburo, this campaign focused especially upon perceived enemies within the ranks of the Communist Party and the economic and military institutions of the country.

Initially it appeared that the Komsomol would escape without facing serious investigation and repression. However, in July 1937 the leadership of the Komsomol began to be targeted by the NKVD (secret police), with top officials S.A. Saltanov, Dimitry Lukianov, and Evgeny Fainberg among those ensnared through the snowballing process of mass arrest, investigation, and denunciation. A plenum of the Central Committee was held in August 1937 which inserted four new secretaries and eight new members into the bureau of the CC, three of whom had not previously been elected to the CC by the 1936 Congress and were therefore illegally appointed. At the same time, League secretary Alexander Kosarev was elevated in public prominence, elected to the Supreme Soviet of the Soviet Union in December 1937 and chosen to its Presidium the following month. He would stand atop the Lenin's Mausoleum with the Politburo in commemoration of the 20th anniversary of the revolution in October 1938.

As the Terror careened out of control, attempts were belatedly made to apply the brakes. In the spring of 1938, instructions came down to the Komsomol to begin to "unmask" a new enemy — "slanderers" and so-called "overinsurers," who sought to preserve their own safety and position through false denunciation of others. This new course correction ultimately embroiled Kosarev, who was deemed to have suppressed criticism of himself and failed to demonstrate adequate vigilance against internal enemies and was removed at the Central Committee of the Communist Party's behest by the CC of the Komsomol at a plenum held in mid-November 1938. At the 18th Party Congress, a representative of the Komsomol Central Committee would speak thanking the party leadership for having taken steps to destroy the "foul traitorous fascist band of Kosarev."

Between purge and counterpurge during the Terror and the ordinary attrition of members, turnover of the leadership of the Komsomol was almost total between the 10th Congress of 1936 and the start of 1939. From a pool of 93 full and 35 candidate members of the League's Central Committee elected by the congress, only one — E.P. Volkova — was tapped for the 8-person Bureau of the Komsomol in 1938. First secretary Nikolai Mikhailov and the other six members were named to their positions on the Bureau despite not having been previously elected to the CC by the Congress, as the League's organizational rules specified should have been done. After the 10th Congress of the Komsomol in 1936, 13 years would pass until the next gathering of the organization.

Despite the extreme violence involving targeted arrest and executions of Communist Party members during the 1937–38 Terror and the parallel purge of Komsomol leaders themselves, League membership actually rose during the period, increasing from just under 4 million members in 1936 to a shade under 5 million in January 1938. Following the removal of Kosarev and his political associates in the November 1938, admissions to the Komsomol were wildly accelerated, with membership officially reported at 8 million in March 1939.

=== Komsomol during World War II ===
Membership in the Komsomol grew substantially during the war, with admission standards seemingly relaxed and semiactive members less hurriedly removed from the rolls. With millions of young Soviets enrolled in the ranks of the Red Army during the war and others focused on the civilian war effort, indoctrination and recruitment was less difficult than it was in the years before the war. During the first 15 months of the war, two million new members were accepted into Komsomol ranks.

During the war years, Soviet schoolchildren, frequently with Komsomol members taking a leading role, contributed to the war effort collecting millions of tons of scrap metal, gathering glass containers for manufacture of Molotov cocktails, collecting medicinal herbs and wild plant foods, accumulating books to reestablish destroyed libraries, and going door-to-door soliciting funds for various war and social relief projects.

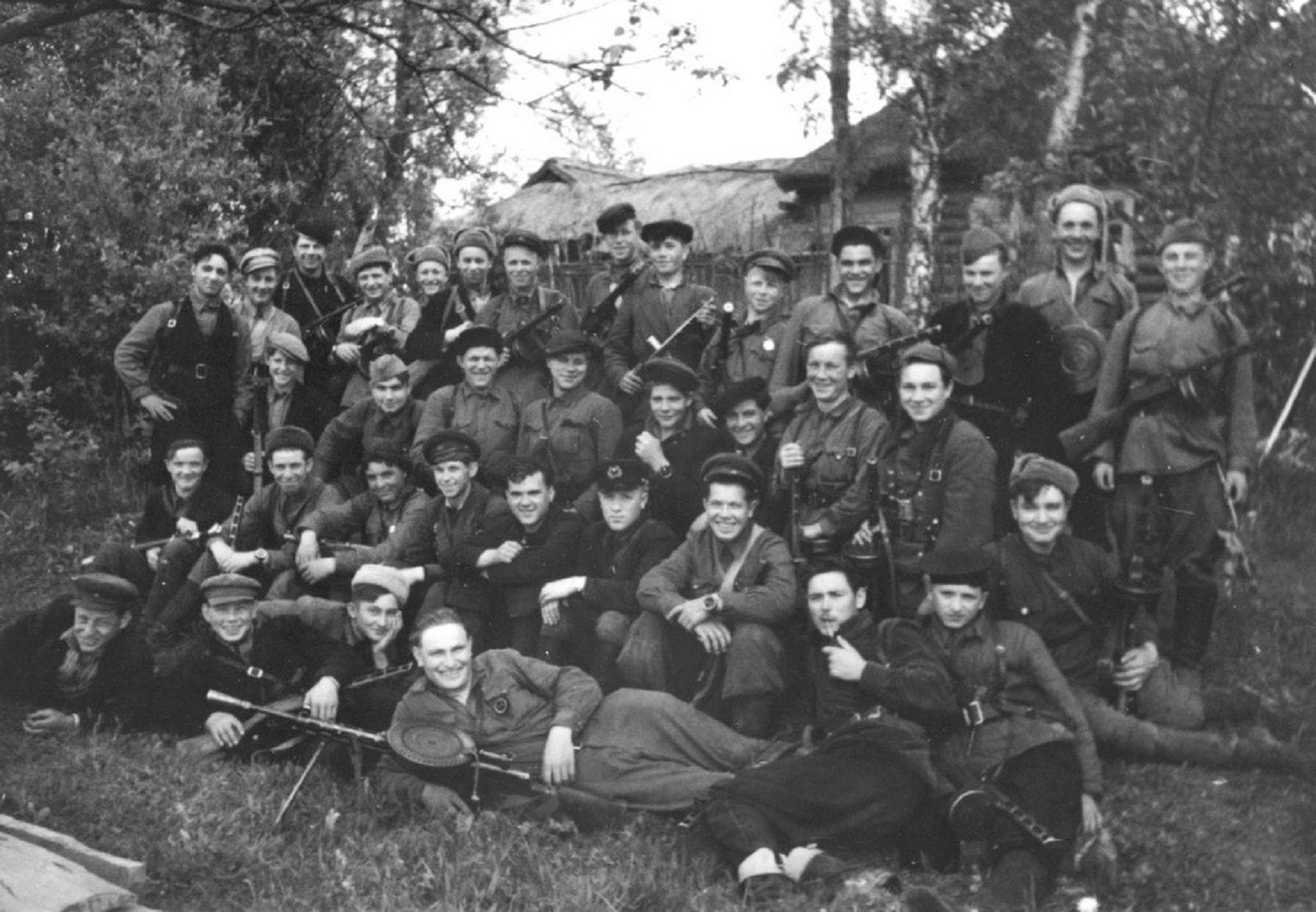
Group of Komsomoltsy in Leningrad oblast, 1942.

In blockaded Leningrad, Komsomol members and other students worked alongside adults digging trenches, anti-tank ditches, and building barricades. About 60,000 Leningrad students were involved helping construct the city's defenses during the summer of 1941.

The entry age of the Komsomol was lowered from 16 to 14 in November 1942. This change was partially enacted to enable the organization to form cells in 7-year and industrial schools, according to a report in Komsomolskaia pravda. Komsomoltsy were expected to be model students, taking on leadership roles and helping to sustain classroom discipline under the close supervision of local party units — a far cry from the frequently unorganized anti-religious rowdyism of two decades earlier.

On October 29, 1943, the Komsomol celebrated its 25th anniversary. At this time it was reported that since the beginning of the war 5,351,247 new members had been admitted to the organization, with 1,379,766 VLKSM members promoted to membership in the Communist Party. Just shy of half of all new members of the Communist Party passed through Komsomol ranks, it was reported. By the end of the war, membership was said to have reached an all-too-round figure of 15,000,000.

Through the early 1940s, Komsomol was treated as a non-territorial subsection, with income from its dues contributing directly to the annual budget of the Communist Party. During the war this stream of funds to the general party coffers was attenuated, however, falling from about 5 percent of the total party budget to less than 1 percent in 1943 and disappearing completely by the end of the war. Instead of pooling its dues income with the CPSU, the organization was instead granted permission to maintain its own parallel budget, while remaining under the supervision and direction of the adult organization.

=== Komsomol during the late Stalin period ===
The Communist Party of the Soviet Union rebuilt its membership from the ground up in the years after World War II, although the membership "cleansing" (chistka) was in no way comparable to the murderous blood purge of arrests and executions of the pre-war Terror. Entry into the party was made more difficult and the number of new admissions was offset by the steady stream of expulsions during the years 1945–50. This pattern of expulsion and increased scrutiny was even more pronounced in the Komsomol, which saw its ranks chopped from 15 million in October 1945 to just 9 million in March 1949.

With the war in Europe coming to a formal end, Komsomol emphasis shifted from military preparedness towards economic reconstruction. The Komsomol was marshaled in 1946 to play a key role in the rebuilding of 15 cities destroyed during the Nazi invasion, with work towards the restoration of the gutted shell of Stalingrad advanced as a separate and particularly emphasized project.

The Komsomol was also mobilized to push for fulfillment of the first Five-Year Plan of the postwar era, which ran from 1946–1950. The organization was also employed for the promotion of national elections to the Supreme Soviet, culminating in a grand perfomative vote held on February 10, 1946, which elected the single official slate to office.

The previous practice of probationary membership was virtually eliminated in the years of World War II and postwar reconstruction, with only 2,790 of the approximately 1.7 million members accepted in 1947 and 1,617 of the 1.9 million members in 1948 forced to participate on a probationary basis. Despite this large influx, total membership grew slowly.

There was little pretext of Komsomol independence during the interval including the Terror and World War II and reconstruction, as nearly 13 years passed between Congresses of the organization — nominally the way that the VLKSM was to govern itself.

=== Komsomol during the Khrushchev period ===
During the period of Soviet history in which Nikita Khrushchev exerted dominance as General Secretary of the Communist Party, the Komsomol was mobilized for one of the biggest projects of the era, the opening up of previously fallow or unplowed "virgin lands" in Kazakhstan to agriculture.

Komsomol pin for participation in Khrushchev's Virgin lands program of 1954–1960.

=== Komsomol during the Brezhnev period ===
At its largest, during the 1970s, the Komsomol had tens of millions of members.

While Komsomol had little direct influence on the Communist Party or on the government of the Soviet Union, it nonetheless played an important role as a mechanism for inculcating the values of the party to the younger generation, producing new cadres for the party. The Komsomol also served as a mobile pool of labor and political activism, with the ability to relocate to areas of high-priority at short notice.

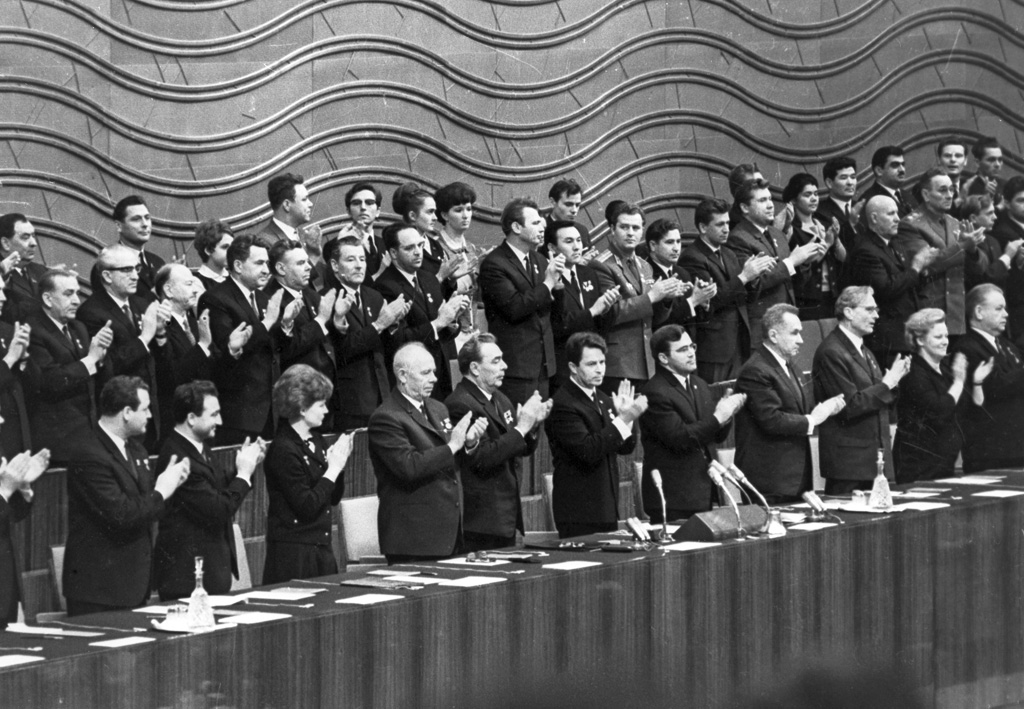
Plenary session of the Central Committee of the Young Communist League in 1968, with Communist Party General Secretary Leonid Brezhnev presiding

Nowhere was the Komsomol mobilized so extensively during the late Soviet period than in the construction of the Baikal–Amur Mainline (BAM), called by one of its historians "the last example of Soviet 'gigantomania'," part of a "long progression of Soviet colossal schemes that the party used to herald the accomplishments of state socialism."

Recalling such massive construction projects as Magnitogorsk, the Turkestan–Siberia Railway, the Moscow Metro, and the Belomor Canal, BAM was a multi-year endeavor to build a rail line from Lake Baikal in central Siberia to the Amur River in the Soviet far east — a distance of more than 4,200 kilometers (2,300 miles) carved through inhospitable conditions. Although no definitive cost figure for the project exists, an estimated 1% of the USSR's gross national product was invested annually from 1974 to 1984 in building the line. Approximately 300 million cubic meters of earth was moved, thousands of bridges constructed, and nearly two dozen tunnels bored during the process of building the BAM line.

Soviet leaders, including especially General Secretary of the Communist Party Leonid Brezhnev, saw a dual purpose in the BAM project. In terms of economics, the rail line was anticipated to open up territorial development and access to resources in the eastern third of the USSR, as well as provide a more efficient means for movement of goods from Eastern Europe as well as Soviet oil and wood products to the rapidly developing nations of the Pacific rim. Similarly, the line would facilitate the importation of manufactured goods, such as electronics, from Asia to the USSR.

There was also a political component, however, in which the flagship project of BAM was to restore national pride and provide an example of the organizational potential of so-called "developed socialism."

BAM's construction force was overwhelmingly youthful, with approximately two-thirds of the 500,000 bamovtsy (BAMers) who would work on the project members of the Komsomol. This connection was explicit. Soon after its launch in 1974, the project was designated as an All-Union Komsomol Shockwork Project. (Note: Vsesoiuznaia Komsomolskai udarnaia stroika.) The project in a very real sense became part of the Komsomol's organizational purview, with the VLKSM responsible for assembling the labor pool and political activities of those participating in the arduous Siberian work project.

Komsomol was to oversee all BAM production, making sure that its officials and members were prominently placed at every level of the project's administrative apparatus. Joining the Komsomol at the task were a considerable number of the drafted members of the Red Army — a group estimated to account for about 25% of the labor pool, with railroad and construction specialists accounting for the remainder. Party leader Brezhnev was adamant that no coerced prison labor would be used in the project — "clean hands only," in his words — a promise which archives indicate was kept throughout the duration of the project.

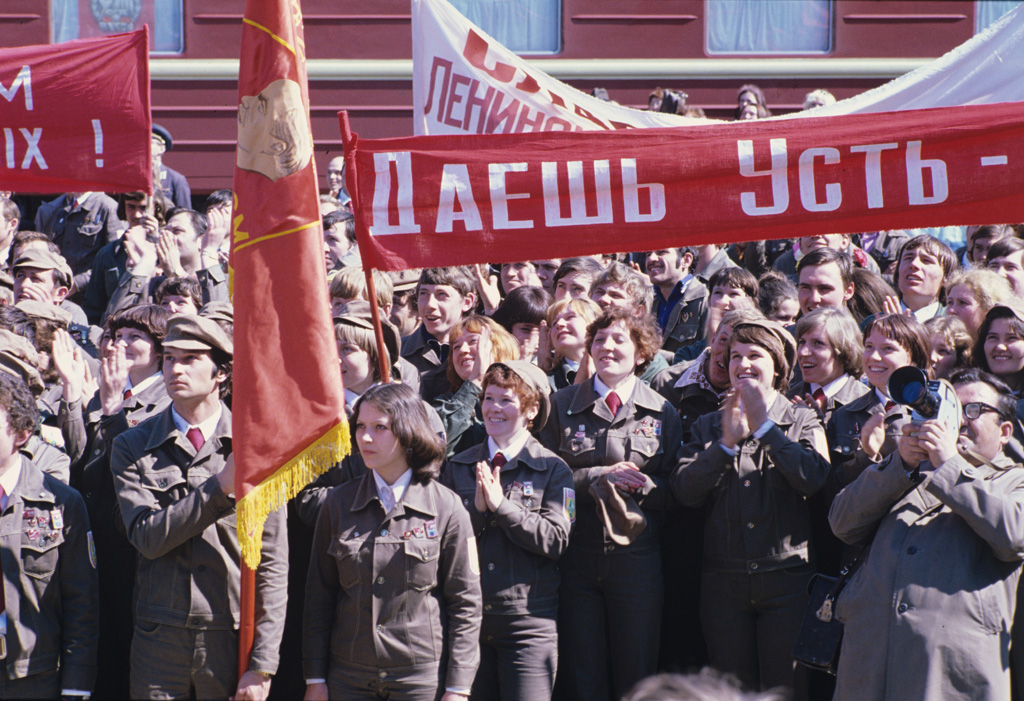
Komsomol rally for arrival of a new BAM construction team, Ust-Ilimsk, Irkutsk Region, 1979.

Among BAM workers, women are estimated to have comprised fully 40% of the work force, nearly half of whom were under age 20. There was, again, purpose to this female orientation, with Communist Party officials seeking to expand permanent settlement in the so-called "BAM zone" and seeing the presence of women for family formation as a necessary piece of this puzzle. Party officials left this quiet part unsaid, however, emphasizing exotic locale, enhanced pay opportunities, and the patriotic heroism of BAM workers — a place far from home where independence and freedom could be achieved.

Nearly 80% of the women working on BAM worked in all-female detachments, which began their stint on the railway making a public affirmation of the following mission statement:

"I am a Komsomol woman. This gives me the right to choose my own career path. The Komsomol membership card is a mandate, one that opens the door to true happiness, real happiness both at work and leisure. I believe in the Komsomol and I want it to believe in me."

The regime also conducted an ongoing propaganda offensive extolling female BAMers, emphasizing such virtues as industriousness, humility, and selflessness — women who worked hard while retaining their femininity.

The reality faced by female BAM workers was less than idyllic. Living and working conditions proved primitive and difficult. The young women also faced a sexist, male-dominated social culture starkly at odds with the new world of mutual respect and gender equality intimated by official propaganda. Women were further frequently consigned to lower-paying support jobs while men dominated higher-paying managerial posts. In 1984, as the BAM project came to a close, a study indicated that 85% of jobs paying less than 100 rubles a month were held by women while, by way of contrast, over 80% of those paying more than 300 rubles were held by men.

=== Komsomol during perestroika ===
Komsomol membership card from 1967. The right side of the booklet marks off monthly dues payments.

During the early phases of perestroika in the mid-1980s, when the Soviet authorities began cautiously introducing private enterprise, the Komsomol received privileges with respect to initiating businesses, with the motivation of giving youth a better chance. The government, unions and the Komsomol jointly introduced Centers for Scientific and Technical Creativity for Youth (1987). At the same time, many Komsomol managers joined and directed the Russian Regional and State Anti-Monopoly Committees. Folklore quickly coined a motto: "The Komsomol is a school of Capitalism", hinting at Vladimir Lenin's "Trade unions are a school of Communism".

The 20th Congress of the Komsomol, held in April 1987, altered the rules of the organization to represent a market orientation. However, the reforms of the 20th Congress eventually destroyed the Komsomol, with lack of purpose and the waning of interest, membership, and quality of membership. At the 22nd Komsomol Congress of September 1991, held in the immediate aftermath of the August 1991 coup attempt by Communist hardliners, the organization was formally disbanded.

The Komsomol's newspaper, Komsomolskaya Pravda, outlived the organization and remains a prominent Moscow newspaper under the same name in Putin's Russia through 2026.

== Young women in the Komsomol ==
The ideology of the new Soviet government under Vladimir Lenin strove to break down societal barriers believed to be harmful to the goal of unity. Specifically, it hoped to elevate women to a level of equality with men. The Komsomol pushed hard to recruit young women and raise them in this new consciousness. In the period of the early 1920s, women primarily stayed at home and performed the majority of housework. Membership of the Komsomol seemed to offer a doorway into public life at a level previously unseen by women of the time. Young women enthusiastically joined as they were finally given a chance to detach themselves from the traditional patriarchal structure. Moreover, they were drawn to the Komsomol because it promised them an education during a time when young girls were deprived of a proper one in favor of preparing them for household duties. The Soviets encouraged women to take an active role in the new system and participate in the same activities and work as their male counterparts.

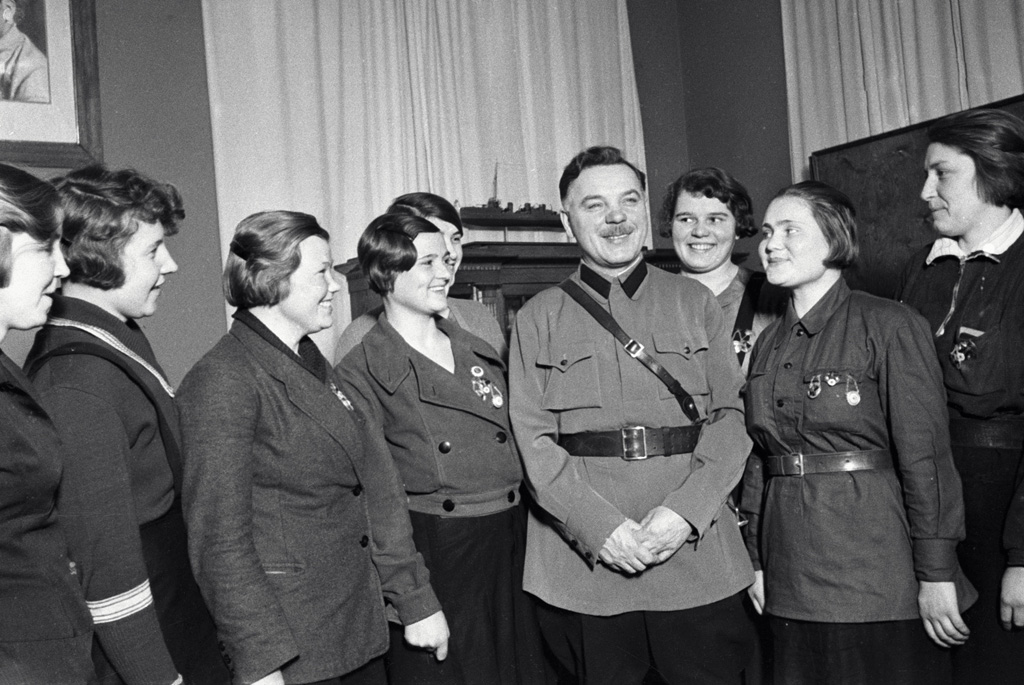
Kliment Voroshilov at a meeting with Komsomol members (1935)

Major conflicts surfaced when the government took these new steps. The Bolshevik Party was not the most popular at the time, and much of the rest of the nation wished to hold onto their patriarchal values. Parents hesitated to allow their daughters to join the youth organization, because "the Komsomol seemed like an immoral organization, for it removed young girls from adult control, and then required them to attend meetings held at night." Soviet citizens felt that if they released their hold on their children, they would be corrupted by the Komsomol's influence. They also worried that if their daughters became independent and promiscuous, then no man would want to marry them. Moreover, parents wondered who would take care of the home if all the young women left home to join the Komsomol.

Women, generally, were also unprepared for the realities of the workforce. The ancient structure of female subordination allowed for little in terms of work experience. Men had been given better education and were traditionally raised to take part in military and industry. Therefore, they had a much wider range of opportunity than women whose only role had been caretaking. Here lies the irony of the government's efforts: the Komsomol tried desperately to empower young women to achieve equality, yet women's perceptions of themselves worsened because they were now being directly compared to their much more prepared counterparts.

Even though the Communist Party preached and demanded equality, men dominated both the governing body and the Komsomol's leadership. Upward mobility, contrary to initial belief, was incredibly hard for women to achieve. In addition, the organization openly encouraged its female members to pursue positions of teaching and nurturing of young Soviets.

=== Recruitment of peasant women ===
The Komsomol also found it difficult to recruit and motivate young women amongst the rural populations. During NEP, this demographic represented only 8% of the organization. Poor membership numbers from rural areas were the result of several different factors. By 1925, the failure to implement equality in the Komsomol was evident to young rural women, society still perceiving them to be inferior both because they were women and because they came from the peasant class. Various women's organizations criticized the Komsomol for these failures.

Chiefly, the Women's Bureau of the Communist Party, known as Zhenotdel, openly criticized the youth organization. Komsomol women were provided little in the way of programs that might encourage their involvement. Annual conferences, where organization leaders gathered to discuss topics of interest to female members, were in fact the only activities in which early Komsomol women took part. The Youth League therefore made concerted efforts to resolve these issues and raise membership amongst peasant women.

== Honours ==
The Komsomol received three Orders of Lenin, one Order of the Red Banner, one Order of the Red Banner of Labour, and one Order of the October Revolution. The asteroid 1283 Komsomolia is named after the Komsomol, as is Komsomolets Island in the Arctic Ocean. The Komsomolets armored tractor was a model used during the Second World War, while the first Soviet nuclear submarine was K-3 Leninsky Komsomol; a later submarine was called K-278 Komsomolets.

There are also several towns and cities named Komsomolsky, Komsomolets or Komsomolsk.

== Legacy ==
Pioneering Western Sovietology during the Cold War supposed the Komsomol to be the epitomy of "Youth under Dictatorship." It was something "of an intensity unmatched by its now defunct Fascist and Nazi rivals," opined pioneering American Soviet specialist Merle Fainsod in the first edition of his foundational textbook, How Russia is Ruled [1953].

== Congresses and membership figures ==
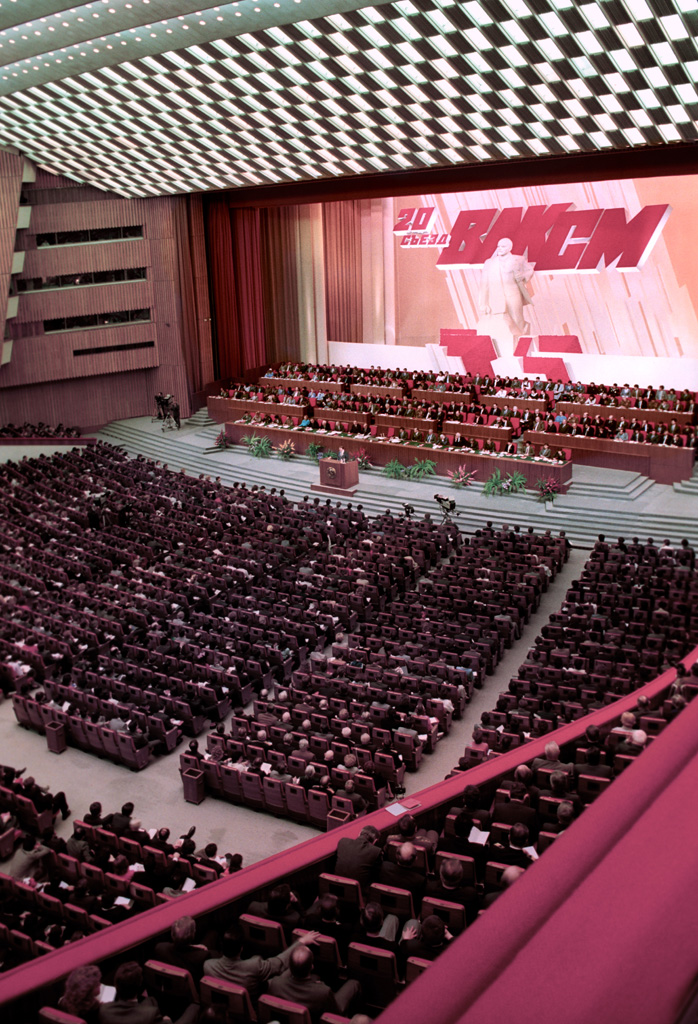
20th Congress Komsomol, Moscow, April 1987.

Event	Date	Delegates	Membership	Footnotes
1st Congress	29 Oct. – 4 Nov. 1918	176	22,100	
2nd Congress	5–8 October 1919	348 + 81 advisory	96,096	
3rd Congress	2–10 October 1920		482,000	
4th Congress	21–28 September 1921	471	400,000	
5th Congress	11–19 October 1922	450	247,000	
—	1 January 1923	—	284,544	
—	1 January 1924	—	406,660	
6th Congress	12–18 July 1924	730	840,000	
—	1 January 1925	—	1,020,456	
—	1 July 1925	—	1,424,178	
7th Congress	11–22 March 1926	1,177	1,750,000	
8th Congress	5–16 May 1928	656 + 428 advisory	1,968,000	
9th Congress	16–26 January 1931	767	3,000,000	
10th Congress	10–21 April 1936	801	3,981,777	
11th Congress	29 March – 7 April 1949	1,362	9,283,289	
12th Congress	19–27 March 1954	1,334	18,825,327	
13th Congress	15–18 April 1958			
14th Congress	16–20 April 1962	"nearly 4,000"		
15th Congress	17–21 May 1966	"nearly 4,000"		
16th Congress	26–30 May 1970			
17th Congress	23–27 April 1974			
18th Congress	25–28 April 1978			
19th Congress	18–21 May 1982			
20th Congress	15–18 April 1987			
21st Congress	11–18 April 1990			
22nd Congress	27–28 September 1991			

== Leaders (First Secretary of the Central Committee) ==
- Yefim Tsetlin (1918–1919)
- Oscar Ryvkin (1918–1921)
- Lazar Shatskin (1921–1922)
- Pyotr Smorodin (1922–1924)
- Nikolai Chaplin (1924–1928)
- Alexander Milchakov (1928–1929)
- Aleksandr Kosarev (1929–1938)
- Nikolai Mikhailov (1938–1952)
- Aleksandr Shelepin (1952–1958)
- Vladimir Semichastny (1958–1959)
- Sergei Pavlov (1959–1968)
- Yevgeny Tyazhelnikov (1968–1977)
- Boris Pastukhov (1977–1982)
- Viktor Mishin (1982–1986)
- Viktor Mironenko (1986–1990)
- Vladimir Zyukin (1990–1991)

== Branches ==
- Armenian SSR: Հայաստանի լենինյան կոմունիստական երիտասարդական միություն, ՀԼԿԵՄ
- Azerbaijan SSR: Azərbaycan Lenin Kommunist Gənclər İttifaqı (Азәрбајҹан Ленин Коммунист Ҝәнҹләр Иттифагы), ALKGİ (АЛКҜИ)
- Byelorussian SSR: Ленінскі Камуністычны саюз моладзі Беларусі, ЛКСМБ
- Estonian SSR: Eestimaa Leninlik Kommunistlik Noorsooühing, ELKNÜ
- Georgian SSR: ka:საქართველოს ახალგაზრდა ლენინური კომუნისტური კავშირი
- Karelo-Finnish SSR: Ленинский коммунистический союз молодежи Карело-Финской ССР, ЛКСМ КФССР
- Kazakh SSR:
- Kirghiz SSR:
- Latvian SSR: Latvijas Ļeņina Komunistiskā Jaunatnes Savienība, LĻKJS
- Lithuanian SSR: Lietuvos Lenino komunistinė jaunimo sąjunga, LLKJS
- Moldavian SSR: UTCLM (abbreviation)
- Russian SFSR: Ленинский коммунистический союз молодёжи РСФСР, ЛКСМ РСФСР
- Tajik SSR:
- Turkmen SSR:
- Ukrainian SSR: Ленінська Комуністична спілка молоді України, ЛКСМУ)
- Uzbek SSR: Ўзбекистон Ленинчи коммунистик ёшлар союзи, OʻzLKSM

=== Public safety ===
- Voluntary People's Druzhina

=== Children's organization ===
- Young Pioneer organization of the Soviet Union

== See also ==
- Communist Youth League of China
- Ho Chi Minh Communist Youth Union
