= Central Committee of the Komsomol =

Executive Leadership of the Komsomol

Central Committee of the Komsomol Центральный комитет ВЛКСМ
- Emblem of the Komsomol

Information
- First Secretary: Yefim Tsetlin (first); Vladimir Zyukin (last)
- Parent: Central Committee of the Communist Party of the Soviet Union

The Central Committee of the Komsomol (Russian: Центральный комитет ВЛКСМ, Tsentral'niy komitet VLKSM) was the executive leadership of the All-Union Leninist Young Communist League, commonly known as the Komsomol. According to the Komsomol Charter adopted at the 14th Congress of the Komsomol (1962), the Central Committee "directs the entire work of the Komsomol, local Komsomol bodies, represents the Komsomol in state and public institutions and organizations, approves the editorial board of the central body - Komsomolskaya Pravda and other editorial offices, distributes the Komsomol budget and monitors its implementation." The Central Committee of the Komsomol was dissolved on September 28, 1991, along with the Komsomol organization itself.

== Organization ==
The Central Committee was elected at Komsomol congresses by secret ballot. The Central Committee consisted of full members who could cast a vote and candidate members who had an advisory vote during plenary sessions. The Central Committee of the Komsomol elected the First Secretary of the Central Committee (de facto leader of the Komsomol), the Bureau, and the Sectretariat.

== Congresses ==
During its 73-year history, the Central Committee of the Komsomol held a total of 22 congresses. Initially, congresses were held every year but after 1922 they were held less frequently.

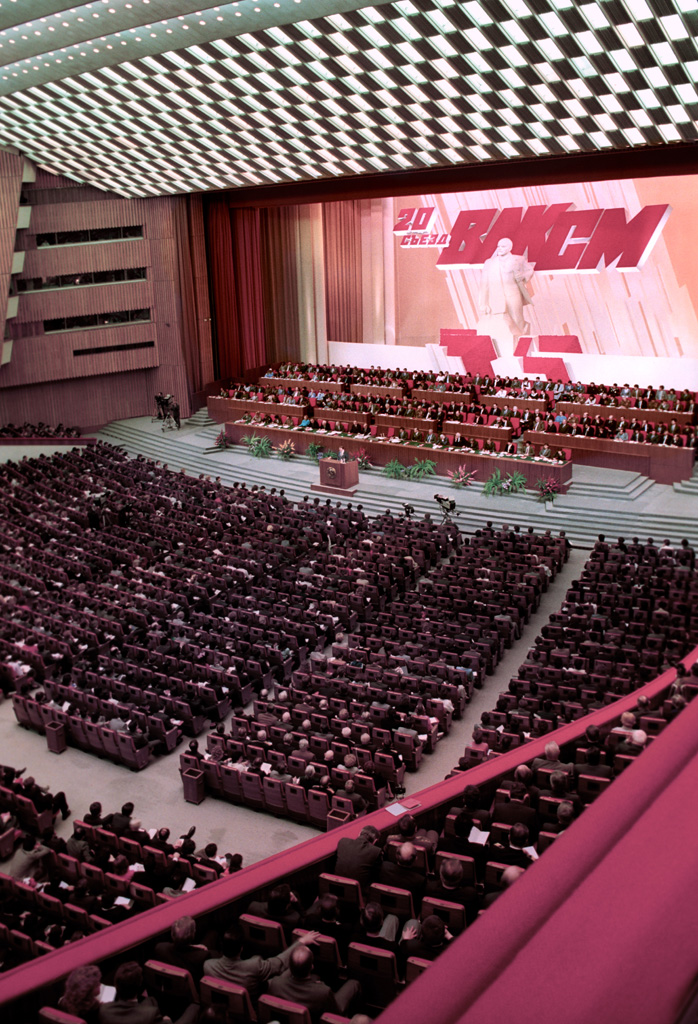
20th Congress of the Komsomol (1987)

Congress	Dates Held	Resolution(s)
Congresses of the Central Committee of the Komsomol
1st Congress	29 October - 4 November 1918	The unification of youth communist organizations into a centralized single organization. Creation of Komsomol.
2nd Congress	5 October - 8 October 1919	Creation of the Young Communist International in order to appeal to the young international proletariat.
3rd Congress	2 October - 10 October 1920	The tasks of socialist construction and communist education of youth, the restoration of the national economy destroyed during the war years are defined. A new edition of the charter of the Komsomol was adopted.
4th Congress	21 September - 28 September 1921	A new edition of the charter of the Komsomol was adopted.
5th Congress	11 October - 17 October 1922	
6th Congress	12 July - 18 July 1924	Name changed in Russian from RKSM to RLKSM.
7th Congress	11 March - 22 March 1926	Support for party line for the fight against Trotskyism.
8th Congress	5 May - 16 May 1928	
9th Congress	16 January - 26 January 1931	
10th Congress	11 April - 21 April 1936	A new version of the Komsomol charter was adopted.
11th Congress	29 March - 7 April 1949	
12th Congress	19 March - 27 March 1954	A new version of the Komsomol charter was adopted.
13th Congress	15 April - 18 April 1958	Announcement of the Abakan-Taishet Railway shock construction project.
14th Congress	16 April - 20 April 1962	A new version of the Komsomol charter was adopted.
15th Congress	17 May - 21 May 1966	
16th Congress	26 May - 30 May 1970	
17th Congress	23 April - 27 April 1974	Announcement of the Baikal-Amur Railway shock construction project
18th Congress	25 April - 28 April 1978	
19th Congress	18 May - 21 May 1982	The Youth Residential Complex project program was adopted.
20th Congress	15 April - 18 April 1987	A new version of the Komsomol charter was adopted.
21st Congress	11 April - 18 April 1990	A new version of the Komsomol charter was adopted.
22nd Congress	27 September - 28 September 1991	The Komsomol was officially dissolved.

== First Secretaries of the Komsomol ==
No.	Picture	Name (Birth–Death)	Took office	Left office	Political party
First Secretaries of the Komsomol
1		Yefim Tsetlin (1898–1937)	4 November 1918	17 July 1919	Bolshevik Party (RCP(b))
2		Oscar Ryvkin (1899–1937)	17 July 1919	10 October 1920	Bolshevik Party (RCP(b))
3		Lazar Shatskin (1902–1937)	10 October 1920	28 September 1921	Bolshevik Party (RCP(b))
4		Pyotr Smorodin (1897–1939)	28 September 1921	18 July 1924	Bolshevik Party (RCP(b))
5		Nikolai Chaplin (1902–1938)	18 July 1924	16 May 1928	VKP(b)
6		Alexander Milchakov (1903–1973)	17 May 1928	24 March 1929	VKP(b)
7		Aleksandr Kosarev (1903–1939)	24 March 1929	23 November 1938	VKP(b)
8		Nikolai Mikhailov (1906–1982)	23 November 1938	30 October 1952	CPSU
9		Alexander Shelepin (1918–1994)	30 October 1952	18 April 1958	CPSU
10		Vladimir Semichastny (1924–2001)	18 April 1958	25 March 1959	CPSU
11		Sergey Pavlov (1929–1993)	25 March 1959	12 June 1968	CPSU
12		Yevgeny Tyazhelnikov (1928–2020)	12 June 1968	27 May 1977	CPSU
13		Boris Pastukhov (1933–2021)	27 May 1977	6 December 1982	CPSU
14		Viktor Mishin (born 1943)	6 December 1982	19 July 1986	CPSU
15		Viktor Mironenko (born 1953)	19 July 1986	18 April 1990	CPSU
16		Vladimir Zyukin (born 1954)	18 April 1990	27 September 1991	CPSU

== See also ==
- Komsomol
- Komsomolskaya Pravda
