= Rognedinsky District =

Rognedinsky District Рогнединский район (Russian)
- District
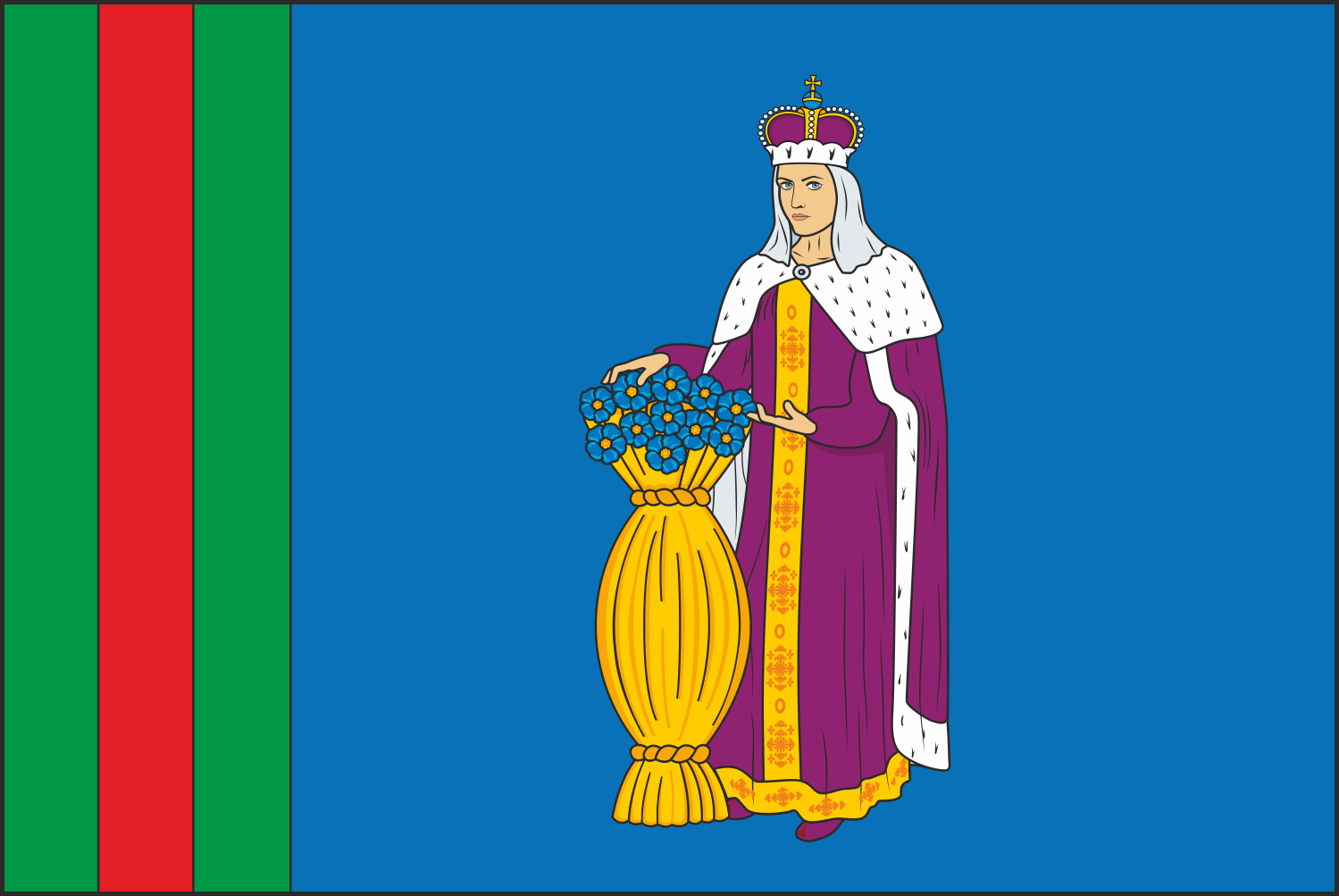
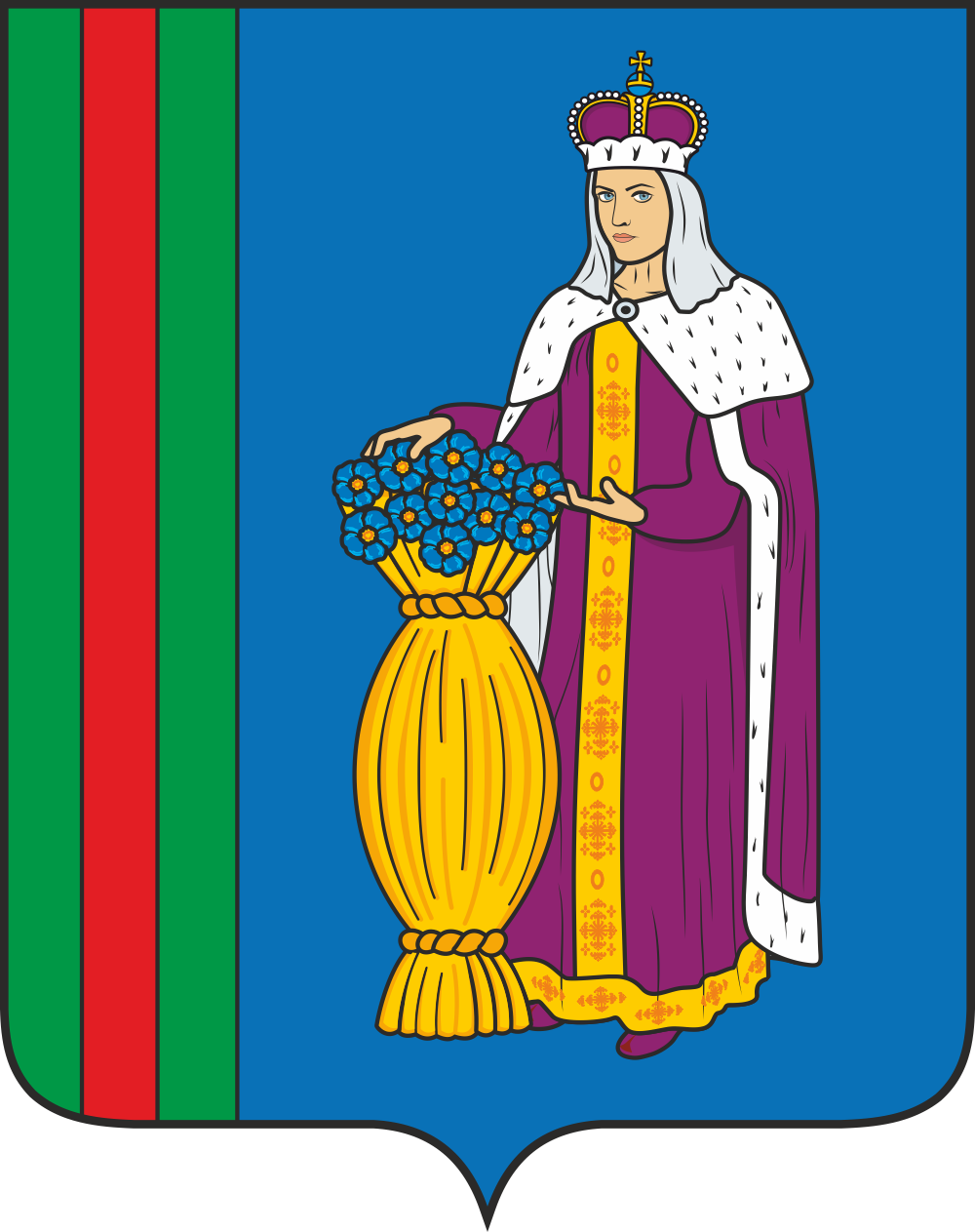
- Flag Coat of arms
- Location of Rognedinsky District in Bryansk Oblast
- Coordinates: 53°48′00″N 33°33′37″E
- Country: Russia
- Federal subject: Bryansk Oblast
- Administrative center: Rognedino

Area
  - Total: 1,051 km^{2} (406 sq mi)

Population (2010 Census)
  - Total: 7,284
  - Density: 6.931/km^{2} (17.95/sq mi)
  - Urban: 43.4%
  - Rural: 56.6%

Administrative structure
  - Administrative divisions: 1 Settlement administrative okrugs, 5 Rural administrative okrugs
  - Inhabited localities: 1 urban-type settlements, 87 rural localities

Municipal structure
  - Municipally incorporated as: Rognedinsky Municipal District
  - Municipal divisions: 1 urban settlements, 5 rural settlements
- Time zone: UTC+3 (MSK)
- OKTMO ID: 15646000
- Website: http://www.rognedino.ru/

Rognedinsky District (Russian: Рогне́динский райо́н) is an administrative and municipal district (raion), one of the twenty-seven in Bryansk Oblast, Russia. It is located in the north of the oblast. The area of the district is 1,051 square kilometers (406 sq mi). Its administrative center is the urban locality (a work settlement) of Rognedino. Population: 6,202 (2021 census); 7,284 (2010 census); 8,952 (2002 Census); 11,014 (1989 Soviet census). The population of Rognedino accounts for 44.7% of the district's total population.
