= Oscar Ryvkin =

Soviet politician

- Оскар Рывкин

First Secretary of the Krasnodar City Committee of the Communist Party of the Soviet Union
- In office 1934 – January 1937

First Secretary of the Vyksa City Committee of the Communist Party of the Soviet Union
- In office 1925–1928

First Secretary of the Central Committee of the Komsomol
- In office 17 July 1919 – 10 October 1920
- Preceded by: Yefim Tsetlin
- Succeeded by: Lazar Shatskin

Member of the Central Control Commission of the Communist Party of the Soviet Union
- In office 19 December 1927 – 26 January 1934

Personal details
- Born: Oscar Lvovich Ryvkin; 4 January 1899 Saint Petersburg, Russian Empire
- Died: 7 August 1937 (aged 38) Soviet Union
- Citizenship: Soviet Union; Russian Empire (previously)
- Party: CPSU (1917–1937)
- Education: Institute of Red Professors

Military service
- Allegiance: Russian Soviet Federative Socialist Republic
- Branch/service: Workers' and Peasants' Red Army
- Years of service: 1918–1920
- Rank: Private
- Battles/wars: Russian Civil War

Oscar Lvovich Ryvkin (Russian: Оскар Львович Рывкин; 4 January 1899 – 7 August 1937) also known by his alias O. Skar was a Soviet politician who served in various positions including First Secretary of the Central Committee of the Komsomol, First Secretary of the Krasnodar City Committee of the Communist Party of the Soviet Union, and a member of the Central Control Commission.

== Early life and education ==
Oscar Ryvkin was born on January 4, 1899, to a Jewish family in Saint Petersburg in the Russian Empire. When he was young, Ryvkin worked as a student in a pharmacy and in a printing house. He graduated from the Institute of Red Professors in 1934.

== Political career ==
Ryvkin joined the Russian Social Democratic Labour Party (Bolshevik) in March 1917. After the February Revolution, he joined the Red Guards as a fighter and served as the Secretary of the Petrograd Socialist Union of Workers' Youth. At the time, he was also a member of the editorial board of the first youth Bolshevik magazine, Young Proletarian.

On June 19, 1917, Ryvkin published an article in Pravda under his pseudonym O. Skar called "An Open Letter to Comrades, Workers, and Soldiers." In the article, Ryvkin called for the cancelling of the Provisional Government's resolution that only allowed citizens older than twenty-one years old to vote. He said, "I urge the comrades of workers and women workers of eighteen to twenty years old to organize in a powerful union for the protection of electoral rights, and to be able to defend their rights at the right time."

Members of the Presidium of the First All-Russian Congress of Unions of Workers and Peasants (from left to right): Mikhail Dugachev, M. Akhmanov, P. Forvin, Lazar Shatskin, Aleksandr Bezymensky, Yefim Tsetlin, Oscar Ryvkin, Yevgenia Herr

Ryvkin directly participated in the October Revolution in Petrograd as the commander of a combat detachment. Ryvkin also participated in the Russian Civil War as an ordinary soldier. At the 1st Congress of the Komsomol, he was elected as a member of the Central Committee of the Komsomol, then became the First Chairman of the Central Committee, and then served as the First Secretary of the Central Committee of the Komsomol which made him the de facto leader of the Komsomol. In 1922, he worked at the People's Commissariat for Education.

Ryvkin was a delegate to the first four Congresses of the Komsomol, as well as to the Second Congress of the Young Communist International. At the Fifth Congress of the Komsomol, Ryvkin was elected as an honorary member of the Komsomol.

From 1924 to 1928, Ryvkin was to Nizhny Novgorod Oblast for party work. He held a number of posts there including secretary of the local city committee of the Communist Party of the Soviet Union, head of the Propaganda Department of the Vyksa City Committee, Executive Secretary of the Vyksa City Committee, and Head of the Propaganda Department of the Nizhny Novgorod Provincial Committee of the Communist Party of the Soviet Union.

From 1927 to 1934, Oscar Ryvkin was a member of the Central Control Commission and the Rabkrin. After graduating from the Institute of Red Professors in 1934, Ryvkin served as the First Secretary of the Krasnodar City Committee of the Communist Party of the Soviet Union. However, on January 14, 1937, Oscar Ryvkin was arrested and nearly seven months later was executed by a firing squad on August 7, 1937. He was posthumously rehabilitated by the Military Collegium of the Supreme Court of the USSR in March 1956.

Honorary Members of the Komsomol. Ryvkin is sitting on right side of the front row.

== Legacy ==
A sculpture dedicated to Oscar Ryvkin along with a memorial plaque can be found in Krasnodar.
