= Aleksandr Kosarev (politician) =

Soviet politician (1903–1939)

- Александр Косарев
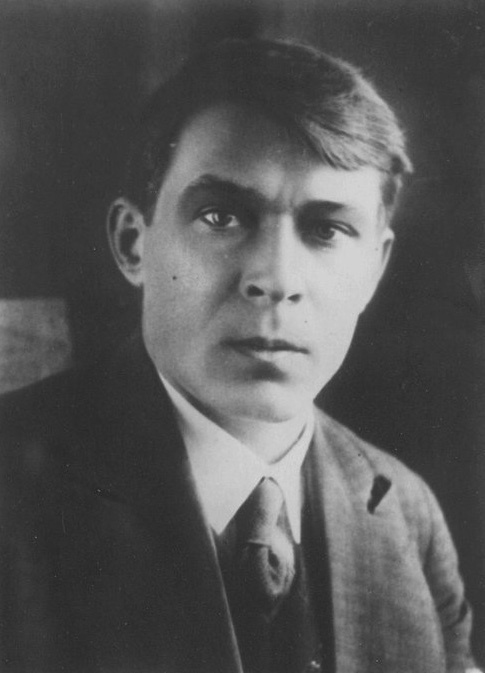
- Kosarev in 1934

First Secretary of the Central Committee of the Komsomol
- In office 24 March 1929 – 23 November 1938
- Preceded by: Alexander Milchakov
- Succeeded by: Nikolai Mikhailov

Full member of the 17th Orgburo
- In office 10 February 1934 – 23 November 1938

Candidate member of the 16th Orgburo
- In office 13 July 1930 – 10 February 1934

Personal details
- Born: 1 November 1903; Moscow, Russian Empire
- Died: 23 February 1939 (aged 35); Moscow, RSFSR, Soviet Union
- Political party: VKP (b) (1919–1938)
- Awards: Order of Lenin

Aleksandr Vasilyevich Kosarev (Russian: Александр Васильевич Косарев; 1 November 1903 – 23 February 1939) was a Soviet politician and Communist Party official who was active in the youth movement. He served as the 7th First Secretary of the Central Committee of the Komsomol. He played a critical role in promoting the idea of Nikolai Starostin in establishment of professional football competitions in front of the Soviet Council on Physical Culture.

== Early career ==
Born into a working-class family in Moscow, Kosarev lost his father during childhood. When he was nine years old, his widowed mother could not afford to keep him in school. He worked in a knitwear factory from 1914. After the February Revolution, he joined the 'Union of Working Class Youth', organised by the Bolsheviks, and joined the ranks of the Komsomol when it was founded in 1918, and the Russian Communist Party (Bolsheviks) in 1919.

There are contradictory accounts about Kosarev's record during the Russian Civil War. He is reported to have joined the Red Army as a volunteer, or alternatively to have avoided serving by pleading ill health.

After the civil war, he achieved rapid promotion through Komsomol, firstly in Moscow, where he was first secretary of the Bauman district committee, January 1922 – July 1924, then as first secretary of the Penza provincial committee in 1924–26. In January 1926, when a majority of Komsomol members in Leningrad supported Grigory Zinoviev against Joseph Stalin in the latest rift in the communist party leadership, Kosarev was one of the officials sent to purge the provincial Komsomol and impose a new leadership loyal to Stalin. In March 1926, one of Zinoviev's supporters, Grigory Yevdokimov complained to the Central Committee that 'hundreds' of members of the Leningrad Komsomol had lost their jobs during the purge.

Kosarev served as secretary of a district committee in Leningrad until April, when he was transferred to Moscow as head of a department. In March 1927, he was appointed a secretary of Komsomol, and later in 1927 was elected to the Central Control Commission of the Communist Party of the Soviet Union.

In 1928, there was another rift in the communist party leadership, between Stalin and Nikolai Bukharin, who opposed Stalin's decision to drive the peasants onto collective farms. Bukharin had been the main contact between the party and Komsomol. In February 1929, Stalin launched purge of Komsomol's leaders, which resulted in the removal all but 22 of the 120 members of Komsomol's Central Committee, including almost the entire top tier of the leadership, except for Kosarev. On 24 March 1929 he was elected him First Secretary of the Central Committee of the Komsomol.

== Head of the Komsomol ==
Under Kosarev's direction, all members of Komsomol were required to renounce religion – and their parents, if their parents were religious – and were encouraged to vandalise churches and church property. Thousands were sent to the villages to help force the peasants to join collective farms.

In February 1934, he was elected a member of the Central Committee of the Communist Party of the Soviet Union. At 31, he is likely to have been its youngest member. He was also promoted to the Orgburo.

In 1935 Kosarev founded the Spartak Sports Union, with the footballer Nikolai Starostin, and others. He was also the initiator of the Soviet Top League. Starostin's younger brother Andrei, also a footballer, paid a posthumous tribute to Kosarev:

What an extraordinarily attractive person he was! In the struggle for a just life and people's truth, Kosarev, a boy from a poor working-class family in the Moscow suburbs, went a long and difficult way from an auxiliary worker at a pre-revolutionary factory to the recognized leader of the youth.

Starostin also described Kosarev as having dressed in public in a civilian suit, white tie, and shirt. Kosarev is credited with playing a leading part in getting Soviet officials to abandon the military uniforms that were standard in the 1920s. Reputedly he "one day declared a new slogan: 'Work productively, rest culturally.' After that, he always wore European clothes."

== Great Purge ==
Kosarev was a willing participant in Stalin's Great Purge, before he was himself caught up in it. After the assassination of Sergei Kirov, he was appointed to the three-member commission headed by Nikolai Yezhov who supervised the investigation and, against resistance from the head of the NKVD, Genrikh Yagoda, attributed political responsibility for the murder to Zinoviev and other ex-oppositionists. Kosarev was personally close to Yezhov's wife, Yevgenia Gladun: he may even have been one of her lovers.

As a self-styled "diligent student of the great Stalin," Kosarev oversaw a purge in which 141,337 people were expelled from the Komsomol for "hostile activity" in 1936–1938, 72,000 of them in nine months of 1937. Nevertheless, in August 1937, the Komsomol leadership received a formal rebuke from the Central Committee for having “ignored the instructions of the party to increase Bolshevik vigilance, showed intolerable political carelessness and overlooked the special methods of subversive work of the enemies of the people in the Komsomol. They even connived at this."

During the crucial Central Committee plenum in February 1937, which discussed the fate of Lenin's old comrades Bukharin and Alexei Rykov, Kosarev declared: "People who have lifted their hands against Comrade Stalin cannot be our comrades. They are enemies, and we must deal with them as we would with any enemy." He then voted in favour of having both men arrested and shot.

== Arrest and execution ==
In September 1937, the Komsomol had dispatched an instructor named Olga Mishkova to the Chuvash ASSR, where she denounced almost the entire local Komsomol leadership as enemies of the people. When Kosarev ignored her, she complained to Stalin. Her letter was discussed at an extraordinary four-day plenum of Komsomol's Central Committee attended by Stalin and other members of the Politburo, at which Kosarev and his principal allies, Valentina Pikina and Serafim Bogachev were removed from office.

Kosarev told the plenum: “I do not consider myself an enemy and will not consider myself... No one can prove that I am an enemy of the people... Personally, I feel absolutely calm, because my conscience is clear. I have never betrayed either the party or the Soviet people, and I will not."

Stalin is said to have approached Kosarev at a banquet, clinked glasses with him, and whispered: "Traitor! I'll kill you." – but he later implied that the subsequent decision to arrest Kosarev was not made by him, but by Lavrentiy Beria, who took over control of the NKVD from Yezhov in August 1938.

Kosarev's widow agreed. She claimed that Beria had a grudge against her husband because he once toasted "To the real Bolshevik leadership in Transcaucasia, which is not there yet" at a dinner at which Mir Jafar Baghirov, for many years an ally of Beria, was a guest. He, presumably, informed on Kosarev to Beria, who repeated the remark back to Kosarev, asking why he thought he, Beria, was not fit to run Transcaucasia.

Kosarev was arrested by Beria in person on 28 November 1938. He was interrogated by the infamous torturer Boris Rodos, who was unable to force a confession out of him. While in prison, he wrote to Stalin : “The Komsomol workers arrested in my 'case' are not guilty of anything ... The destruction of cadres brought up by the Soviet power is madness ... I demand that an honest, authoritative commission be created that will check all materials without bias and make objective conclusions ”. He was sentenced to death by the Military Collegium of the Supreme Court of the USSR. He was shot on 23 February 1939 in the Lefortovo prison. The body was cremated at the Donskoy cemetery, the ashes were buried in a common grave.

Kosarev was posthumously rehabilitated on 24 August 1954, and on 14 March 1989 his membership in the CPSU was confirmed.

== Family ==
Kosarev's wife, Maria, was the daughter of the Georgian Old Bolshevik, Viktor Naneishvili (1878–1940), who was First Secretary of the Communist Party of the Kyrgyz Republic from 1924 until it was renamed Kazakhstan in 1925. He was arrested during the Great Purge. Maria, too, was arrested at the same time as her husband, and exiled to Norilsk.

After her release, she went to live with her mother in Rustavi, in Georgia. She was soon rearrested and sent back to Norilsk. Their daughter Yelena was brought up by grandparents, but was arrested a few months after leaving school, sentenced to ten years' exile, and sent to join her mother in Norilsk. Mother and daughter were rehabilitated in 1954.

Kosarev had an affair with the film star, and Komsomol member, Valentina Serova, who was 20 at the time of his arrest, and was fortunate to escape being implicated.
