= Nikolai Chaplin =

Soviet politician (1902–1938)

- Николай Чаплин

First Secretary of the Central Committee of the Komsomol
- In office 18 July 1924 – 16 May 1928
- Preceded by: Office established
- Succeeded by: Alexander Milchakov

Chairman of the Central Bureau of Young Pioneers at the Central Committee of the Komsomol
- In office 21 June 1922 – 14 September 1922
- Preceded by: Office established
- Succeeded by: Oscar Tarkhanov

Personal details
- Born: Nikolai Pavlovich Chaplin; 19 December 1902 Rognedino, Roslavlsky Uyezd, Smolensk Governorate, Russian Empire
- Died: 23 September 1938 (aged 35)
- Party: CPSU (1919–1938)
- Spouse: Rosalia Lipskaya
- Children: Boris Chaplin
- Awards: Order of Lenin

Nikolai Pavlovich Chaplin (Russian: Николай Павлович Чаплин; 19 December 1902 – 23 September 1938) was a Soviet politician who served as the First Secretary of the Central Committee of the Komsomol from 1924 to 1928 as well as the first Chairman of the Young Pioneers movement in 1922.

== Early life and education ==
Chaplin was born in the town of Rognedino in the Russian Empire on December 19, 1902 in the family of a village priest. Chaplin was staunch supporter of the Bolsheviks, even before the October Revolution. In 1918, he established an organization of young communists at his school in Smolensk and became the Chairman of the Smolensk District City Committee of the Komsomol at the age of sixteen.

== Political career ==
After joining the Bolshevik Party in October 1919, he was appointed as the Secretary of Tyumen Provincial Committee of the Komsomol in the spring of 1920 He was elected as one of the delegates to the 3rd Congress of the Komsomol in October 1920. In September 1921, he served as the Head of the Political Education Department of the Yekaterinburg Provincial Committee of the Komsomol. He became a member of the Central Committee of the Komsomol at the 4th Congress and served as the Chairman of the Central Bureau of the Young Pioneers at the Central Committee of the Komsomol in 1922. Chaplin was elected as the First Secretary of the Central Committee of the Komsomol during the April Plenum of the Central Committee of the Komsomol; he served in the position until 1928. He was a candidate member of the Central Committee of the Communist Party of the Soviet Union from 1924 to 1934. He was also a candidate member of the Organizing Bureau of the Central Committee of the Communist Party of the Soviet Union from 1924 to 1930.

After ending his term as the First Secretary, he secretly visited Germany, England, Belgium, and Turkey under disguise. He furthered studied Marxism-Leninism after being appointed as the Secretary of the Transcaucasian Region Committee of the Communist Party of the Soviet Union. He became the Head of the Political Department of the Kirov Railway Administration in 1933. He was awarded the Order of Lenin in 1936 for "work in transport". He was appointed as the Head of South Eastern Railway in 1937, but was soon arrested.

== Death ==
Chaplin became the victim of the Great Purge and was shot to death on September 23, 1938 in Moscow.

Chaplin was rehabilitated by the military collegium of the Supreme Court of the USSR on July 9, 1955 and on August 9, posthumously reinstated in the party by the Party Control Committee under the Central Committee of the CPSU.

== Personal life ==
Chaplin was married to Rosalia Lipskaya with whom he had one child.

== Awards ==
- (Soviet Union) Order of Lenin (awarded in 1936)

== See also ==
- Komsomol
- Communist Party of the Soviet Union
