= Nikolai Mikhailov (politician) =

Soviet politician and diplomat (1906–1982)

- Николай Михайлов
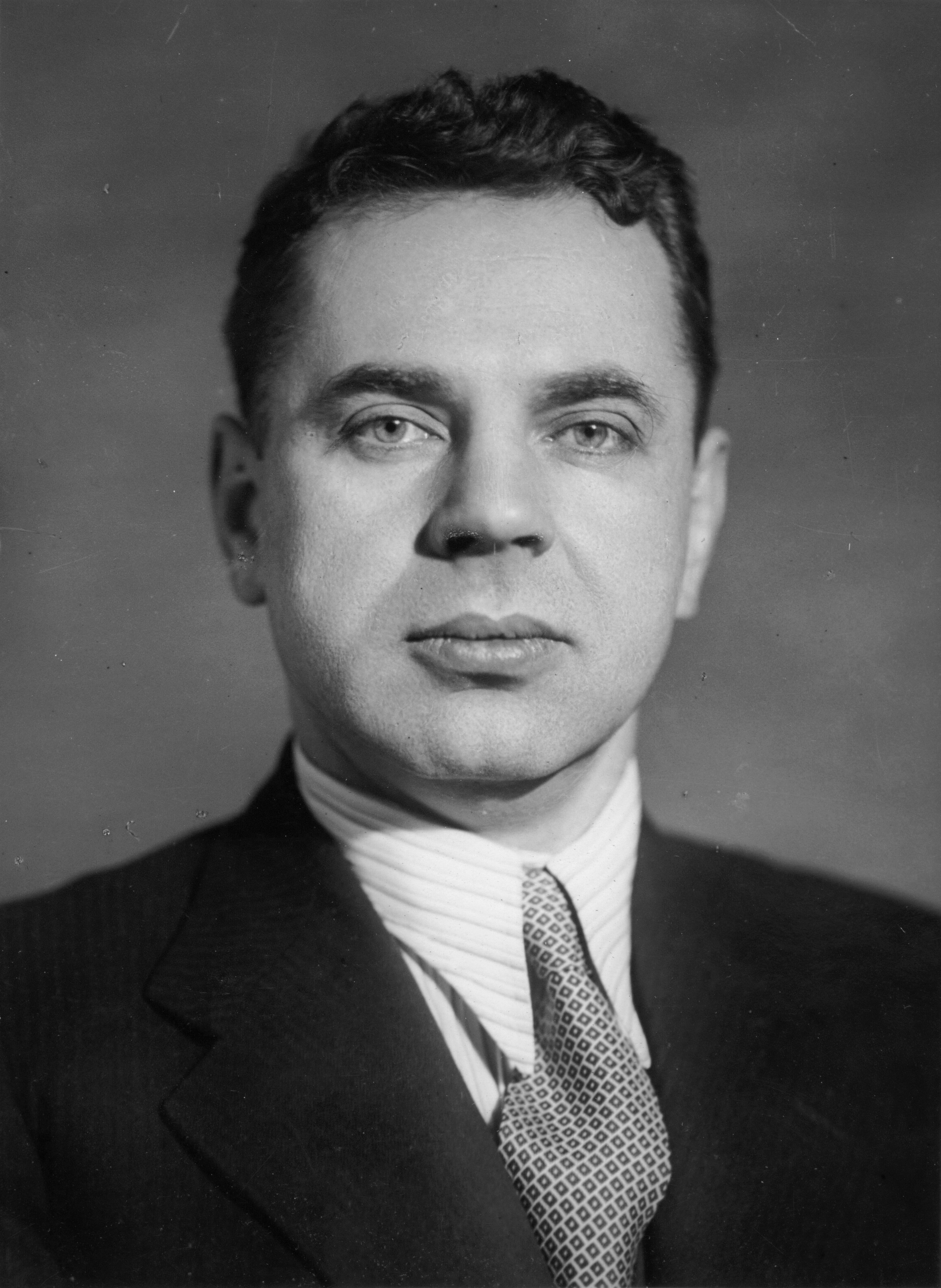
- Mikhailov c. 1952

Minister of Culture
- In office 21 March 1955 – 4 May 1960
- Premier: Nikita Khrushchev
- Preceded by: Georgy Aleksandrov
- Succeeded by: Yekaterina Furtseva

First Secretary of the Central Committee of the Komsomol
- In office 23 November 1938 – 30 October 1952
- Preceded by: Aleksandr Kosarev
- Succeeded by: Alexander Shelepin

Full member of the 19th Presidium of the Communist Party of the Soviet Union
- In office 16 October 1952 – 6 March 1953

Member of the 19th Secretariat of the Communist Party of the Soviet Union
- In office 14 October 1952 – 14 March 1953

Personal details
- Born: 10 October 1906 Moscow, Russian Empire
- Died: 25 May 1982 (aged 75) Moscow, Russian SFSR, Soviet Union
- Party: Communist Party of the Soviet Union (1930–1970)
- Profession: Politician, diplomat, journalist
- Awards: Three; Order of the Great Patriotic War

Nikolai Aleksandrovich Mikhailov (10 October 1906 – 25 May 1982) was a Soviet politician, journalist, and diplomat who served as First Secretary of the Komsomol from 1938 to 1952 and as Minister of Culture from 1955 to 1960.

== Biography ==
Mikhailov was born into the family of a shoemaker. After the October Revolution, he worked for his father and then became a laborer at the Hammer and Sickle plant. He joined the Red Army in 1930 and became a member of the All-Union Communist Party (b) in the same year. He took three courses in journalism at the Moscow State University.

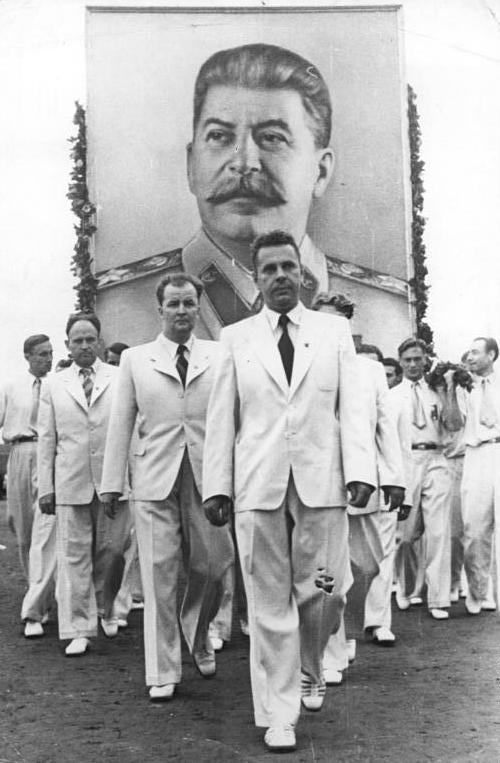
Nikolai Mikhailov representing the Komsomol of the Soviet Union In Budapest during the 2nd World Festival of Youth and Students. 1949

In 1933 he worked at the press department of the Moscow Committee of the VKP (b) and was later sent to work as an employee in the editorial board of the newspaper Pravda. In 1937 he was appointed executive editor of the newspaper Komsomolskaya Pravda. He used this position to run campaigns against arrested "right-wing Trotskyists, conspirators, wreckers", etc., as well as to glorify Joseph Stalin.

After the Great Purge, Mikhailov was appointed First Secretary of the Central Committee of the Komsomol in 1939 and held the position until 1952; at the age of 46, he was still leader of the country's youth (he was succeeded in 1952 by the much younger Alexander Shelepin). Under his leadership, legends about "pioneer heroes" and "Komsomol heroes" were created and the organization promoted self-sacrifice and loyalty to Stalin and the Communist Party.

Mikhailov was rapidly promoted during the last months of Stalin's life. In October 1952 to March 1953 he was appointed a Secretary, head of the party's agitation and propaganda department, and a member of its 25-man Presidium of the CPSU. This was the time of the antisemitic purges following the Doctors' plot, a fabricated conspiracy in which prominent doctors were accused of plotting against Stalin. Other victims included the actor Solomon Mikhoels, the Old Bolshevik Solomon Lozovsky, Polina Zhemchuzhina, and many more. Mikhailov was evidently chosen to play a major role in the persecution of the Jews. He was selected in January 1952 to be the main speaker at the ceremony marking the anniversary of the death of Lenin, and devoted almost the entire speech to the "Doctors' Plot". According to Stalin's daughter, Svetlana Alliluyeva:

The wife of N.A.Mikhailov told me, 'If I had my way, I'd expel all Jews from Moscow!' Her husband was obviously of the same mind. It was the official temper of the times, and its origin, as I could easily guess, came from the very top.

On 7 March 1953, shortly after Stalin's death, Mikhailov replaced Nikita Khrushchev as first secretary of the Moscow provincial party organisation. He retained his post as a secretary of the Central Committee, but only for a week. On 14 March, Khrushchev took over from Georgi Malenkov as First Secretary, and Mikhailov was removed from the secretariat. This would suggest that he was an ally of Malenkov in the power struggles in the Kremlin. He was a member of the Special Judicial Hearings of the Supreme Court of the Soviet Union in December 1953, who sentenced Lavrentiy Beria and a number of people close to him to capital punishment.

Mikhailov was removed from his post as head of the Moscow party organisation on 31 March 1954, and appointed Ambassador of the Soviet Union to the Polish People's Republic. From 1955 to 1960 he was USSR Minister of Culture of the USSR. Again at diplomatic work, he was the Soviet ambassador to Indonesia from 1960 to 1965.

From 1965 to 1970 he was the chairman of the Press Committee under the Council of Ministers of the Soviet Union.

Mikhailov retired in Moscow in 1970. He died on May 25, 1982, and was buried at the Troyekurovskoye Cemetery.
