= Alexander Milchakov =

Soviet politician (1903–1973)

- Александр Мильчаков

First Secretary of the Central Committee of the Komsomol
- In office 17 May 1928 – 24 March 1929
- Preceded by: Nikolai Chaplin
- Succeeded by: Aleksandr Kosarev

First Secretary of the Komsomol of Ukraine
- In office 1927–1928
- Preceded by: Semyon Vysochinenko
- Succeeded by: Ivan Korsunov

Personal details
- Born: Alexander Ivanovich Milchakov; 11 October 1903 Vyatka, Russian Empire
- Died: 17 July 1973 (aged 69) Moscow, Soviet Union
- Citizenship: Soviet Union; Russian Empire (previously)
- Party: CPSU (1919–1938, 1954–1973)
- Awards: Order of Lenin Order of the Red Banner of Labour

Alexander Ivanovich Milchakov (Russian: Александр Иванович Мильчаков; 11 October 1903 – 17 July 1973) was a Soviet politician and political activist who was known for serving as the First Secretary of the Central Committee of the Komsomol from 1928 to 1929, between the age of 24 and 26.

== Early life and education ==
Milchakov was born in 1903, in the village of Vyatka (now Kirov) in the Russian Empire. His father was a railroad worker. At the age of fifteen, Alexander Milchakov joined the Socialist Union of Working Youth and became a Deputy of the Council of Workers, Soldiers, and Peasants.

== Political career ==
He joined the Russian Communist Party (Bolsheviks) in 1919.

From 1919 to 1921, Milchakov held minor positions within the Komsomol in Perm and Verkhneuralsk. From 1921 to 1925, he was a member of the Central Committee of the Komsomol. In 1922, he was the youngest delegate to the First All-Union Congress of Soviets. In 1925, he also became involved with the Young Communist International and became a member of the Presidium of the Executive Committee of the Young Communist International. He also became a member of the Central Control Commission of the Communist Party of the Soviet Union from 1925 to 1934. He was also a candidate member of the Central Executive Committee of the Soviet Union. From 1927 to 1928, he served as the First Secretary of the Komsomol of Ukraine and from 1928 to 1929, he served as the First Secretary of the Central Committee of the Komsomol.

In 1931, he briefly became a head of a department within the Central Committee of the Communist Party of the Soviet Union. Milchakov was a delegate to the 12-17th Congresses of the Communist Party of the Soviet Union, a delegate to the 2-9th Congressess of the Komsomol, a delegate to the 5th World Congress of the Communist International, and a delegate to the 3-5th Congresses of the Young Communist International.

Milchakov was repressed during the Great Purge in 1938 and sentenced to 16 years of forced labor. He was initially sent to the Norilsk Forced Labor Camp, better known as the Norillag, but was later sent to the Magadan Forced Labor Camp (Maglag). He was rehabilitated in 1954 and was readmitted into the Communist Party of the Soviet Union during the Khrushchev Thaw.

== Death ==
Milchakov died at the age of 69 in Moscow. He is buried at the Novodevichy Cemetery located in Moscow. There are streets in Perm and Rostov-on-Don named after Alexander Milchakov. There are streets in Perm and Rostov-on-Don named after Alexander Milchakov.

== Awards ==
- (Soviet Union) Order of Lenin
- (Soviet Union) Order of the Red Banner of Labour

== See also ==
- Central Committee of the Komsomol
- Komsomol of Ukraine
