= Yefim Tsetlin =

Soviet politician and Communist Activist

- Ефим Цетлин

First Secretary of the Central Committee of the Komsomol
- In office 4 November 1918 – 17 July 1919
- Preceded by: Office established
- Succeeded by: Oscar Ryvkin

Personal details
- Born: Yefim Victorovich Tsetlin; 1898 Mogilev, Mogilev Governorate, Russian Empire
- Died: 22 September 1937 (aged 38–39) Ivanovo, RSFSR, Soviet Union
- Citizenship: Soviet Union
- Party: CPSU (1918–1933, 1934–1937)
- Occupation: Politician

Yefim Victorovich Tsetlin (Russian: Ефим Викторович Цетлин; 1898 – 22 September 1937) was a Soviet politician and an activist of the youth communist movement in the Soviet Union.

== Early life and education ==
Tsetlin was born into a Jewish family in the city of Mogilev in the Russian Empire (modern day Belarus). He studied at the Moscow Technical University from 1917 to 1918. During his time as a student, he participated in the October Revolution in Petrograd. From November 1917 to April 1918 he was the Chairman of the District Committee of the Workers' Youth Union in Moscow.

== Political career ==
Tsetlin became a member of the Bolshevik Party in 1918. He immediately became the First Secretary of the Central Committee of the Komsomol on 4 November 1918. In 1919, he became deeply involved with the Young Communist International. He became the Secretary of the Moscow Committee of the Komsomol in 1920. In 1922, Tsetlin became a member of the Executive Committee of the Young Communist International and in the same year, he was sent to Germany for Bolshevik agitation. He worked in various positions soon after, including becoming a member of the editorial board of Pravda, member of the Executive Committee of the Comintern, and other minor work regarding the party in Leningrad. From 1929 to 1932, Tsetlin was an employee of the Supreme Soviet of the National Economy and later from 1932 to 1933, he served as the Deputy Head of the Scientific and Research Sector of the People's Commissariat of Heavy Industry.

Tsetlin was arrested on 13 February 1933 due to his potential involvement in the Slepkov Case. He was expelled from the Communist Party of the Soviet Union on 20 February 1933. He was released on 4 May 1933 and was sent to Sverdlovsk soon after. His party membership was restored on 10 July 1934. From 1934 to 1937 he worked as the manager of the Technical Service Office of the Ural Heavy Machinery Factory in Sverdlovsk. He was arrested again on 16 April 1937 during the Great Purge. He was initially sentenced to imprisonment and forfeiture of rights but was sentenced to execution by the Ivanovo Oblast NKVD troika. On 22 September 1937 Tsetlin was executed by a firing squad. He was posthumously rehabilitated on 27 August 1957 by the Military Collegium of the Supreme Court of the USSR.
