= Rognedino =

Rognedino Рогнедино
- Town
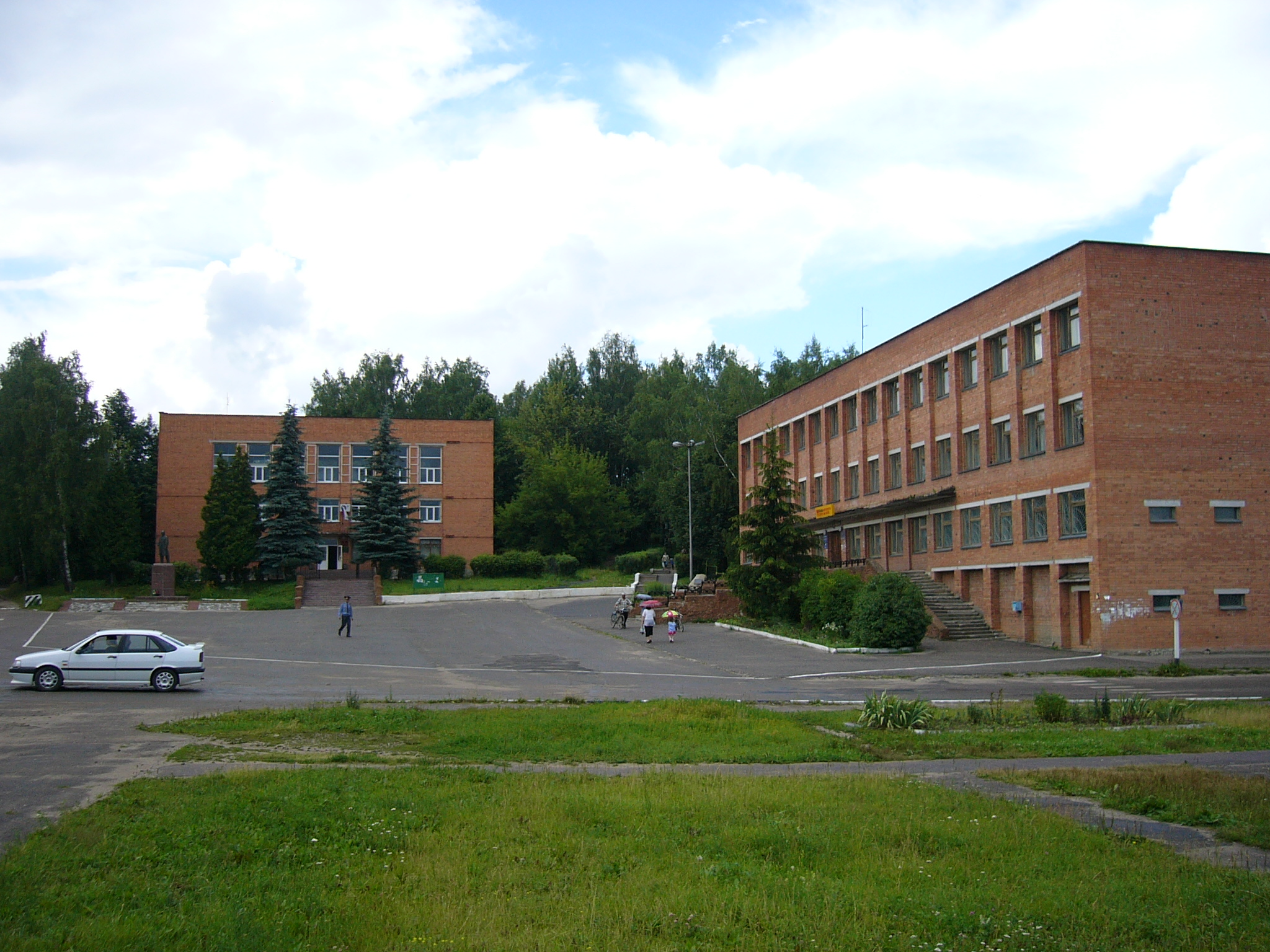
- Central square in the town
- Interactive map of Rognedino
- Location of Rognedino Rognedino (Bryansk Oblast)
- Coordinates: 53°48′00″N 33°33′37″E
- Country: Russia
- Federal subject: Bryansk Oblast
- First mentioned: 1168
- Town status since: 1986

Population (2010 Census)
  - Total: 3,158
  - Estimate (2025): 2,656 (−15.9%)

Administrative status
  - Capital of: Town of oblast significance of Rognedino, Rognedinsky District

Municipal status
  - Municipal district: Rognedinsky Municipal District
  - Urban settlement: Rognedinsky Urban Settlement
  - Capital of: Rognedinsky Municipal District, Rognedinsky Urban Settlement
- Time zone: UTC+3 (MSK)
- Postal code: 242770
- Dialing code: +7 48331
- OKTMO ID: 15646151051

Rognedino (Russian: Рогне́дино) is an urban-type settlement and the administrative center Rognedinsky District Bryansk Oblast of Russia. Population: 2,775 (2021 census); 3,158 (2010 census); 3,354 (2002 census); 3,452 (1989 Soviet census).

Located 96 km north-west of Bryansk, the administrative center of the region, 15km north of Dubrovka railway station.

== History ==
First mentioned in 1168, the name given by the name of Princess Rogneda sisters Smolensk (later - Kiev) Prince Rostislav Mstislavovitch.

In the village there is flax factory. Peat extraction is carried out in the area.
