= List of ambassadors of Russia to Mongolia =

Ambassador of the Russian Federation to Mongolia
- Emblem of the Russian Foreign Ministry
- Incumbent; Aleksey Yevsikov since 18 January 2023
- Ministry of Foreign Affairs; Embassy of Russia in Ulaanbaatar
- Style: His Excellency
- Reports to: Minister of Foreign Affairs
- Seat: Ulaanbaatar
- Appointer: President of Russia
- Term length: At the pleasure of the president
- Website: Embassy of Russia in Mongolia

The ambassador extraordinary and plenipotentiary of Russia to Mongolia is the official representative of the president and the government of the Russian Federation to the president and the government of Mongolia.

The ambassador and his staff work at large in the Embassy of Russia in Ulaanbaatar. There are consulates-general in Darkhan and Erdenet. The post of Russian ambassador to Mongolia is currently held by Aleksey Yevsikov, incumbent since 18 January 2023.

== History of diplomatic relations ==
Diplomatic relations between the Russian Soviet Federative Socialist Republic and Mongolia were first formalized on 5 November 1921. The first diplomatic representative, Nikolai Lyubarsky, was appointed on 7 July 1922. The Russian Soviet Federative Socialist Republic became one of the constituent republics in the formation of the Soviet Union in late 1922, and representation continued throughout the existence of the Soviet Union. With the dissolution of the Soviet Union in 1991, the incumbent Soviet ambassador, Vasily Sitnikov, continued as representative of Russia until 1992.

== List of representatives (1928–present) ==
=== Russian Soviet Federative Socialist Republic to Mongolia (1922) ===
Name	Title	Appointment	Termination	Notes
Nikolai Lyubarsky	Diplomatic representative	7 July 1922	December 1922	

=== Soviet Union to Mongolia (1922-1991) ===
Name	Title	Appointment	Termination	Notes
Nikolai Lyubarsky	Diplomatic representative	December 1922	July 1923	
Aleksey Vasilyev	Diplomatic representative	1 August 1923	29 August 1925	Credentials presented on 6 January 1924
Pyotr Nikiforov	Diplomatic representative	29 August 1925	14 September 1927	Credentials presented on 19 September 1925
Andrey Okhtin	Diplomatic representative	14 September 1927	2 September 1933	Credentials presented on 28 September 1927
Sergey Chutskayev	Diplomatic representative	2 September 1933	9 February 1935	Credentials presented on 8 September 1933
Vladimir Tairov	Diplomatic representative	9 February 1935	19 August 1937	Credentials presented on 8 March 1935
Sergey Mironov	Diplomatic representative	19 August 1937	3 May 1938	Credentials presented on 26 August 1937
Mikhail Golubchuk	Diplomatic representative	3 May 1938	13 January 1939	Credentials presented on 14 May 1938
Ivan Ivanov	Diplomatic representative until 9 May 1941; Envoy after 9 May 1941	19 September 1939	9 October 1947	Credentials presented on 21 October 1939
Nikolai Vazhnov	Envoy	9 October 1947	27 September 1948	Credentials presented on 5 September 1947
Yury Prikhodov	Envoy until 28 March 1950; Ambassador after 28 March 1950	27 September 1948	14 November 1951	Credentials presented on 22 October 1948
Georgy Ivannikov	Ambassador	14 November 1951	6 November 1953	Credentials presented on 24 January 1952
Vasily Pisarev	Ambassador	6 November 1953	31 August 1957	Credentials presented on 30 January 1954
Vyacheslav Molotov	Ambassador	31 August 1957	3 July 1960	Credentials presented on 7 September 1957
Aleksey Khvorostukhin	Ambassador	3 July 1960	14 February 1962	Credentials presented on 25 January 1961
Konstantin Rusakov	Ambassador	14 February 1962	21 November 1963	Credentials presented on 23 January 1962
Leonid Solovyov	Ambassador	21 November 1963	15 February 1968	Credentials presented on 27 December 1963
Semyon Shchetinin	Ambassador	15 February 1968	10 July 1973	Credentials presented on 25 April 1968
Aleksandr Smirnov	Ambassador	10 July 1973	18 February 1983	Credentials presented on 26 September 1973
Sergei Pavlov	Ambassador	18 February 1983	4 April 1985	Credentials presented on 29 March 1983
Konstantin Fomichenko	Ambassador	4 April 1985	25 March 1988	
Vasily Sitnikov	Ambassador	25 March 1988	25 December 1991	

=== Russian Federation to Mongolia (1991-present) ===
Name	Title	Appointment	Termination	Notes
Vasily Sitnikov	Ambassador	25 December 1991	24 January 1992	
Sergey Razov	Ambassador	24 January 1992	31 May 1996	
Nikolai Pavlov	Ambassador	31 May 1996	18 October 1999	
Oleg Derkovsky	Ambassador	18 October 1999	24 March 2006	
Boris Govorin	Ambassador	24 March 2006	21 September 2009	Credentials presented on 27 April 2006
Viktor Samoylenko	Ambassador	21 September 2009	23 September 2013	
Iskander Azizov	Ambassador	23 September 2013	18 January 2023	Credentials presented on 15 November 2013
Aleksey Yevsikov	Ambassador	18 January 2023		Credentials presented on 17 April 2023
