= Vyacheslav Molotov =

Soviet politician and diplomat (1890–1986)

- Вячеслав Молотов
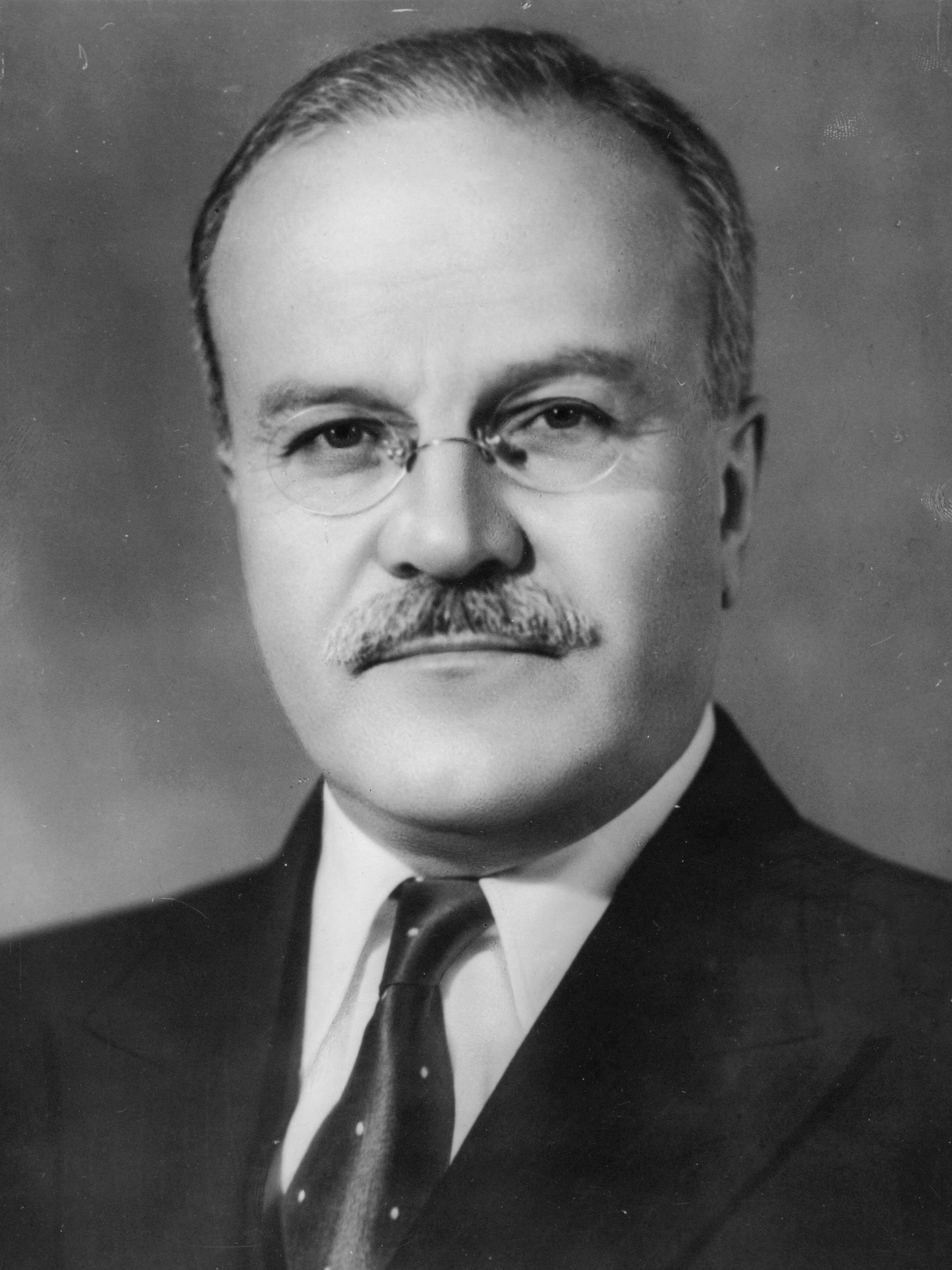
- Molotov in c. 1947

Premier of the Soviet Union
- In office 19 December 1930 – 6 May 1941
- President: Mikhail Kalinin (from 1938)
- First Deputies: Valerian Kuybyshev; Nikolai Voznesensky
- Preceded by: Alexei Rykov
- Succeeded by: Joseph Stalin

Minister of Foreign Affairs of the Soviet Union (Note: Before 1946, the title of the office was People's Commissar for Foreign Affairs.)
- In office 5 March 1953 – 1 June 1956
- Premier: Georgy Malenkov; Nikolai Bulganin
- Preceded by: Andrey Vyshinsky
- Succeeded by: Dmitri Shepilov
- In office 3 May 1939 – 4 March 1949
- Premier: Himself (1939–1941); Joseph Stalin (1941–1949)
- Preceded by: Maxim Litvinov
- Succeeded by: Andrey Vyshinsky

First Deputy Premier of the Soviet Union
- In office 16 August 1942 – 29 June 1957
- Premier: Joseph Stalin; Georgy Malenkov; Nikolai Bulganin

Responsible Secretary of the Russian Communist Party (Bolsheviks)
- In office 16 March 1921 – 3 April 1922
- Preceded by: Nikolay Krestinsky
- Succeeded by: Joseph Stalin (as General Secretary)

Personal details
- Born: Vyacheslav Mikhaylovich Skryabin; 9 March 1890 Kukarka, Russian Empire
- Died: 8 November 1986 (aged 96) Moscow, Soviet Union
- Resting place: Novodevichy Cemetery
- Party: RSDLP (1906–1912); CPSU (1912–1961, 1984–1986)
- Spouse: Polina Zhemchuzhina (m. 1920; died 1970)
- Children: 2
- Relatives: Vyacheslav Nikonov (grandson)
- Awards: Hero of Socialist Labour
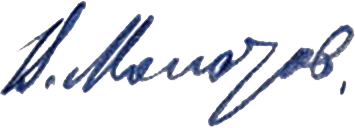
- Signature
- Central institution membership: 1926–1957: Full member, 14th, 15th, 16th, 17th, 18th Politburo & 19th, 20th Presidium of CPSU; 1921–1926: Candidate member, 10th, 11th, 12th, 13th Politburo of CPSU; 1921–1930: Full member, 10th, 11th, 12th, 13th, 14th, 15th, 16th Secretariat of AUCP(b); 1921–1930: Full member, 10th, 11th, 12th, 13th, 14th, 15th, 16th Orgburo of CPSU; Other offices held: 1920–1921: First Secretary of the Communist Party of Ukraine; 1929–1935: General Secretary of the Executive Committee of the Communist International; 1941–1944: Deputy Chairman, State Defense Committee of the Soviet Union; 1957–1960: Ambassador of the Soviet Union to Mongolia; 1960–1961: Representative of the Soviet Union to the International Atomic Energy Agency

Vyacheslav Mikhaylovich Molotov (Note: Russian: Вячеслав Михайлович Молотов, IPA: [vʲɪtɕɪˈslaf mʲɪˈxajləvʲɪtɕ ˈmolətəf]) (né Skryabin; (Note: Russian: Скрябин, IPA: [ˈskrʲæbʲɪn]) 9 March [O.S. 25 February] 1890 – 8 November 1986) was a Soviet politician, diplomat, and revolutionary. He was one of the most prominent figures in the Soviet government during the rule of his benefactor, Joseph Stalin. In addition to serving as Chairman of the Council of People's Commissars from 1930 to 1941, he held office as Minister of Foreign Affairs from 1939 to 1949 and again from 1953 to 1956. The Molotov cocktail was named for him.

An Old Bolshevik, Molotov joined the Russian Social Democratic Labour Party in 1906 and was arrested and internally exiled twice before the October Revolution of 1917. He briefly headed the party's Secretariat before supporting Stalin's rise to power in the 1920s, becoming one of his closest associates. Molotov was made a full member of the Politburo in 1926 and premier in 1930, overseeing Stalin's agricultural collectivisation (and resulting famine) and his Great Purge. Following his appointment as Foreign Minister in 1939, he signed the Molotov–Ribbentrop Pact with Nazi Germany, which led to their joint occupation of Poland and the ensuing annexation of the Baltic states. During World War II, he became deputy chairman of the State Defence Committee as well as Stalin's main negotiator with the Allies. Upon the war's end in 1945, he began to lose favour, losing his ministership in 1948 before being criticised by Stalin at the 19th Party Congress in 1952.

Molotov was reappointed foreign minister after Stalin's death in 1953. However, his staunch opposition to leader Nikita Khrushchev's de-Stalinization policy led him to join a failed coup against Khrushchev in 1957. Subsequently, he was dismissed from all his offices and sent to Mongolia as an ambassador. By 1961, he was expelled from the party altogether. He continued to defend Stalin's legacy until his own death in 1986.

== Early life and career ==
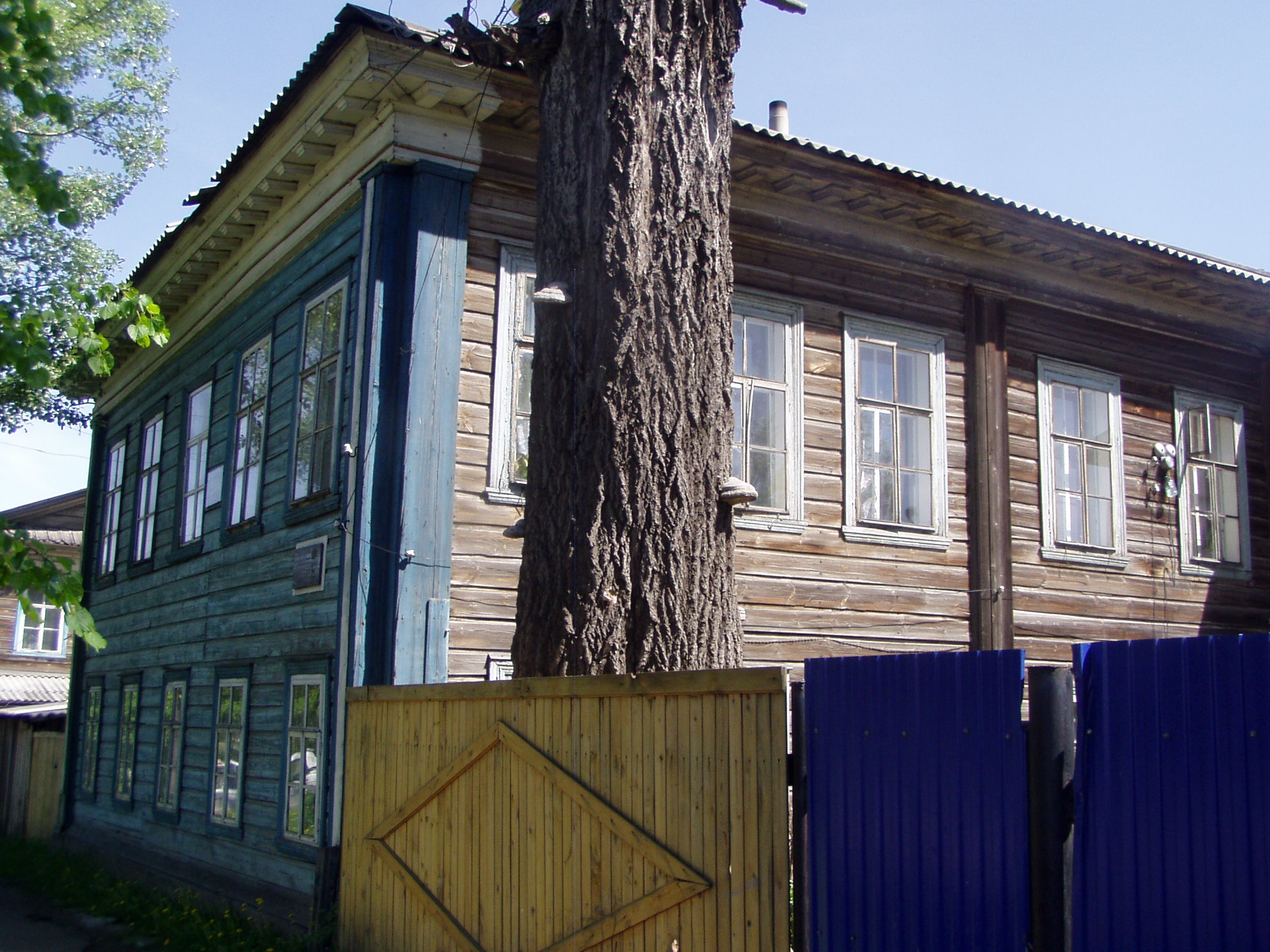
Molotov's birth house in Sovetsk, Kirov Oblast.

Molotov was born Vyacheslav Mikhailovich Skryabin in the village of Kukarka, Yaransk Uyezd, Vyatka Governorate (now Sovetsk, Kirov Oblast), the son of a merchant. Contrary to a commonly-repeated error, there is no evidence suggesting a genealogical connection to the composer Alexander Scriabin.

Throughout his teenage years, he was described as "shy" and "quiet" and always assisted his father with his business. He was educated at a secondary school in Kazan, where he became friends with fellow revolutionary Aleksandr Arosev. Molotov joined the Russian Social Democratic Labour Party (RSDLP) in 1906, and soon gravitated toward the organisation's radical Bolshevik faction, which was led by Vladimir Lenin.

Skryabin took the pseudonym "Molotov", derived from the Russian word molot (sledge hammer) since he believed that the name had an "industrial" and "proletarian" ring to it. He was arrested in 1909 and spent two years in exile in Vologda.

In 1911, he enrolled at St. Petersburg Polytechnic Institute. Molotov joined the editorial staff of a new underground Bolshevik newspaper, Pravda, and met Joseph Stalin for the first time in association with the project. That first association between the two future Soviet leaders proved to be brief, however, and failed to lead to an immediate close political association.

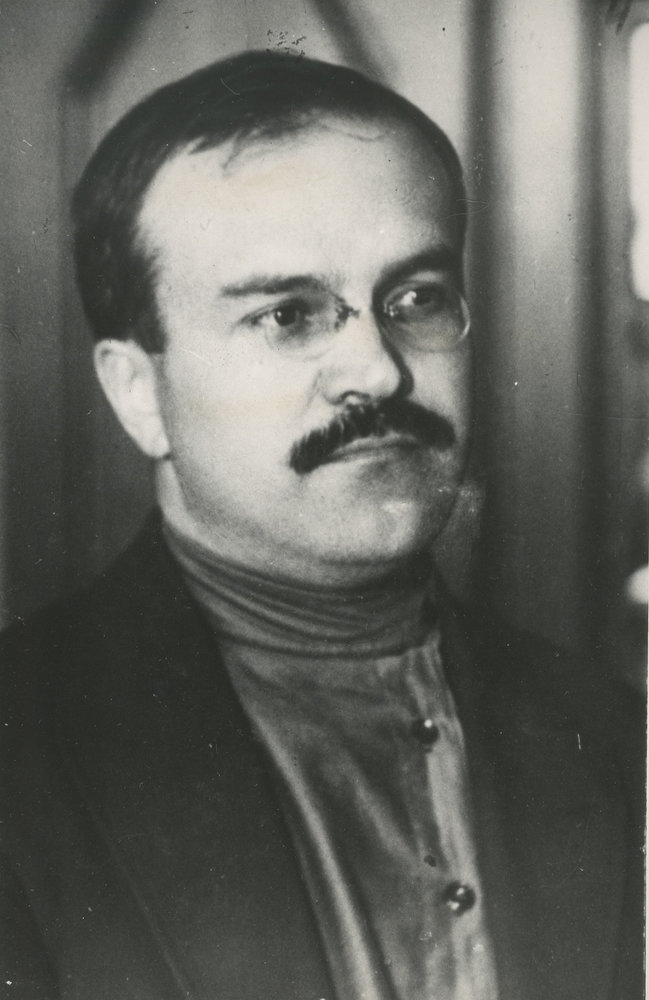
Molotov in 1917

Molotov worked as a so-called "professional revolutionary" for the next several years, wrote for the party press, and attempted to improve the organisation of the underground party. He moved from St. Petersburg to Moscow in 1914 at the outbreak of the First World War. It was in Moscow the following year that Molotov was again arrested for his party activity and was this time deported to Irkutsk, in eastern Siberia. In 1916, he escaped from his Siberian exile and returned to the capital city, which had been renamed Petrograd by the Tsarist regime – it being thought that the old name sounded too German.

Molotov became a member of the Bolshevik Party's committee in Petrograd in 1916. When the February Revolution occurred in 1917, he was one of the few Bolsheviks of any standing in the capital. Under his direction, Pravda took to the "left" to oppose the Provisional Government formed after the revolution. When Stalin returned to the capital, he reversed Molotov's line, but when Lenin arrived, he overruled Stalin. However, Molotov became a protégé of and a close adherent to Stalin, an alliance to which he owed his later prominence. Molotov became a member of the Military Revolutionary Committee, which planned the October Revolution and effectively brought the Bolsheviks to power.

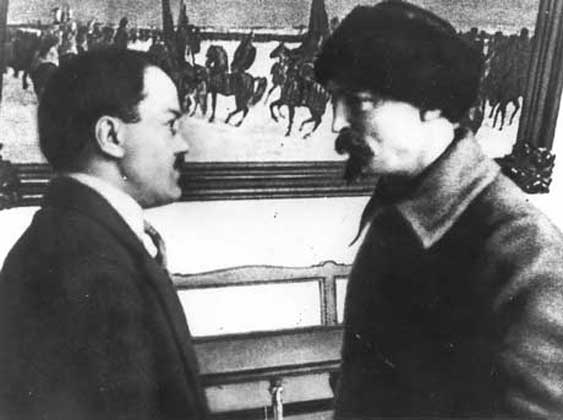
Molotov and the OGPU's first chief Felix Dzerzhinsky, 1924

In 1918, Molotov was sent to Ukraine to take part in the Russian Civil War, which had broken out. Since he was not a military man, he took no part in the fighting. In summer 1919, he was sent on a tour by steamboat of the Volga and Kama rivers, with Lenin's wife, Nadezhda Krupskaya to spread Bolshevik propaganda. On his return, he was appointed chairman of the Nizhny Novgorod provincial executive, where the local party passed a vote of censure against him, for his alleged fondness for intrigue. He was transferred to Donetsk, and in November 1920, he became secretary to the Central Committee of the Ukrainian Bolshevik Party and married the Soviet politician Polina Zhemchuzhina.

Lenin recalled Molotov to Moscow in 1921, elevated him to full membership of the Central Committee and Orgburo, and put him in charge of the party secretariat. Molotov was voted in as a non-voting member of the Politburo in 1921 and held the office of Responsible Secretary. Alexander Barmine, a minor communist official, visited Molotov in his office near the Kremlin while he was running the secretariat, and remembered him as having "a large and placid face, the face of an ordinary, uninspired, but rather soft and kindly bureaucrat, attentive and unassuming."

Molotov was criticised by Lenin and Leon Trotsky, with Lenin noting his "shameful bureaucratism" and "stupid behaviour". On the advice of Molotov and Nikolai Bukharin, the Central Committee decided to reduce Lenin's work hours. In 1922, Stalin became General Secretary of the Bolshevik Party with Molotov as the de facto Second Secretary. As a young follower, Molotov admired Stalin but did not refrain from criticising him. Under Stalin's patronage, Molotov became a full member of the Politburo in January 1926.

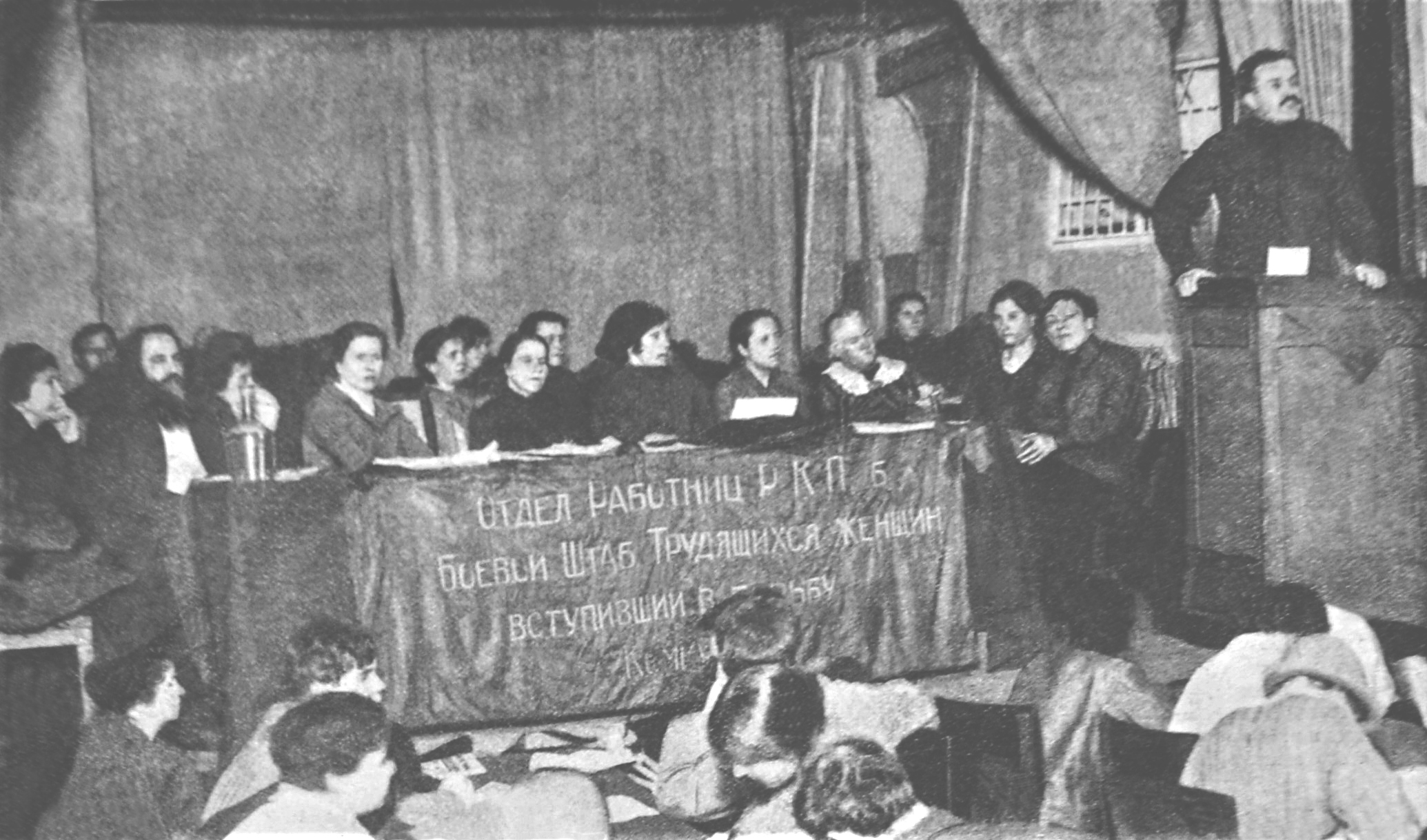
Molotov speaks at a meeting of peasant women, 1925

During the power struggles after Lenin's death in 1924, Molotov remained a loyal supporter of Stalin against his various rivals: first Leon Trotsky, later Lev Kamenev and Grigory Zinoviev, and finally Nikolai Bukharin. In January 1926, he led a special commission sent to Leningrad (St Petersburg) to end Zinoviev's control over the party machine in the province. In 1928, Molotov replaced Nikolai Uglanov as First Secretary of the Moscow Communist Party and held that position until 15 August 1929.

== Personality ==
Trotsky and his supporters underestimated Molotov, and the same went for many others. Trotsky called him "mediocrity personified," and Molotov himself pedantically corrected comrades referring to him as "Stone Arse" by saying that Lenin had actually dubbed him "Iron Arse." However, that outward dullness concealed a sharp mind and great administrative talent. He operated mainly behind the scenes and cultivated an image of a colourless bureaucrat.

Molotov was reported to be a vegetarian and teetotaller by the US journalist John Gunther in 1938. However, Milovan Djilas claimed that Molotov "drank more than Stalin" and did not note his vegetarianism although they had attended several banquets.

Molotov and his wife had two daughters: Sonia, adopted in 1929, and Svetlana, born in 1929.

== Soviet Premier ==
Addressing a Party conference in Moscow on 23 February 1929, Molotov emphasised the need to undertake "the most rapid possible growth of industry" both for economic reasons and because, he claimed, the Soviet Union was in permanent, imminent danger of attack. The argument over how fast to expand industry was behind the rift between Stalin and the right, led by Bukharin and Rykov, who feared that too rapid a pace would cause economic dislocation. With their defeat, Molotov emerged as the second most powerful figure in the Soviet Union. During the Central Committee plenum of 19 December 1930, Molotov succeeded Alexey Rykov as the Chairman of the Council of People's Commissars, the equivalent of a Western head of government.

In that post, Molotov oversaw the implementation of the First Five-Year Plan for rapid industrialisation. Despite the great human cost, the Soviet Union under Molotov's nominal premiership made large strides in the adoption and the widespread implementation of agrarian and industrial technology. Germany secretly purchased munitions that spurred a modern armaments industry in the USSR. Ultimately, that arms industry, along with aid from the UK and US, helped the Soviet Union prevail in the Second World War.

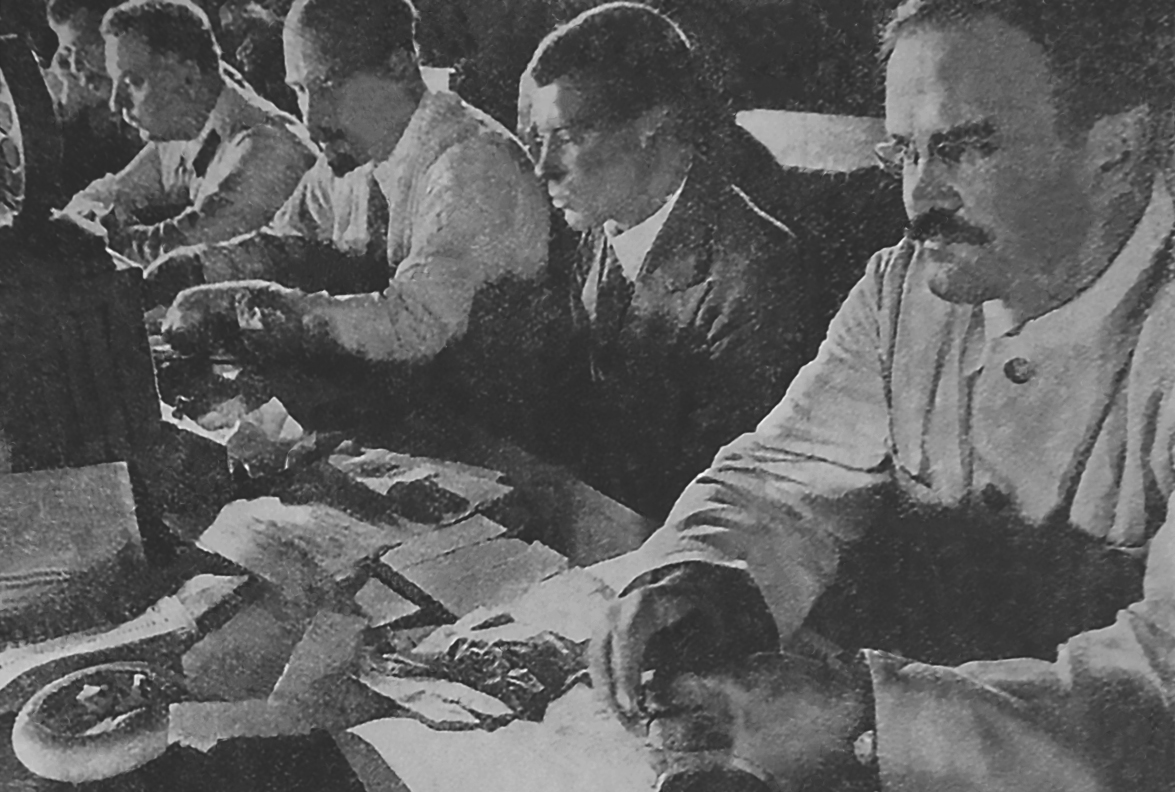
Klim Voroshilov, Lazar Kaganovich, Alexander Kosarev and Vyacheslav Molotov at the seventh Conference of the All-Union Leninist Young Communist League (Komsomol), July 1932.

=== Role in collectivisation ===
Molotov also oversaw agricultural collectivisation under Stalin's regime. He was the main speaker at the Central Committee plenum in 10–17 November 1929, which decided to collectivise farming in place of the thousands of small farms owned by peasants, a process that was bound to meet resistance. Molotov insisted that it begin the following year, and warned officials to "treat the kulak [land-owning peasant] as the most cunning and still undefeated enemy." In the four years that followed, millions of kulaks were forcibly moved onto special settlements to be used as slave labour. In 1931 alone almost two million were deported. In that year, Molotov told the Congress of Soviets "We have never refuted the fact that healthy prisoners capable of normal labour are used for road building and other public works. This is good for society; it is also good for the peasants themselves." The famine caused by the disruption of agricultural output and the emphasis on exporting grain to pay for industrialisation, and the harsh conditions of forced labour killed an estimated 11 million people.

Despite the famine, in September 1931, Molotov sent a secret telegram to communist leaders in the North Caucasus telling them the collection of grain for export was going "disgustingly slowly." In December, he travelled to Kharkov, then the capital of Ukraine, and, ignoring warnings from local communist leaders about a grain shortage, told them that their failure to meet their target for grain collection was due to their incompetence. He returned to Kharkov in July 1932, with Lazar Kaganovich, to tell the local communists that there would be no "concessions or vacillations" in the drive to meet targets for exporting grain. This was the first of several actions cited by a Ukrainian court in 2010, denouncing Molotov and Kaganovich guilty of genocide against the Ukrainian people. On 25 July, the same two men followed up the meeting with a secret telegram ordering the Ukrainian leadership to intensify grain collection.

=== Temporary rift with Stalin ===
Between the assassination of Sergei Kirov, the head of the Party organisation in Leningrad, in December 1934, and the start of the Great Purge, there was a significant but unpublicised rift between Stalin and Molotov. In 1936, Trotsky, in exile, noted that when lists of party leaders appeared in Soviet press reports, Molotov's name sometimes appeared as low as fourth in the list "and he was often deprived of his initials", and that when he was photographed receiving a delegation, he was never alone, but always flanked by his deputies, Janis Rudzutaks and Vlas Chubar. "In Soviet ritual all these are signs of paramount importance," Trotsky noted. Another startling piece of evidence was that the published transcript of the first Moscow Show Trial in August 1936, the defendants – who had been forced to confess to crimes of which they were innocent – said that they had conspired to kill Stalin and seven other leading Bolsheviks, but not Molotov. According to Alexander Orlov, an NKVD officer who defected to the west, Stalin personally crossed Molotov's name out of the original script.

In May 1936, Molotov went to the Black Sea on an extended holiday under careful NKVD supervision until the end of August, when Stalin apparently changed his mind and ordered Molotov's return.

Two explanations have been put forward for Molotov's temporary eclipse. On 19 March 1936 Molotov gave an interview with the editor of Le Temps concerning improved relations with Nazi Germany. Although Litvinov had made similar statements in 1934 and even visited Berlin that year, Germany had not then reoccupied the Rhineland. Derek Watson believed that it was Molotov's statement on foreign policy that offended Stalin. Molotov had made it clear that improved relations with Germany could develop only if its policy changed and stated that one of the best ways for Germany to improve relations was to rejoin the League of Nations. However, even that was insufficient, as Germany still had to give proof "of its respect for international obligations in keeping with the real interests of peace in Europe and peace generally." Robert Conquest and others believe that Molotov "dragged his feet" over Stalin's plans to purge the party and put Old Bolsheviks like Zinoviev and Kamenev on trial.

=== Role in the Great Purge ===
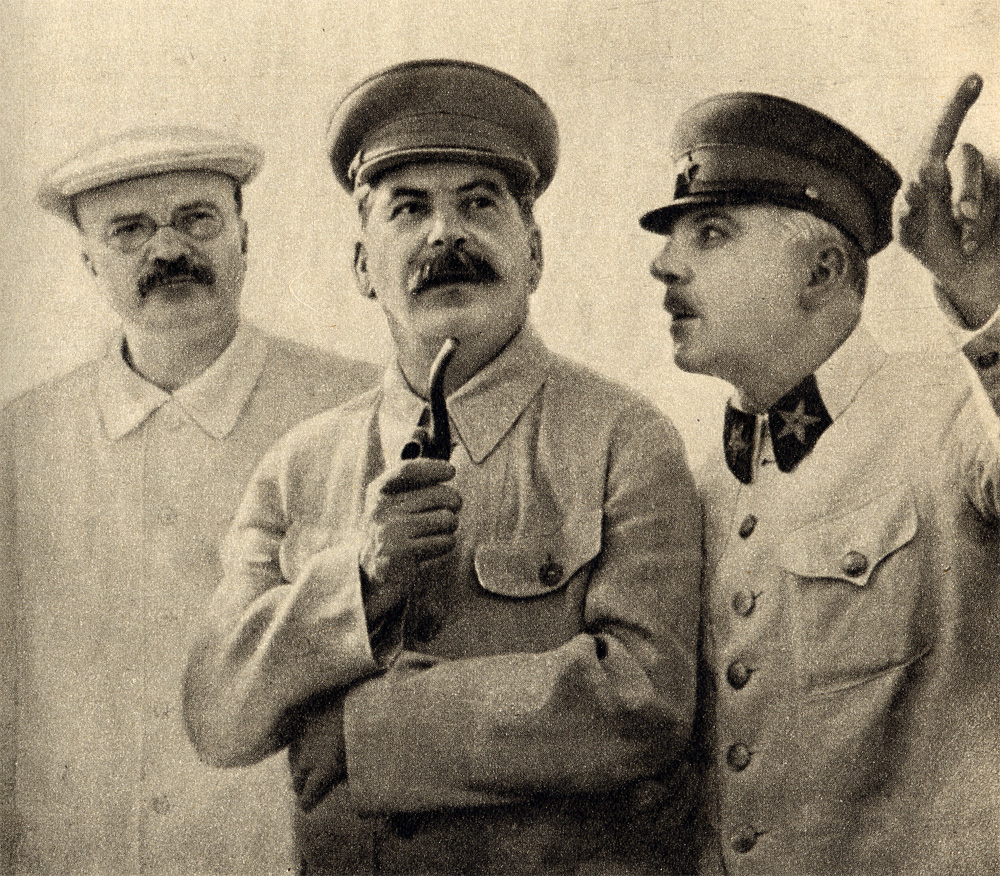
Molotov (left) with Stalin (centre) and Voroshilov (right) in 1937 during the great purge

After his return to favour, in August, Molotov supported Stalin throughout the purge, during which, in 1938 alone, 20 out of 28 People's Commissars in Molotov's Government were executed. After his deputy, Rudzutak, had been arrested, Molotov visited him in prison, and recalled years later that... "Rudzutak said he had been badly beaten and tortured. Nevertheless he held firm. Indeed, he seemed to have been cruelly tortured" ...but he did not intervene. During the Great Purge, he approved 372 documented execution lists, more than any other Soviet official, including Stalin. Molotov was one of the few with whom Stalin openly discussed the purges. When Stalin received a note denouncing the deputy chairman of Gosplan, G.I.Lomov, he passed it to Molotov, who wrote on it: "For immediate arrest of that bastard Lomov."

Before the Bolshevik revolution, Molotov had been a "very close friend" of a Socialist Revolutionary, Aleksandr Arosev, who shared his exile in Vologda. In 1937, fearing arrest, Arosev tried three times to ring Molotov, who refused to speak to him. He was arrested and shot. In the 1950s, Molotov gave Arosev's daughter his signed copies of her father's books, but later wished he had kept them. "It appears that it was not so much the loss of his 'very close friend' but the loss of part of his own book collection ... that Molotov continued to regret."

Late in life, Molotov described his role in purges of the 1930s, arguing that despite the over-breadth of the purges, they were necessary to avoid Soviet defeat in World War II:

Socialism demands immense effort. And that includes sacrifices. Mistakes were made in the process. But we could have suffered greater losses in the war – perhaps even defeat – if the leadership had flinched and had allowed internal disagreements, like cracks in a rock. Had leadership broken down in the 1930s we would have been in a most critical situation, many times more critical than actually turned out. I bear responsibility for this policy of repression and consider it correct. Admittedly, I have always said grave mistakes and excesses were committed, but the policy on the whole was correct.

== Minister of Foreign Affairs ==
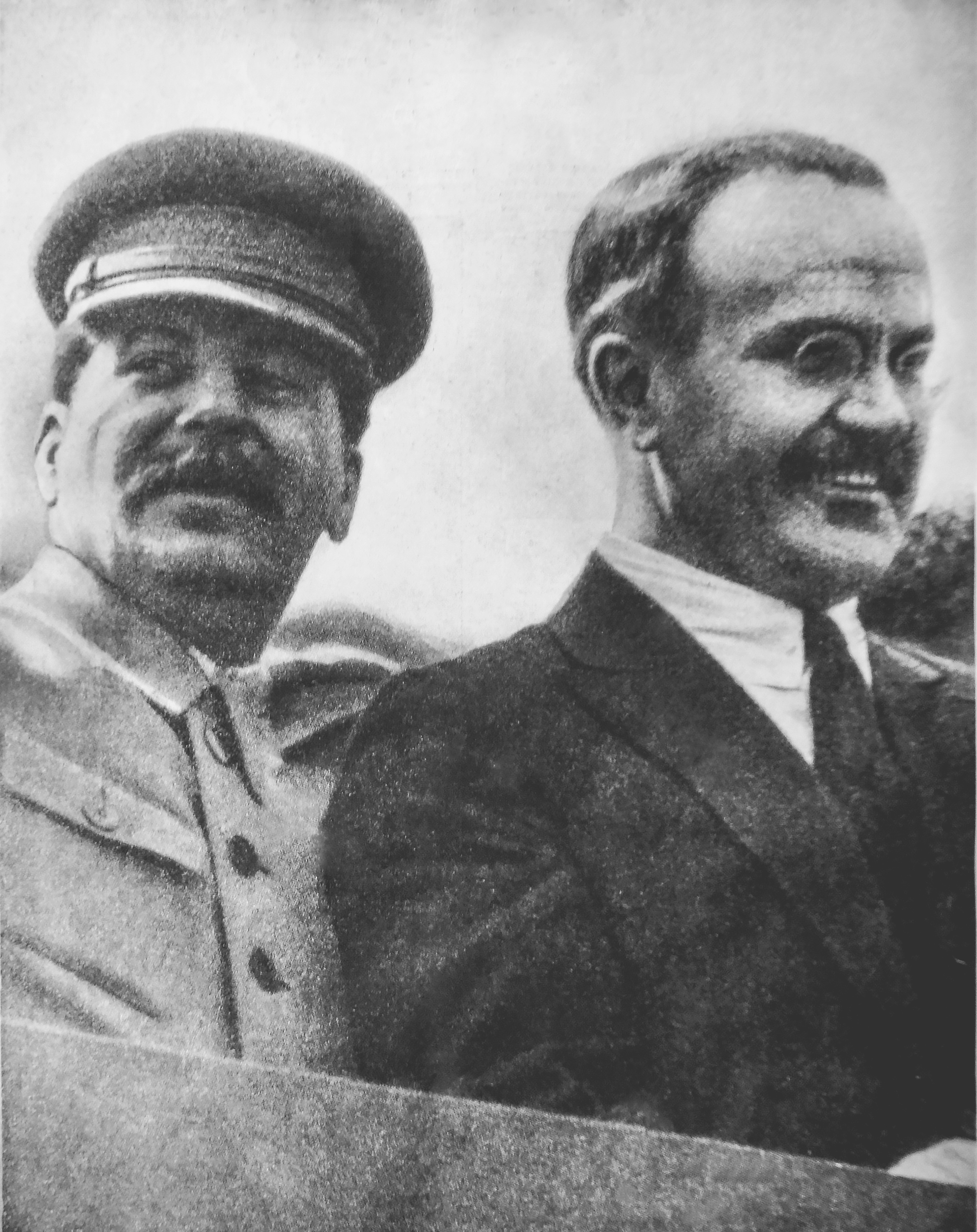
Molotov and Stalin in 1932

In 1939, Adolf Hitler's invasion of the rest of Czechoslovakia, in violation of the 1938 Munich Agreement, made Stalin believe that Britain and France, which had signed the agreement, would not be reliable allies against German expansion. That made him decide instead to seek to conciliate Nazi Germany. In May 1939, Maxim Litvinov, the People's Commissar for Foreign Affairs, was dismissed; Molotov was appointed to succeed him. Relations between Molotov and Litvinov had been bad. Maurice Hindus in 1954 stated in his book Crisis in the Kremlin:

It is well known in Moscow that Molotov always detested Litvinov. Molotov's detestation for Litvinov was purely of a personal nature. No Moscovite I have ever known, whether a friend of Molotov or of Litvinov, has ever taken exception to this view. Molotov was always resentful of Litvinov's fluency in French, German and English, as he was distrustful of Litvinov's easy manner with foreigners. Never having lived abroad, Molotov always suspected that there was something impure and sinful in Litvinov's broad-mindedness and appreciation of Western civilisation.

Litvinov had no respect for Molotov, regarding him as a small-minded intriguer and accomplice in terror.

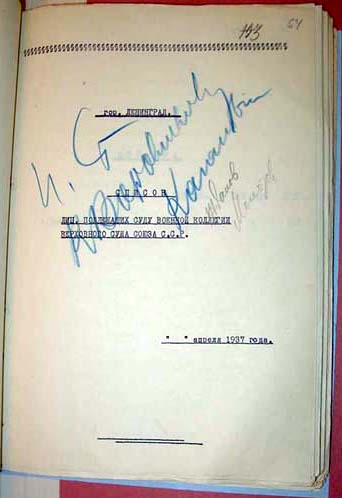
A list from the Great Purge signed by Molotov, Stalin, Voroshilov, Kaganovich, and Zhdanov

Molotov was succeeded in his post as premier by Stalin.

At first, Hitler rebuffed Soviet diplomatic hints that Stalin desired a treaty; but in early August 1939, Hitler allowed Foreign Minister Joachim von Ribbentrop to begin serious negotiations. A trade agreement was concluded on 18 August, and on 22 August Ribbentrop flew to Moscow to conclude a formal non-aggression treaty. Although the treaty is known as the Molotov–Ribbentrop Pact, it was Stalin and Hitler, not Molotov and Ribbentrop, who decided the content of the treaty.

The most important part of the agreement was the secret protocol providing for the partition of Poland, Finland, and the Baltic States between Nazi Germany and the Soviet Union and for the Soviet annexation of Bessarabia (then part of Romania, now Moldova). The protocol gave Hitler the green light for his invasion of Poland, which began on 1 September.

The pact's terms authorised Hitler to occupy two-thirds of Western Poland and the whole of Lithuania. Molotov was given a free hand in relation to Finland. In the Winter War, a combination of fierce Finnish resistance and Soviet mismanagement resulted in Finland losing much of its territory but not its independence. The pact was later amended to allocate Lithuania to the Soviets in exchange for a more favourable border in Poland for Germany. The annexations led to horrific suffering and loss of life in the countries occupied and partitioned by both dictatorships. On 5 March 1940, Lavrentiy Beria gave Molotov, along with Anastas Mikoyan, Kliment Voroshilov and Stalin, a note proposing the execution of 25,700 Polish anti-Soviet officers in what has become known as the Katyn massacre.

In November 1940, Stalin sent Molotov to Berlin to meet Ribbentrop and Hitler. In January 1941, British Foreign Secretary Anthony Eden visited Turkey in an attempt to get the Turks to enter the war on the Allies' side. The purpose of Eden's visit was anti-German, rather than anti-Soviet, but Molotov assumed otherwise. In a series of conversations with Italian Ambassador Augusto Rosso, Molotov claimed that the Soviets would soon be faced with an Anglo–Turkish invasion of the Crimea. The British historian D.C. Watt argued that on the basis of Molotov's statements to Rosso, it would appear that, in early 1941, Stalin and Molotov viewed Britain, rather than Germany, as the principal threat.

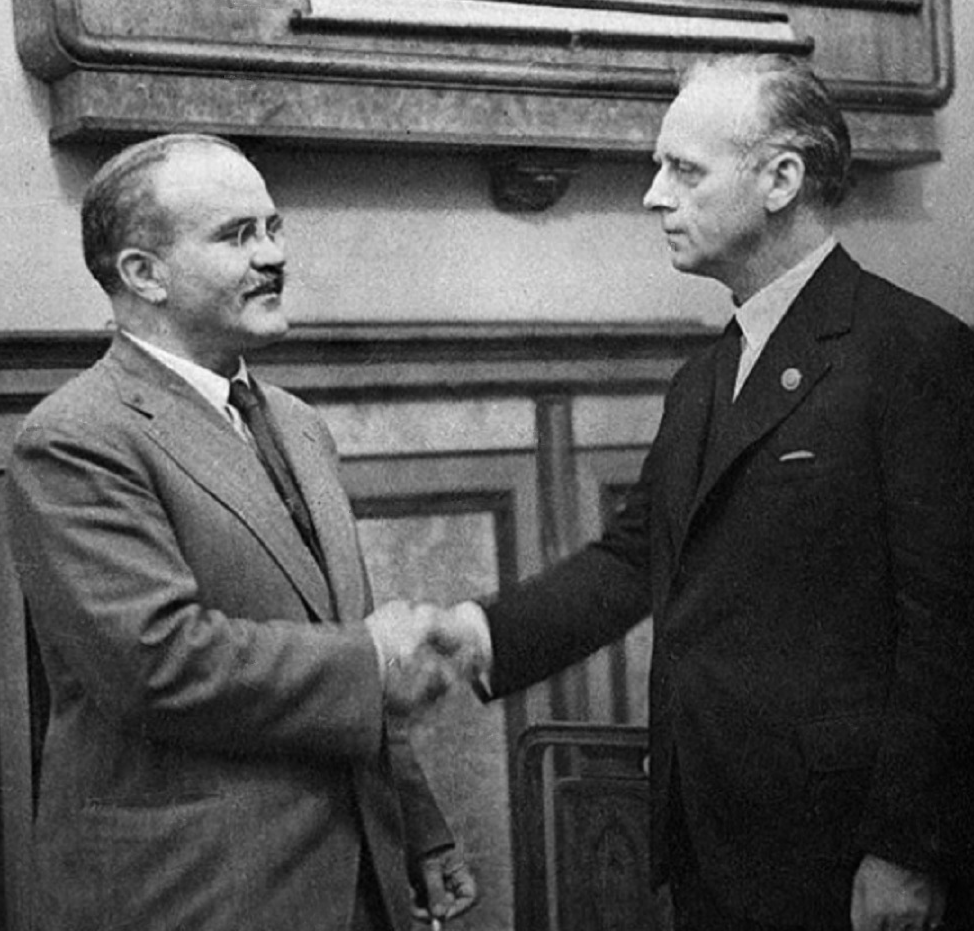
Molotov meets with Joachim von Ribbentrop before they sign the German–Soviet Pact.

The Molotov–Ribbentrop Pact governed Soviet–German relations until June 1941, when Hitler turned east and invaded the Soviet Union. Molotov was responsible for telling the Soviet people of the attack when he, instead of Stalin, announced the war. His speech, broadcast by radio on 22 June, characterised the Soviet Union in a role similar to that articulated by Winston Churchill in his early wartime speeches. The State Defence Committee was established soon after Molotov's speech. Stalin was elected chairman and Molotov was elected deputy chairman.

After the German invasion, Molotov conducted urgent negotiations with the British and then the Americans for wartime alliances. He took a secret flight to Scotland, where he was greeted by Eden. The risky flight in a high-altitude Tupolev TB-7 bomber flew over German-occupied Denmark and the North Sea. From there, he took a train to London to discuss the possibility of opening a second front against Germany.

After signing the Anglo–Soviet Treaty of 1942 on 26 May, Molotov left for Washington. He met US President Franklin D. Roosevelt and agreed on a lend-lease plan. Both the UK and the US only vaguely promised to open a second front against Germany. On his flight back to the Soviet Union, his plane was attacked by German fighters and later mistakenly by Soviet fighters.

There is no evidence that Molotov ever persuaded Stalin to pursue a different policy from that on which he had already decided. Volkogonov could not find one case where any of the elite in government openly disagreed with Stalin.

There is some evidence that, although Stalin realised he needed Molotov, Stalin did not like him. Stalin's one-time bodyguard, Amba, stated: "More general dislike for this statesman robot and for his position in the Kremlin could scarcely be wished and it was apparent that Stalin himself joined in this feeling". Amba asked the question:

"What then has made Stalin collaborate so closely with him? There are many more talented people in the Soviet Union and Stalin no doubt had the means to find them. Is he afraid of close collaboration with a more human and sympathetic assistant?"

At a jolly party, Amba recalled an incident whereby Poskryobyshev approached Stalin and whispered in his ear. Stalin replied, "Does it have to be right away?" Everybody realised at once that the conversation was regarding Molotov. In half an hour, Stalin was informed of Molotov's arrival. Although the whispered conversation between Molotov and Stalin only lasted five minutes, the merriment of the gathering evaporated as everybody talked in hushed tones. Amba stated, "Then the blanket left. Instantly the gaiety returned". Vareykis said that "a gentle angel has flown past"; a Russian expression for when a sudden silence descends. Breaking the tension, Laurentyev quipped in a harsh Georgian accent, "Go, friendly soul". Out of those in attendance, Stalin laughed the loudest at Laurentyev's joke.

Stalin could be rude to Molotov. In 1942, Stalin took Molotov to task for his handling of the negotiations with the Allies. He cabled Molotov on 3 June:

"[I am] dissatisfied with the terseness and reticence of all your communications. You convey to us from your talks with Roosevelt and Churchill only what you yourself consider is important, and omit all the rest. Meanwhile, the instance [Stalin] would like to know everything. What you consider important and what you think unimportant. This refers to the draft of the communiqué as well. You have not informed us whose draft it is, whether it has been agreed with the British in full and why, after all, there could not be two communiqués, one concerning the talks in Britain and one concerning the talks in the USA. We are having to guess because of your reticence. We further consider it expedient that both communiqués should mention among other things the creation of a second front in Europe and that full understanding has been reached in this matter. We also consider that it is absolutely necessary both communiqués should mention the supply of war materials to the Soviet Union from Britain and the USA. In all the rest we agree with the contents of the draft communiqué you sent us".

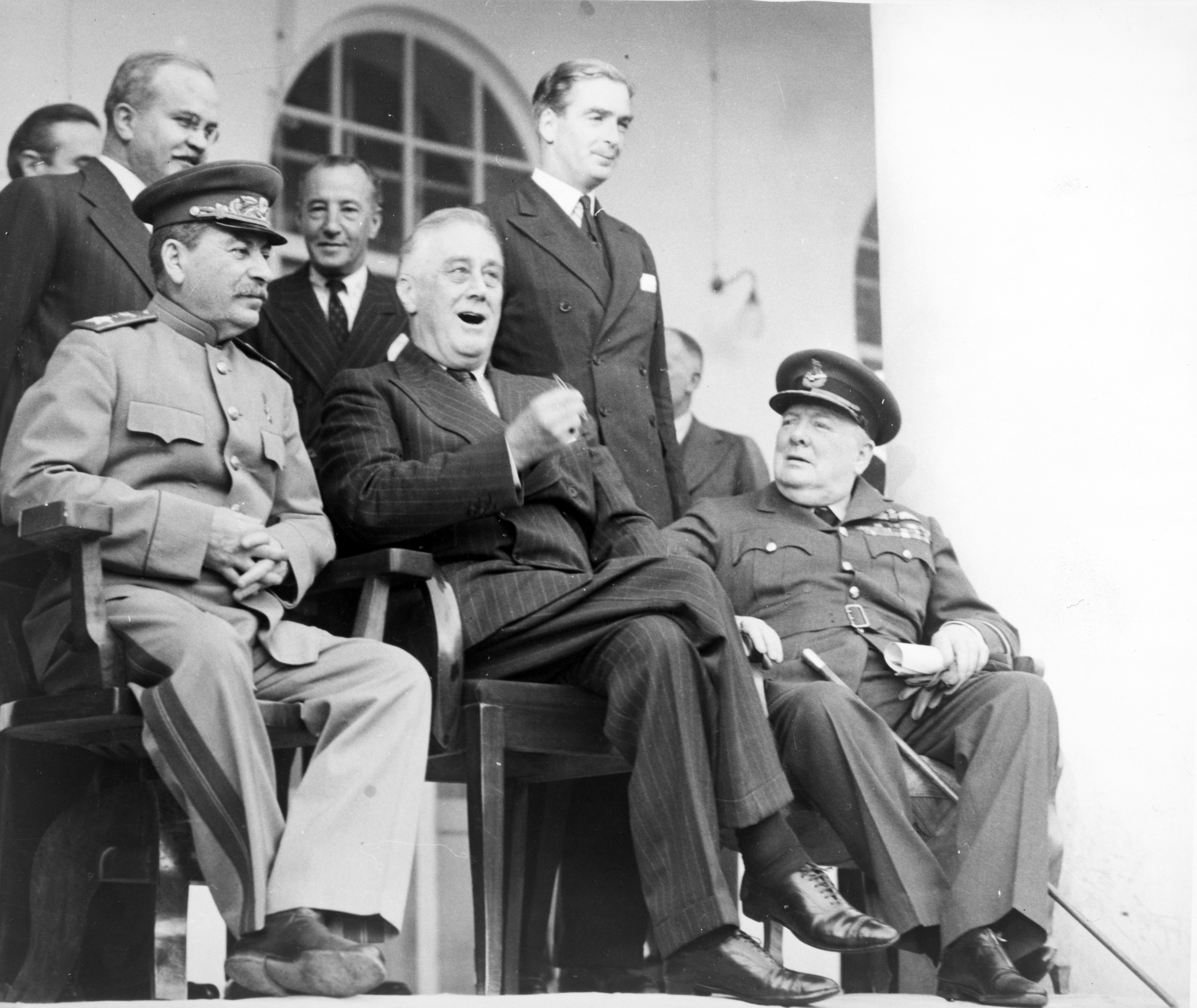
Stalin, Franklin D. Roosevelt, and Winston Churchill at the Tehran Conference in 1943; Molotov and Anthony Eden stand in the background.

When Beria told Stalin about the Manhattan Project and its importance, Stalin handpicked Molotov to be the man in charge of the Soviet atomic bomb project. However, under Molotov's leadership, the bomb and the project itself developed very slowly, and he was replaced by Beria in 1944 on the advice of Igor Kurchatov. When Roosevelt's successor as US President Harry S. Truman told Stalin that the US had created a bomb never seen before, Stalin relayed the conversation to Molotov and told him to speed up development. On Stalin's orders, the Soviet government substantially increased investment in the project. In a collaboration with Kliment Voroshilov, Molotov contributed both musically and lyrically to the 1944 version of the Soviet national anthem. Molotov asked the writers to include a line or two about peace. The role of Molotov and Voroshilov in the making of the new Soviet anthem was, in the words of the historian Simon Sebag-Montefiore, acting as music judges for Stalin.

Molotov accompanied Stalin to the Teheran Conference in 1943, the Yalta Conference in 1945, and, after the defeat of Germany, the Potsdam Conference. He represented the Soviet Union at the San Francisco Conference, which created the United Nations. In April 1945, shortly after the death of Franklin D. Roosevelt, Molotov engaged in talks with the new US President Harry S. Truman; these talks, despite not being hostile, came to be mythologised decades later as an early crack in US-Soviet relations harbingering the beginning of the Cold War. Even during the wartime alliance, Molotov was known as a tough negotiator and a determined defender of Soviet interests. Molotov lost his position of First Deputy chairman on 19 March 1946, after the Council of People's Commissars had been reformed as the Council of Ministers.

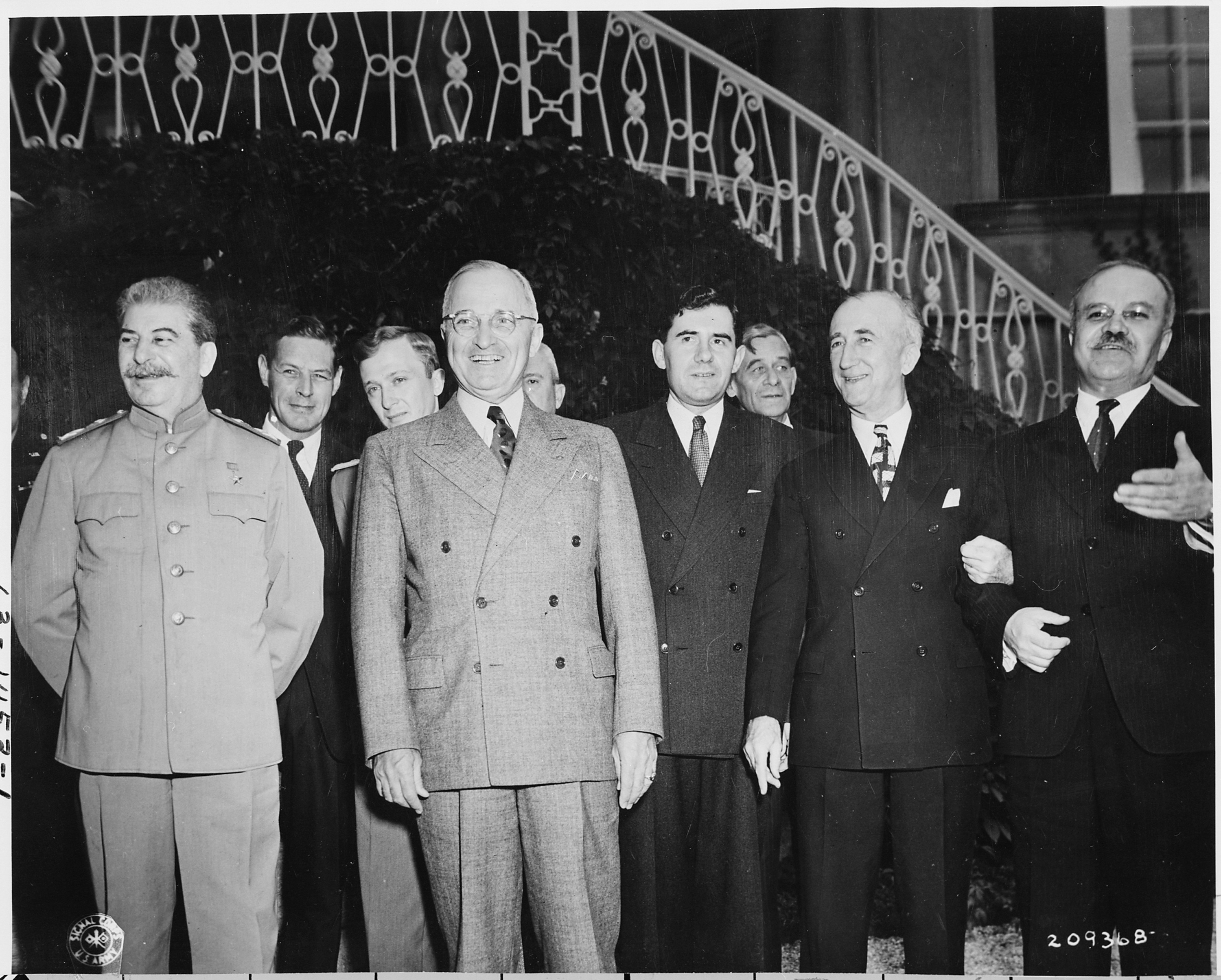
Stalin, Harry S. Truman, Andrei Gromyko, James F. Byrnes and Molotov meeting at the Potsdam Conference on 18 July 1945

From 1945 to 1947, Molotov took part in all four conferences of foreign ministers of the victorious states in the Second World War. In general, he was distinguished by an unco-operative attitude towards the Western powers. Molotov, at the direction of the Soviet government, condemned the Marshall Plan as imperialistic and claimed it was dividing Europe into two camps: one capitalist and the other communist. In response, the Soviet Union, along with the other Eastern Bloc nations, initiated what is known as the Molotov Plan. The plan created several bilateral relations between the states of Eastern Europe and the Soviet Union and later evolved into the Council for Mutual Economic Assistance (CMEA).

In the postwar period, Molotov's power began to decline. A clear sign of his precarious position was his inability to prevent the arrest for "treason" in December 1948 of his Jewish wife, Polina Zhemchuzhina, whom Stalin had long distrusted. Molotov initially protested the persecution against her by abstaining from the vote to condemn her, but later recanted, stating: "I acknowledge my heavy sense of remorse for not having prevented Zhemchuzhina, a person very dear to me, from making her mistakes and from forming ties with anti-Soviet Jewish nationalists", and divorced Zhemchuzhina.

Polina Zhemchuzhina befriended Golda Meir, who arrived in Moscow in November 1948 as the first Israeli envoy to the Soviet Union. There are unsubstantiated claims that, being fluent in Yiddish, Zhemchuzhina acted as a translator for a diplomatic meeting between Meir and her husband, the Soviet foreign minister. However, this claim (of being an interpreter) is not supported by Meir's memoir My Life. Presentation of her ambassadorial credentials was done in Hebrew, not in Yiddish. According to Meir's own account of the reception given by Molotov on 7 November, "Mrs. Zhemchuzhina has spent significant time during this reception not only talking to Golda Meir herself but also in conversation with Mrs. Meir's daughter Sarah and her friend Yael Namir about their life as kibbutzniks. They have discussed the complete collectivisation of property and related issues. At the end Mrs. Zhemchuzhina gave Golda Meir's daughter Sarah a hug and said: "Be well. If everything goes well with you, it will go well for all Jews everywhere."

Zhemchuzhina was imprisoned for a year in the Lubyanka and was then exiled for three years in an obscure Russian city. She was sentenced to hard labour, spending five years in exile in Kazakhstan. Molotov had no communication with her except for the scant news that he received from Beria, whom he loathed. Zhemchuzhina was freed immediately after the death of Stalin.

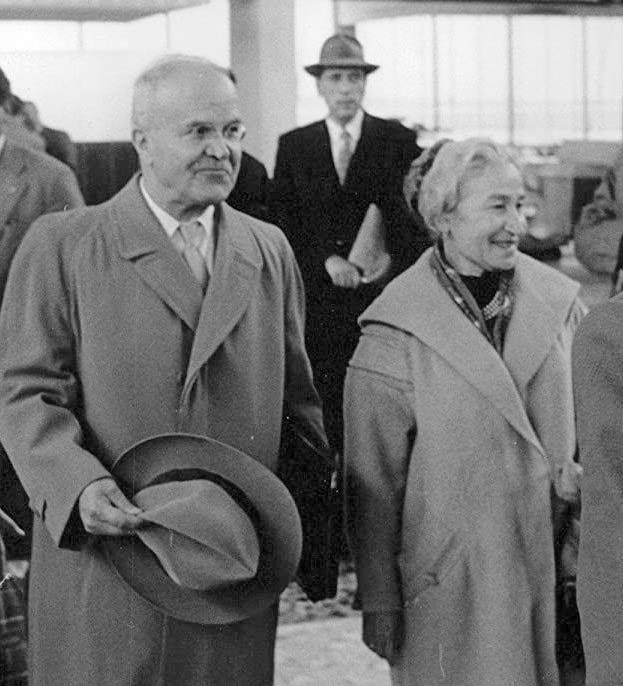
Molotov with his wife Polina in 1960

In 1949, Molotov was replaced as Foreign Minister by Andrey Vyshinsky but retained his position as First Deputy Premier and membership in the Politburo. Being appointed Foreign Minister by Stalin to replace the Jewish predecessor Maxim Litvinov to facilitate negotiations with Nazi Germany, Molotov was thus also dismissed from the same position at least in part because his wife was also of Jewish origin.

Molotov never stopped loving his wife, and it is said he ordered his maids to make dinner for two every evening to remind him that, in his own words, "she suffered because of me." According to Erofeev, Molotov said of her: "She's not only beautiful and intelligent, the only woman minister in the Soviet Union; she's also a real Bolshevik, a real Soviet person." According to Stalin's daughter, Molotov became very subservient to his wife. Molotov was a yes-man to his wife just as he was to Stalin.

== Postwar career ==
At the 19th Party Congress in 1952, Molotov was elected to the replacement for the Politburo, the Presidium, but was not listed among the members of the newly established secret body known as the Bureau of the Presidium, which indicated that he had fallen out of Stalin's favour. At the 19th Congress, Stalin said "there has been criticism of comrade Molotov and Mikoyan by the Central Committee," mistakes that included letting the British ambassador publish "bourgeois newspapers in our country". Both Molotov and Mikoyan were falling out of favour rapidly, with Stalin telling Beria, Khrushchev, Malenkov and Nikolai Bulganin that he no longer wanted to see Molotov and Mikoyan around.

For the reason that Molotov was the prime minister from 1930 to 1941 and the komissar of foreign affairs between the years of 1939-1949 Stalin considered Molotov as a potential successor. Therefore Stalin judged: Molotov was aimed to get liquidated but the death of Stalin, before the planned execution as known, saved Molotov's life then.

At his 73rd birthday, Stalin treated both with disgust. In his speech to the 20th Party Congress in 1956, Khrushchev told delegates that Stalin had plans for "finishing off" Molotov and Mikoyan in the aftermath of the 19th Congress.

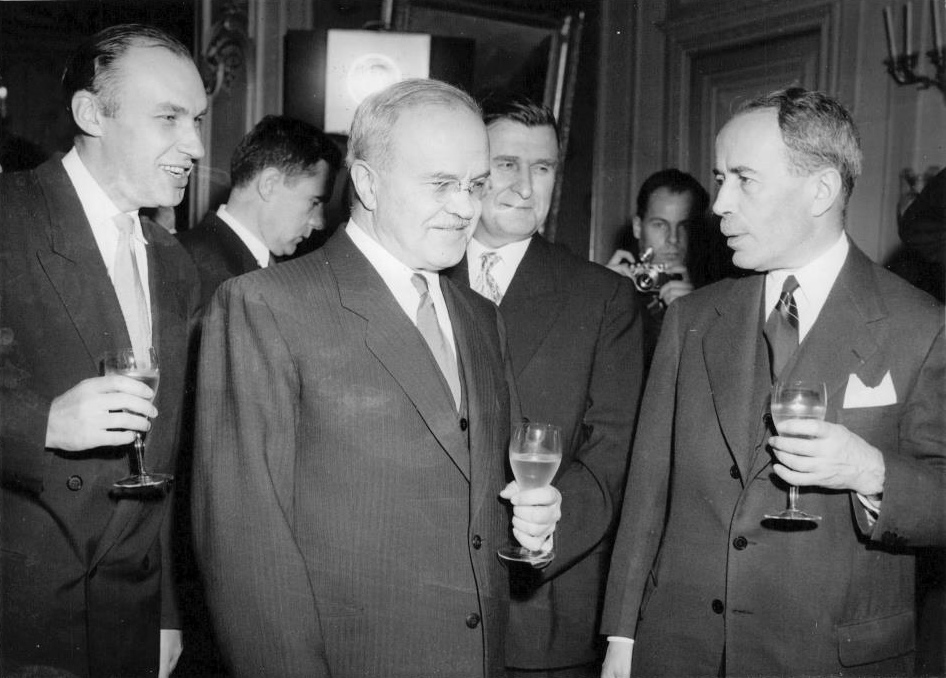
Molotov with French Foreign Minister Antoine Pinay at the Geneva Summit of 1955

Following Stalin's death, a realignment of the leadership strengthened Molotov's position. Georgy Malenkov, Stalin's successor in the post of General Secretary of the Communist Party of the Soviet Union, reappointed Molotov as Minister of Foreign Affairs on 5 March 1953. Although Molotov was seen as a likely successor to Stalin in the immediate aftermath of his death, he never sought to become leader of the Soviet Union. A triumvirate (a.k.a. troika) was established immediately after Stalin's death, consisting of Malenkov, Beria, and Molotov, but ended when Malenkov and Molotov deceived Beria. Molotov supported the removal and later the execution of Beria on the orders of Khrushchev. The new Party Secretary, Khrushchev, soon emerged as the new leader of the Soviet Union. He presided over a gradual domestic liberalisation and a thaw in foreign policy, as was manifest in a reconciliation with Josip Broz Tito's government in Yugoslavia, which Stalin had expelled from the communist movement. Molotov, an old-guard Stalinist, seemed increasingly out of place in the new environment, but represented the Soviet Union at the Geneva Conference of 1955.

Molotov's position became increasingly tenuous after February 1956, when Khrushchev launched an unexpected denunciation of Stalin at the 20th Congress of the Communist Party. Khrushchev attacked Stalin over the purges of the 1930s and the defeats of the early years of the Second World War, which he blamed on Stalin's overly-trusting attitude towards Hitler and the purges of the Red Army command structure. Molotov was the most senior of Stalin's collaborators still in government and had played a leading role in the purges, so it became evident that Khrushchev's examination of the past would probably result in the fall from power of Molotov, who became the leader of an old-guard faction that sought to overthrow Khrushchev.

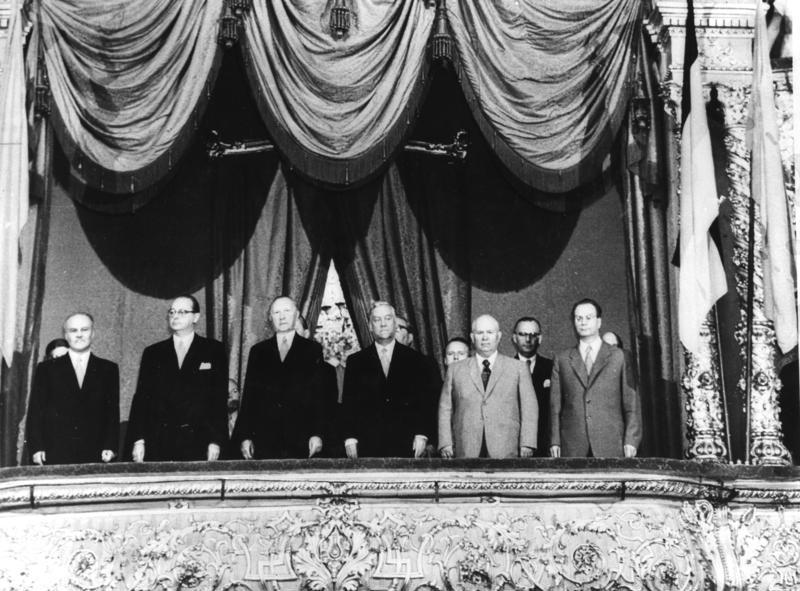
Molotov (far left) with Khrushchev (second from right) and Premier Nikolai Bulganin (to the left of Khrushchev) in 1955 at a gala reception in Moscow for the visit of West German Chancellor Konrad Adenauer (centre left)

In June 1956, Molotov was removed as Foreign Minister; on 29 June 1957, he was expelled from the Presidium (Politburo) after a failed attempt to remove Khrushchev as First Secretary. Although Molotov's faction initially won a vote in the Presidium 7–4 to remove Khrushchev, the latter refused to resign unless a Central Committee plenum decided so. In the plenum, which met from 22 to 29 June, Molotov and his faction were defeated. Eventually he was banished, being made ambassador to the Mongolian People's Republic. Molotov and his associates were denounced as "the Anti-Party Group" but notably were not subject to such unpleasant repercussions that had been customary for denounced officials in the Stalin years. In 1960, he was appointed Soviet representative to the International Atomic Energy Agency, which was seen as a partial rehabilitation. However, after the 22nd Party Congress in 1961, during which Khrushchev carried out his de-Stalinisation campaign, including the removal of Stalin's body from Lenin's Mausoleum, Molotov, along with Lazar Kaganovich, was removed from all positions and expelled from the Communist Party. In 1962, all of Molotov's party documents and files were destroyed by the authorities.

In retirement, Molotov remained unrepentant about his role under Stalin's rule. He suffered a heart attack in January 1962. After the Sino-Soviet split, it was reported that he agreed with the criticisms made by Mao Zedong of the supposed revisionism of Khrushchev's policies.

== Later life ==
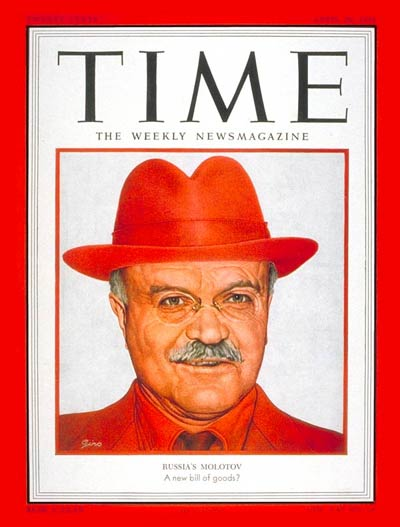
Vyacheslav Molotov on the cover of Time, 20 April 1953

In 1968, United Press International reported that Molotov had completed his memoirs but that they would likely never be published. The first signs of Molotov's rehabilitation were seen during Leonid Brezhnev's rule, when information about him was again allowed to be included in Soviet encyclopaedias. His connection, support and work in the Anti-Party Group were mentioned in encyclopaedias published in 1973 and 1974, but eventually disappeared altogether by the mid-to-late-1970s. Later, Soviet leader Konstantin Chernenko further rehabilitated Molotov. In 1984, Molotov was even allowed to seek membership in the Communist Party. A collection of interviews with Molotov from the period 1969 to 1986 was published in 1993 by Felix Chuev as Molotov Remembers: Inside Kremlin Politics.

In June 1986 Molotov was hospitalised in Kuntsevo Hospital in Moscow, where he eventually died, during the rule of Mikhail Gorbachev, on 8 November 1986. During his life, Molotov had suffered seven heart attacks, but survived to the age of 96. At the time of his death, he was the last surviving major participant in the events of 1917. He was buried in the Novodevichy Cemetery in Moscow. Lazar Kaganovich, another Old Bolshevik, died in 1991.

== Legacy ==
Molotov is remembered as Joseph Stalin's closest associate during the latter's period of supreme power, up until their relationship began to break down in 1952. No individual spent more time in business meetings with the supreme leader than Molotov, with official records in the Russian archives tallying his presence at official meetings with Stalin 2,927 times, for a total of 8,169 hours — 76.5% of all of Stalin's official meetings. No other member of Stalin's inner circle accrued even half as much direct contact with the vozhd in such meetings, reckoned either by meeting count or total time.

Molotov, like Stalin, was pathologically mistrustful of others; much crucial information has disappeared. As Molotov once said, "One should listen to them, but it is necessary to check up on them. The intelligence officer can lead you to a very dangerous position.... There are many provocateurs here, there, and everywhere." Molotov continued to claim in a series of published interviews that there never was a secret territorial deal between Stalin and Hitler during the Molotov–Ribbentrop Pact. Like Stalin, he never recognised the Cold War as an international event. He saw the Cold War as more or less the everyday conflict between communism and capitalism. He divided the capitalist countries into two groups: the "smart and dangerous imperialists" and the "fools." Before his retirement, Molotov had proposed establishing a socialist confederation with the People's Republic of China. Molotov believed that socialist states were part of a larger, supranational entity. In retirement, Molotov criticised Nikita Khrushchev for being a "right-wing deviationist."

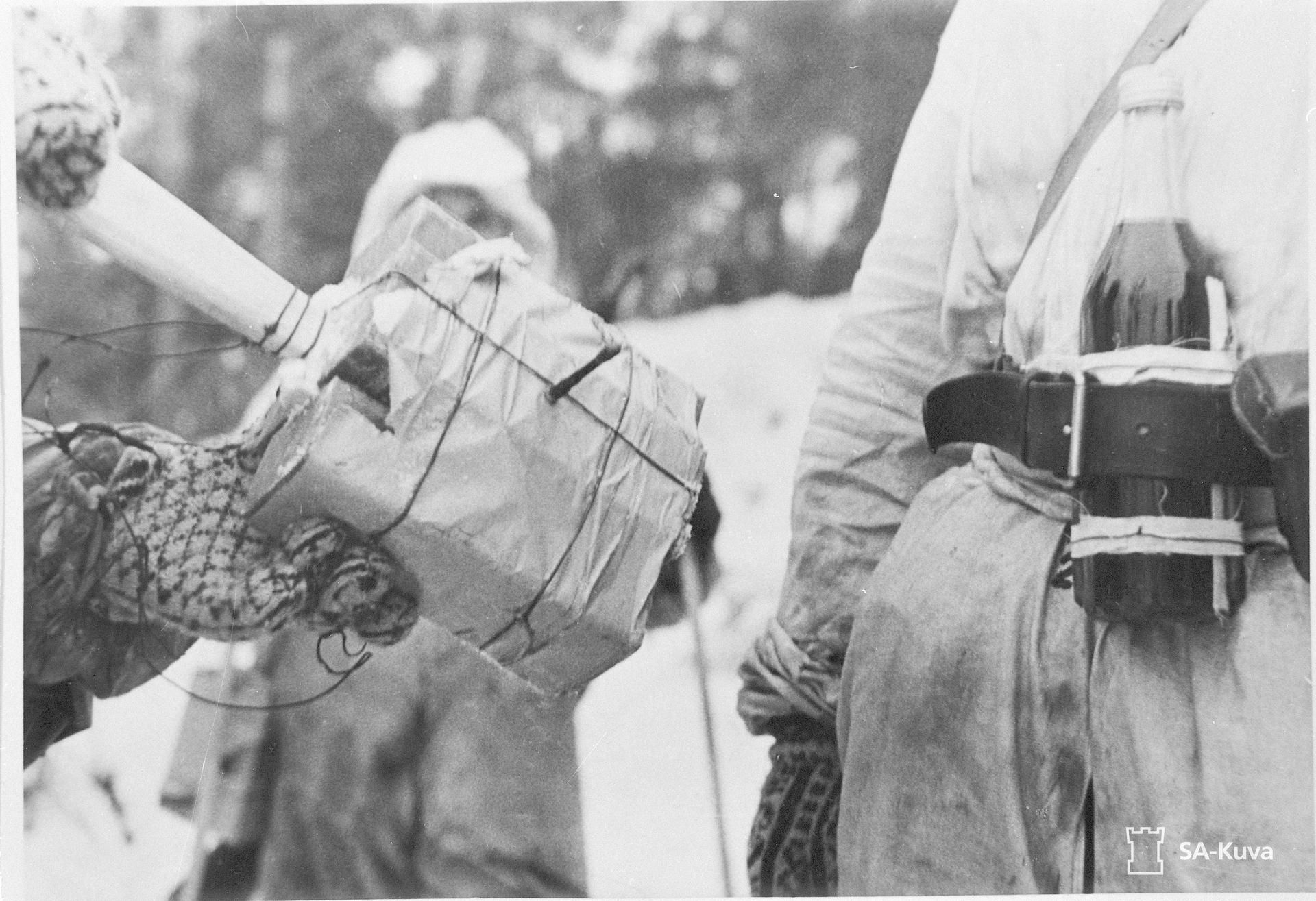
For lack of better weapons, Soviet tanks in the Winter War were often destroyed with satchel charges and Molotov cocktails, a name coined by the Finnish defenders. The name was a pejorative reference to the Soviet foreign minister.

"Molotov cocktail" is a term coined by the Finns during the Winter War, as a generic name used for a variety of improvised incendiary weapons. During the Winter War, the Soviet air force made extensive use of incendiaries and cluster bombs against Finnish civilians, troops and fortifications. When Molotov claimed in radio broadcasts that they were not bombing but rather delivering food to the starving Finns, the Finns started to call the air bombs Molotov bread baskets. Soon they responded by attacking advancing tanks with "Molotov cocktails," which were "a drink to go with the food." According to Montefiore, the Molotov cocktail was one part of Molotov's cult of personality that the vain Premier surely did not appreciate.

Winston Churchill lists many meetings with Molotov in his wartime memoirs. Acknowledging him as a "man of outstanding ability and cold-blooded ruthlessness," Churchill concluded: "In the conduct of foreign affairs, Mazarin, Talleyrand, Metternich, would welcome him to their company, if there be another world to which Bolsheviks allow themselves to go." The former US Secretary of State John Foster Dulles said: "I have seen in action all the great international statesmen of this century. I have never seen such personal diplomatic skill at so high a degree of perfection as Molotov's."

In January 2010, a Ukrainian court accused Molotov and other Soviet officials of organising a man-made famine in Ukraine in 1932–33. The same Court then ended criminal proceedings against them, as the trial would be posthumous.

== Portrayals in media ==
- Luther Adler portrayed Molotov in the 1958 Playhouse 90 episode The Plot to Kill Stalin.
- Clive Merrison was cast as Molotov in the 1992 drama film Stalin.
- Michael Palin was cast as Molotov in the 2017 satire film The Death of Stalin.
- Russian actor Sergey Shanin portrayed a member of the Soviet Politburo named after, and closely resembling, Molotov in the 2023 video game Atomic Heart.

== Decorations and awards ==
- Soviet cruiser Molotov was named for him in 1937.
- Hero of Socialist Labour (1943)
- Four Orders of Lenin (1940, 1943, 1945, 1950)
- Order of the Badge of Honour
- Medal "For the Defence of Moscow" (1944)
- Medal "For the Victory over Germany in the Great Patriotic War 1941–1945" (1945)
- Medal "For Valiant Labour in the Great Patriotic War 1941–1945" (1945)
- Medal "In Commemoration of the 800th Anniversary of Moscow" (1947)
- Medal "Veteran of Labour" (1974)
- Jubilee Medal "In Commemoration of the 100th Anniversary of the Birth of Vladimir Ilyich Lenin" (1969)
- Jubilee Medal "Forty Years of Victory in the Great Patriotic War 1941–1945" (1985)
- Order of the Red Banner (Mongolia)

== See also ==
- Outline of the Russian Revolution and Civil War
- Bibliography of the Russian Revolution and Civil War
- Bibliography of Stalinism and the Soviet Union
- Index of Old Bolsheviks
- Index of articles related to the Russian Revolution and Civil War
- Foreign relations of the Soviet Union
- Germany–Soviet Union relations, 1918–1941
- Molotov cocktail
- Molotov Line

== Citations ==
Political offices
Preceded by Alexey Rykov	Chairman of the Council of People's Commissars; 1930–1941	Succeeded by Joseph Stalin
Preceded by Maxim Litvinov	Minister of Foreign Affairs; 1939–1949; 1953–1956	Succeeded by Andrey Vyshinsky
Preceded by Andrey Vyshinsky	Minister of Foreign Affairs; 1939–1949; 1953–1956	Succeeded by Dmitri Shepilov
Preceded by Vasiliy Pisarev	Soviet Ambassador to Mongolia; 1957–1960	Succeeded by Alexei Khvorostukhin
Preceded by Leonid Zamiatin	Soviet Representative to International Atomic Energy Agency; 1960–1962	Succeeded by Panteleimon Ponomarenko
Party political offices
Preceded by position created (chairman of revkom)	Secretary of the Communist Party of Donetsk Governorate; 1920–1920	Succeeded by Taras Kharchenko; Andrei Radchenko
Preceded by Stanislav Kosior (temporary)	First Secretary of the Communist Party of Ukraine; 1920–1921	Succeeded by Feliks Kon (acting)
Preceded by Nikolai Uglanov	Secretary of the Communist Party of Moscow Governorate; 1928–1929	Succeeded by Karl Bauman
