= Yevgeny Tyazhelnikov =

Soviet politician and diplomat (1928–2020)

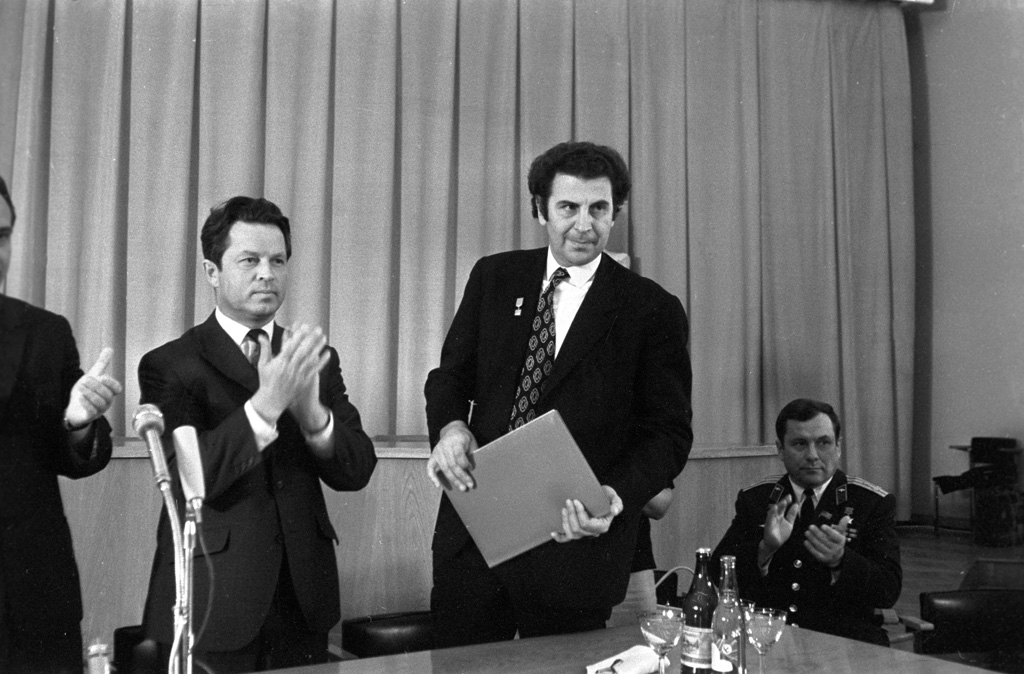
Tyazhelnikov (left) with Mikis Theodorakis

Yevgeny Mikhailovich Tyazhelnikov (Russian: Евгений Михайлович Тяжельников; 7 January 1928 – 15 December 2020) was a Soviet politician, party official, and diplomat. He served as the First Secretary of the All-Union Leninist Communist Youth League (Komsomol) from 1968 to 1977, head of the Propaganda Department of the CPSU Central Committee from 1977 to 1982, and Ambassador of the Soviet Union to Romania from 1982 to 1990.

A member of the CPSU Central Committee from 1971 to 1990 and a deputy to the Supreme Soviet of the Soviet Union from 1968 to 1984, Tyazhelnikov was a prominent figure of the Brezhnev era. His leadership of the Komsomol coincided with several major Soviet youth mobilisation campaigns, including the construction of the Baikal–Amur Mainline.

== Early life and education ==
Tyazhelnikov was born on 7 January 1928 in the village of Verkhnyaya Sanarka, in what is now Plastovsky District, Chelyabinsk Oblast, into a peasant family. He joined the Komsomol in 1943 and the CPSU in 1951.

In 1950, he graduated with honours from the Chelyabinsk State Pedagogical University, where he had studied on the physics and mathematics faculty. He remained at the institute as an assistant lecturer in the department of Marxism–Leninism, simultaneously serving as secretary of the institute's Komsomol committee (1950–1952). He completed postgraduate study at the same institution in 1956 and was awarded the degree of Candidate of Sciences in historical sciences in 1960. He received the academic title of dotsent (associate professor) in 1962.

== Career ==
=== Komsomol and party work in Chelyabinsk (1952–1968) ===
From 1952 to 1954, Tyazhelnikov served as deputy head of the propaganda and agitation department of the Chelyabinsk Oblast Komsomol committee. He subsequently held various Komsomol posts in the Chelyabinsk region before returning to the Chelyabinsk Pedagogical Institute, where he was appointed rector in 1961, serving until 1964.

In 1964, he was appointed a secretary of the Chelyabinsk Oblast committee (obkom) of the CPSU, a position he held until 1968.

=== First Secretary of the Komsomol (1968–1977) ===
In June 1968, Tyazhelnikov was appointed First Secretary of the Central Committee of the All-Union Leninist Communist Youth League, replacing Sergei Pavlov, who had been removed along with four members of the Komsomol central committee and numerous provincial officials. A 1968 report in TIME noted that Tyazhelnikov's appointment was unusual: at forty years old, he had not been involved in Komsomol work for approximately ten years, and his elevation bypassed the Komsomol's own constitutional requirement that the first secretary be selected from among members of its central committee.

During his nine-year tenure as Komsomol leader, Tyazhelnikov oversaw the mobilisation of young workers for a number of major construction projects, most notably the Baikal–Amur Mainline (BAM), as well as campaigns related to the development of Siberia and the Russian Far East. He was elected a full member of the CPSU Central Committee in 1971.

=== Head of the CPSU Propaganda Department (1977–1982) ===
In 1977, Tyazhelnikov was transferred from the Komsomol to the position of head of the Department for Agitation and Propaganda of the CPSU Central Committee, one of the most important ideological posts in the Soviet party apparatus. He held this position until 1982.

=== Ambassador to Romania (1982–1990) ===
Following the death of Brezhnev and the succession of Yuri Andropov as General Secretary in late 1982, Tyazhelnikov was reassigned from party work and appointed Extraordinary and Plenipotentiary Ambassador of the Soviet Union to the Socialist Republic of Romania, serving from 27 December 1982 to 7 June 1990.

During his embassy tenure, Tyazhelnikov served as the principal channel of communication between the Soviet and Romanian leaderships. A diplomatic record preserved in the Russian State Archive of Contemporary History documents a conversation in August 1989 in which Tyazhelnikov relayed a message from Romanian leader Nicolae Ceaușescu to Mikhail Gorbachev, expressing alarm at the formation of a non-communist government in Poland under Tadeusz Mazowiecki and urging the Soviet Union to take urgent measures to prevent what Ceaușescu called the destruction of socialism in Poland.

In 1990, following the Romanian Revolution, Tyazhelnikov was recalled from Bucharest at the insistence of the new Romanian authorities. He was transferred to the disposal of the Soviet Ministry of Foreign Affairs and subsequently retired from diplomatic service.

== Awards ==
Tyazhelnikov received the following state awards:

- Order of Lenin (1971, 1988)
- Order of the October Revolution (1976)
- Order of the Red Banner of Labour (1966)
- Order of Friendship of Peoples (1980)
- Order of Merit for the Fatherland, 4th class (2018)

== Selected publications ==
- Pokoriteli tseliny [Conquerors of the Virgin Lands], Chelyabinsk, 1957
- Deyatel'nost' komsomola po vypolneniyu leninskikh zavetov [The Komsomol's Work in Fulfilling Lenin's Behests], Moscow: Molodaya Gvardiya, 1974
- Soyuz molodykh lenintsev [Union of Young Leninists], 2nd ed., Moscow: Politizdat, 1980
- Oni byli pervymi: lidery Leninskogo komsomola (1918–1968) [They Were the First: Leaders of the Lenin Komsomol], Moscow: Molodaya Gvardiya, 2013. ISBN 978-5-235-03603-1

== Death ==
Tyazhelnikov died on 15 December 2020 in Moscow, at the age of 92.

Party political offices
Preceded by Sergei Pavlov	First Secretary of the Komsomol Central Committee; 1968–1977	Succeeded by Boris Pastukhov
