= Secretariat of the 12th Congress of the Russian Communist Party (Bolsheviks) =

Secretariat of the 12th Congress

26 April 1923 – 2 June 1924

The Secretariat of the 12th Congress of the Russian Communist Party (Bolsheviks) was in session from 26 April 1923 to 2 June 1924.

== Composition ==
=== Members ===
Name (birth–death)	Took office	Left office	Duration	Note
Andrei Andreyev (1895–1971)	3 February 1924	31 May 1924	118 days	Elected at the 8th Plenary Session.
Vyacheslav Molotov (1890–1986)	26 April 1923	31 May 1924	1 year, 35 days	—
Joseph Stalin (1878–1953)	26 April 1923	31 May 1924	1 year, 35 days	Elected General Secretary at the 1st Plenary Session.
Jānis Rudzutaks (1887–1936)	26 April 1923	2 February 1924	282 days	Relieved of his duties on the orders of the 12th Politburo.

=== Candidate members ===
Name (birth–death)	Took office	Left office	Duration	Note
Vasily Mikhailov (1894–1937)	14 June 1923	31 May 1924	354 days	Was elected on the orders of the 12th Politburo.
Isaak Zelensky (1887–1938)	14 June 1923	31 May 1924	354 days	Was elected on the orders of the 12th Politburo.
