= Gleb Ivashentsov =

Russian diplomat

Gleb Aleksandrovich Ivashentsov (Russian: Глеб Александрович Ивашенцов; born 7 June 1945) is a Russian diplomat and researcher, holding the rank of Ambassador Extraordinary and Plenipotentiary. He has been the Deputy Director at the Russian Centre for APEC Studies since 2010.

== Early life and education ==
Ivashentsov graduated from the Moscow State Institute of International Relations in 1967.

== Diplomatic career ==
Ivashentsov served as the Soviet and Russian Consul General to Bombay (present-day Mumbai) from 1991 to 1995, and as the Russian Ambassador to Myanmar from 1997 to 2001. He also served as the Russian Ambassador to South Korea.

He served as the Director of the Second Asian Department (2AD) and the Third Asian Department (3AD) of the Ministry of Foreign Affairs.

== Awards and recognition ==
Ivashentsov was awarded the Order of Friendship in 2003 and the Khanhwa Medal for diplomatic merit from South Korea in 2009.
