= Secretariat of the 14th Congress of the All-Union Communist Party (Bolsheviks) =

The Secretariat of the 14th Congress of the All-Union Communist Party (Bolsheviks) was in session from 1925 to 1927.

== Composition ==
=== Members ===
Name (birth–death)	Took office	Left office	Duration	Note
Grigory Yevdokimov (1884–1936)	1 January 1926	9 April 1926	97 days	Relieved of his duties at the 2nd Plenary Session.
Stanislav Kosior (1889–1939)	1 January 1926	19 December 1927	1 year, 351 days	—
Vyacheslav Molotov (1890–1986)	1 January 1926	19 December 1927	1 year, 351 days	—
Nikolai Uglanov (1886–1937)	1 January 1926	19 December 1927	1 year, 351 days	—
Joseph Stalin (1878–1953)	1 January 1926	19 December 1927	1 year, 351 days	Elected General Secretary at the 1st Plenary Session.

=== Candidate members ===
Name (birth–death)	Took office	Left office	Duration	Note
Aleksandra Artyukhina (1889–1969)	1 January 1926	19 December 1927	1 year, 351 days	—
Andrei Bubnov (1883–1938)	1 January 1926	19 December 1927	1 year, 351 days	—
Nikolay Kubiak (1881–1937)	1 January 1926	19 December 1927	1 year, 351 days	—
Nikolay Shvernik (1888–1970)	9 April 1926	16 April 1927	1 year, 7 days	Elected at the 2nd Plenary Session. Relieved of his duties at the 4th Plenary Session.
