= Sergei Pavlov (politician) =

- Сергей Павлов
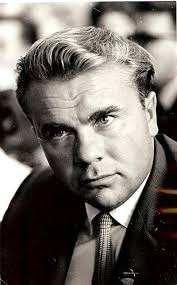
- Pavlov in 1966

Soviet Ambassador to Burma
- In office 1 June 1985 – 22 August 1990
- Preceded by: Vladimir Kuznetsov
- Succeeded by: Vadim Shabalin

Soviet Ambassador to Mongolia
- In office 18 February 1983 – 4 April 1985
- Preceded by: Aleksandr Smirnov (born 1912)
- Succeeded by: Konstantin Fomichenko

Chairman of the Physical Culture and Sports Committee of the Soviet Union
- In office June 1968 – 12 January 1983
- Preceded by: Yuri Mashin
- Succeeded by: Marat Gramov

First Secretary of the Komsomol
- In office 25 March 1959 – 12 June 1968
- Preceded by: Vladimir Semichastny
- Succeeded by: Yevgeny Tyazhelnikov

Personal details
- Born: 19 January 1929 Moscow, Soviet Union
- Died: 7 October 1993 (aged 64) Moscow, Russia
- Resting place: Kuntsevo Cemetery, Moscow
- Party: CPSU
- Education: SCOLIPE

Sergei Pavlovich Pavlov (Russian: Сергей Павлович Павлов) (19 January 1929 – 7 October 1993) was a Soviet youth leader, hardline politician and diplomat.

== Career ==
Sergey Pavlov was born in Rzhev into a family of a peasant father and a noble mother. His maternal grandfather, Nikolai Timofeevich Vasiliev, graduated from the St. Petersburg Conservatory and worked as a conductor. Maternal grandmother Glafira Sergeevna Pylaeva came from a hereditary family of clergymen. His paternal grandfather, Pyotr Pavlov was captured by the Germans during the First World War, and learnt how to make confectionary while he was a prisoner of war. Sergei's father, Pavel Pavlov, was the choirmaster in Rzhev, and his mother was a pianist. Sergei and his mother were evacuated after the German invasion in 1941, while his father organised a choir on the front line. After his return, Sergei went to an agricultural college in Rzhev, and then the Moscow Institute of Physical Education, where he was appointed secretary of the Komsomol (Communist Youth League) committee. He worked as a full-time Komsomol official for seven years, and in 1959 was appointed the First Secretary of Komsomol, the youngest holder of that office in 25 years. In October 1961, he was made a member of the Central Committee of the Communist Party of the Soviet Union.

Pavlov was a protégé and ally of Alexander Shelepin, who was appointed head of Komsomol shortly before the death of Joseph Stalin, and was the head of the KGB at the time when Pavlov took over control of Komosomol. Unlike Shelepin, Pavlov was not involved in the coup that removed Nikita Khrushchev from power in 1964, because he was in Tokyo for the Olympic Games at the time, but he was part of the faction that opposed the relaxing of censorship and de-Stalinisation initiated by Khrushchev.

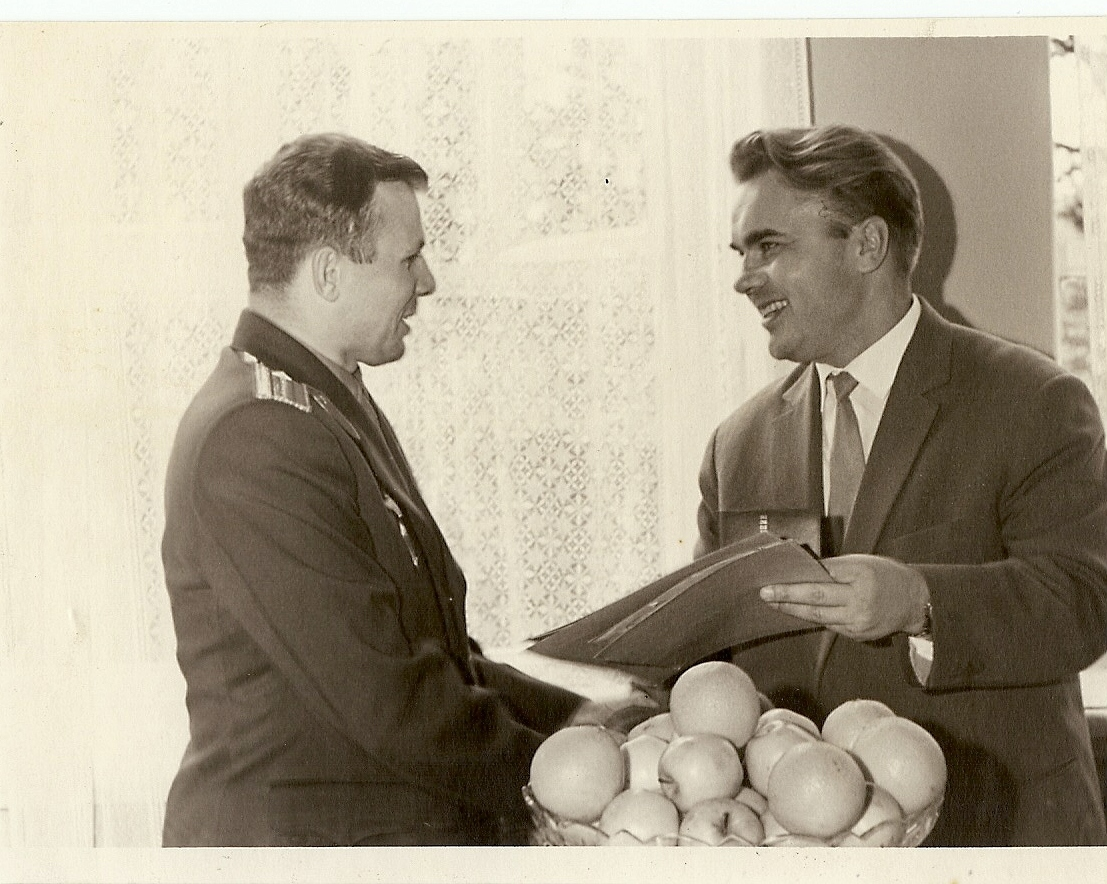
Yuri Gagarin and Sergey Pavlov. Moscow. 15 April 1961

In March 1963, he published an article in Pravda, attacking the literary journal Novy Mir over its publication of the memoirs of Ilya Ehrenburg, a short story by the future Nobel prize winner Aleksandr Solzhenitsyn, and other items which Pavlov thought should have been suppressed. Speaking to foreign correspondents the following month, he attacked the poet Yevgeny Yevtushenko.

In August 1965, Pavlov was the first Soviet official post-Khrushchev who tried to halt and begin to reverse the criticism of Stalin's record, summed up as his 'cult of personality'. Writing in Pravda on 29 August 1965, Pavlov claimed:

One can hardly justify a certain unilateral approach by some theoreticians and writers who view entire stages in the history of socialist society exclusively through the prism of the adverse consequences of the cult of personality. Such a unilateral approach does not help to promote patriotism, or to impart to young people a correct understanding of the history of our country. The 1930s, for instance, (i.e. the time of the Great Purge) have often been depicted in sombre colours only.

In 1967–68, the party leader, Leonid Brezhnev carried out a purge of officials associated with Shelepin, including the head of the KGB, Vladimir Semichastny, who was sacked and replaced by loyalist Yuri Andropov. Pavlov was removed from the office in June 1968. Four members of the Komsomol central committee and 'countless' local officials were also sacked. The new 'youth' leader appointed in Pavlov's place was Yevgeny Tyazhelnikov, who was 40 years old and had not been involved in Komsomol for at least seven years.

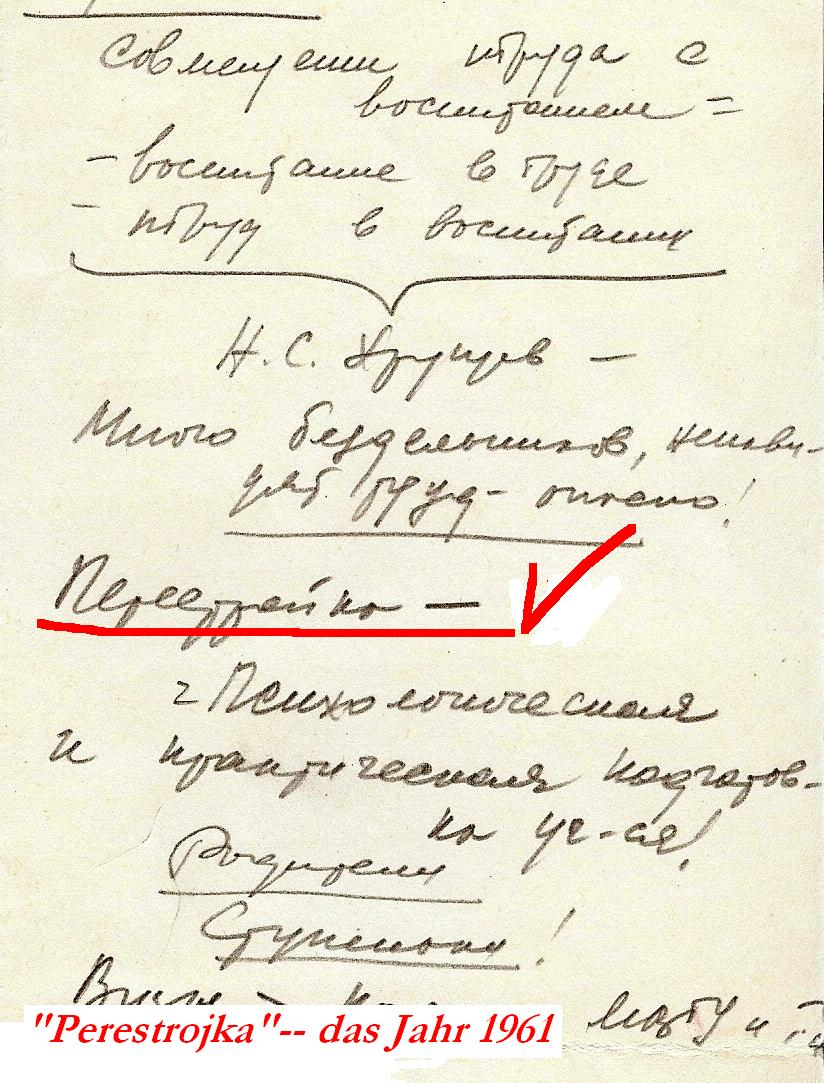
Sergei Pavlov's archive. Note about the idea of Perestroika in 1961 on the outline of Nikita Khrushchev's report

On the other hand, it was Pavlov who developed the idea of “Perestroika” in the early 1960s, which his subordinate Mikhail Gorbachev did not support. A document has been preserved in which Pavlov writes “perestroika” on Khrushchev's report.

Pavlov was a close friend of the first cosmonaut Yuri Gagarin (1934–1968), whose death he considered a political assassination.

In 1968–1983, Pavlov was the Chairman of the Committee for Physical Culture for Sport, or the Soviet 'Minister for Sport'.

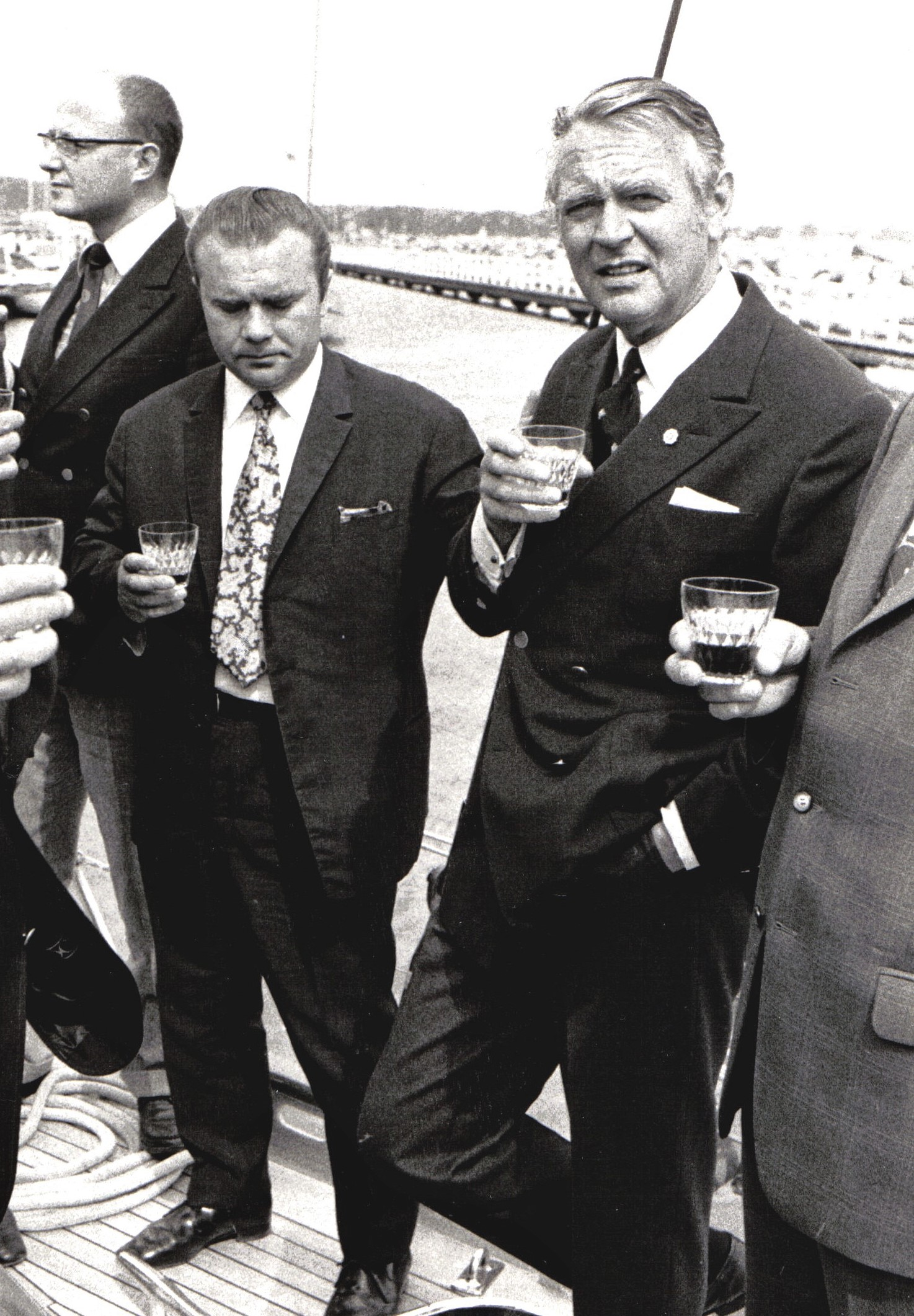
Bertold Beitz and Sergey Pavlov, 1972

He headed the Soviet delegation at the Winter and Summer Olympic Games in 1968, 1972, 1976 and 1980. During the parade of nations, as the head of the Soviet delegation and chairman of the USSR Sports Committee who held this post for 15 years, Pavlov typically walked in front of the entire Soviet team.

One of the most striking events of his tenure at this post was the 1980 Summer Olympics in Moscow, in which his organizational skills, authority and friendly ties in the sports world of the planet played a role, for example, with the Adi Dassler family (Adi Dassler, founder of Adidas) and his daughter Brigitte Benkler-Dassler, with the President of the NOC of Liechtenstein and member of the IOC Baron Eduard von Falz-Fein, the President of the NOC of Germany Willy Daume, the German businessman Berthold Beitz (Krupp Company), the President of the Mexican NOC Pedro Ramirez Vazquez and others.

In 1983, Yuri Andropov, who had succeeded Brezhnev as party leader, dismissed Pavlov, and appointed him as Ambassador to Mongolia, and later Ambassador to Burma. He was forced to retire in 1989, aged 60, and died four years later.
