= List of ambassadors of Russia to Myanmar =

Ambassador of the Russian Federation to the Republic of the Union of Myanmar
- Emblem of the Russian Foreign Ministry

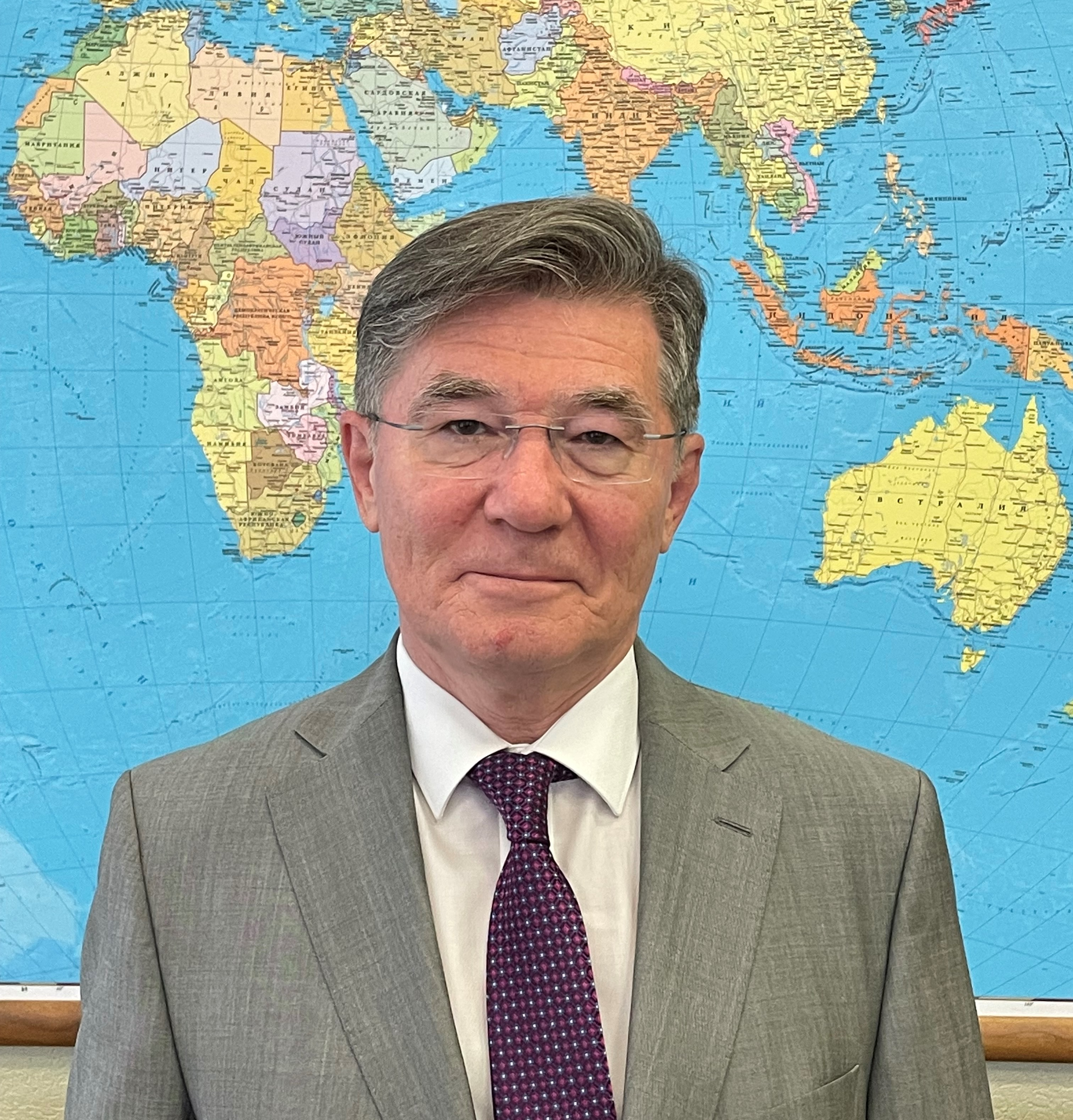
- Incumbent; Iskander Azizov since 23 June 2023
- Ministry of Foreign Affairs; Embassy of Russia in Yangon
- Style: His Excellency
- Reports to: Minister of Foreign Affairs
- Seat: Yangon
- Appointer: President of Russia
- Term length: At the pleasure of the president
- Website: Russian Embassy in Myanmar

The ambassador extraordinary and plenipotentiary of the Russian Federation to the Republic of the Union of Myanmar is the official representative of the president and the government of the Russian Federation to the president and the government of Myanmar.

The ambassador and his staff work at large in the Embassy of Russia in Yangon. The post of Russian ambassador to Myanmar is currently held by Iskander Azizov, incumbent since 23 June 2023.

== History of diplomatic relations ==
Diplomatic relations between the Soviet Union and what was then known as Burma were first established on 28 February 1948, with an agreement to exchange ambassadors. The first Soviet ambassador, Aleksandr Saveliyev, was appointed on 4 October 1950, and presented his credentials on 21 May 1951. Following the dissolution of the Soviet Union in 1991, the incumbent Soviet ambassador, Vadim Shabalin, continued as representative of the Russian Federation until 1992.

== List of representatives (1950–present) ==
=== Soviet Union to Burma (1950–1991) ===
Name	Title	Appointment	Termination	Notes
Aleksandr Saveliyev	Ambassador	4 October 1950	23 May 1952	
Peter Vladimirov	Ambassador	23 May 1952	10 September 1953	
Aleksey Shchiborin	Ambassador	15 June 1954	9 June 1959	
Andrey Ledovsky	Ambassador	9 June 1959	1 March 1966	
Aleksei Rodionov	Ambassador	1 March 1966	11 November 1968	
Nikolai Smirnov	Ambassador	28 January 1969	28 May 1971	
Aleksey Elizavetin	Ambassador	28 May 1971	1 January 1977	
Sergey Gruzinov	Ambassador	1 January 1977	11 August 1980	
Vladimir Kuznetsov	Ambassador	11 August 1980	1 July 1985	
Sergey Pavlov	Ambassador	1 July 1985	22 August 1990	
Vadim Shabalin	Ambassador	22 August 1990	25 December 1991	

=== Russian Federation to Myanmar (1991–present) ===
Name	Title	Appointment	Termination	Notes
Vadim Shabalin	Ambassador	25 December 1991	22 April 1992	
Valery Nazarov	Ambassador	1 September 1992	14 June 1997	
Gleb Ivashentsov	Ambassador	14 June 1997	19 November 2001	
Oleg Kabanov	Ambassador	19 November 2001	25 September 2006	
Mikhail Mgeladze	Ambassador	25 September 2006	16 October 2012	
Vasily Pospelov	Ambassador	16 October 2012	1 July 2016	
Nikolai Listopadov	Ambassador	1 July 2016	23 June 2023	
Iskander Azizov	Ambassador	23 June 2023		
