= Secretariat of the 10th Congress of the Russian Communist Party (Bolsheviks) =

Politburo of the 10th Congress

16 March 1921 – 3 April 1922

The Secretariat of the 10th Congress of the Russian Communist Party (Bolsheviks) was in session from 16 March 1921 to 3 April 1922.

== Composition ==
| Name (birth–death) | Took office | Left office | Duration | Note |
|---|---|---|---|---|
| Vasily Mikhailov (1894–1937) | 16 March 1921 | 3 April 1922 | 1 year, 18 days | — |
| Vyacheslav Molotov (1890–1986) | 16 March 1921 | 3 April 1922 | 1 year, 18 days | Elected Executive Secretary at the 1st Plenary Session. |
| Yemelyan Yaroslavsky (1878–1943) | 16 March 1921 | 8 August 1921 | 145 days | Relieved of his duties at the 4th Plenary Session. |
