= Donetsk Gubernatorial Committee of the Communist Party of Ukraine =

Regional branch of the Communist Party of (Bolsheviks) Ukraine in Donetsk Governorate

The Donetsk Gubernatorial Committee of the Communist Party of Ukraine, commonly referred to as the Donetsk CPU gubkom, was a regional branch of the Communist Party of (Bolsheviks) Ukraine in Donetsk Governorate.

The Donetsk Governorate was established on 5 February 1920 out of parts of Yekaterinoslav Governorate, Kharkov Governorate, and Don Host Oblast. Due to difficult situation in the region, the governorate was governed by a local revolutionary committee (revkom). The gubernatorial committee was finally established in September 1920.

== Chairmen ==
=== Donets Gubernatorial Revolutionary Committee (1920) ===
Name	Term of Office		Life years
Name	Start	End	Life years
Vladimir Antonov-Saratovsky	1920	1920	1884-1965

=== Kiev Gubernatorial Committee (1920-1925) ===
Name	Term of Office		Life years
Name	Start	End	Life years
Vyacheslav Molotov	September 1920	November 1920	1890–1986
Taras Kharchenko	December 1920	January 1921	1893–1937
Andrei Radchenko	1920	1921	1887–1938
Emmanuil Kviring	1921	April 1923	1888–1937
Aleksandr Krinitsky	1923	1924	1894–1937
Andrei Radchenko	1924	1925	1887–1938

== Chairpersons ==
=== Ispolkom of Soviet (1920-1925) ===
Name	Term of Office		Life years
Name	Start	End	Life years
Fyodor Sergeev (Artyom)	26 April 1920	1920	1883–1921
Yakov Drobnis	October 1920	December 1920	1890–1937
Moisei Rukhimovich	December 1920	1922	1889–1938
Mikhail Chernov	1923	1925	1891–1938

== Districts ==
In 1923 the Ukrainian SSR was split into okruhas (not to be confused with okrugs).

The Donetsk Governorate was initially split into 7 okruhas centered in following cities: Bakhmut, Luhansk, Mariupol, Yuzovka, Starobilsk, Taganrog, and Shakhty.

=== Yuzivka-Stalino Okruha Committee (1925-1930) ===
Name	Term of Office		Life years
Name	Start	End	Life years
Konstantin Moiseenko	1924	1927	1895–1937
Vasiliy Stroganov	1927	July 1930	1888–1938

== See also ==
- Administrative divisions of Ukraine (1918–1925)
- Governor of Donetsk Oblast
- Governor of Luhansk Oblast
- Donetsk Regional Committee of the Communist Party of Ukraine
- Luhansk Regional Committee of the Communist Party of Ukraine
