= Rakovski =

Rakovski may refer to:

== Places ==
- Rakovski (town), a town in Plovdiv Province, Bulgaria
- Rakovski, Dobrich Province, a village in Dobrich Province, Bulgaria
- Rakovski, Razgrad Province, a village in Razgrad Province, Bulgaria

== People with the surname ==
- Abraham Abba Rakovski (1854–1921), writer and translator
- Georgi Sava Rakovski (1821–1867), Bulgarian revolutionary
- Christian Rakovsky (1873–1941), Bulgarian-born Bolshevik politician

== See also ==
- Rakowski
- Rakovsky
