= Vladimir Orlov =

Vladimir Orlov may refer to:

- Vladimir Orlov (politician) (1921–1999), Chairman of the Presidium of the Supreme Soviet of the Russian SFSR, 1985-1988
- Vladimir Orlov (speed skater) (born 1938), Russian speed skater
- Vladimir Orlov (author) (1936–2014), Russian fiction writer
- Vladimir Grigorevich Orlov (1743-1831), Russian director of St Petersburg Academy of Sciences 1766-74
- Vladimir Orlov (economist), Minister of Finance of the USSR in 1991
- Vladimir Mitrofanovich Orlov (1895–1938), Russian military leader
- Vladimir Nikolayevich Orlov (1868–1927), Russian military commander and equestrian who represented the Russian Empire at the 1900 Summer Olympics
