= People's Commissariat for Finance =

People's Commissariat for Finance may refer to:

- People's Commissariat for Finance of the USSR
- People's Commissariat for Finance of the RSFSR
- People's Commissariat for Finance of the Ukrainian SSR
- People's Commissariat for Finance of the BSSR
- People's Commissariat for Finance of the GSSR
- People's Commissariat for Finance of the KSSR
