= Rakowski =

Rakowski (feminine: Rakowska;) is a Polish surname. It is related to various surnames in other languages.

== Related surnames ==
Language	Masculine	Feminine
Polish	Rakowski	Rakowska
Belarusian (Romanization)	Ракоўскі (Rakouski, Rakoŭski)	Ракоўская (Rakouskaya, Rakouskaia, Rakoŭskaja)
Bulgarian (Romanization)	Раковски (Rakovski)	Раковска (Rakovska)
Czech/Slovak	Rakovský	Rakovská
Hungarian	Rakovszky, Rakovszki	
Latvian	Rakovskis	Rakovska
Lithuanian	Rakauskas	Rakauskienė (married); Rakauskaitė (unmarried)
Romanian	Racovschi	
Russian (Romanization)	Раковский (Rakovskiy, Rakovsky, Rakovski, Rakovskij)	Раковская (Rakovskaya, Rakovskaia, Rakovskaja)
Ukrainian (Romanization)	Раковський (Rakovskyi, Rakovskyy, Rakovskyj)	Раковська (Rakovska)
Other	Rakowsky, Rakouskas, Rakofsky	

== People ==
- Abraham Abba Rakowski (1854–1921), writer and translator
- Adrian Rakowski (born 1990), Polish football player
- Bronisław Rakowski (1895–1950), Polish general
- David Rakowski (born 1958), American composer
- John Rakowski (born 1948), Australian boxer
- Joseph Rakowski, American politician
- Lukáš Rakowski (born 1982), Czech figure skater
- Mary Rakowski DuBois, American chemist
- Mieczysław Rakowski (1926–2008), Polish politician
- Richard Rakowski (born 1952), American entrepreneur
- Teresa Rakowska-Harmstone (1927–2017), Polish-Canadian political scientist
- Georgi Sava Rakovski (1821–1867), Bulgarian revolutionary, and an important figure of the Bulgarian National Revival and resistance against Ottoman rule.
