= Nikolai Bryukhanov =

Soviet politician

- Николай Брюханов
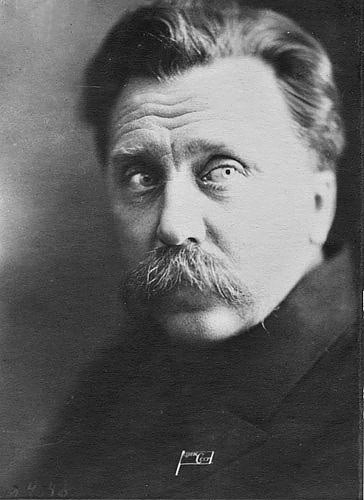
- Bryukhanov in 1928

People's Commissar for Finance of the USSR
- In office 16 January 1926 – 15 October 1930
- Premier: Alexey Rykov
- Preceded by: Grigory Sokolnikov
- Succeeded by: Hryhoriy Hrynko

People's Commissar for Food of the USSR
- In office 6 July 1923 – 9 May 1924
- Premier: Vladimir Lenin
- Preceded by: None—post created
- Succeeded by: None—post abolished

People's Commissar for Food of the RSFSR
- In office December 1921 – 1923
- Premier: Vladimir Lenin
- Preceded by: Alexander Tsiurupa
- Succeeded by: Moses I. Kalmanovich

Personal details
- Born: Nikolai Pavlovich Bryukhanov; 16 December 1878 Simbirsk, Simbirsk Governorate, Russian Empire
- Died: 1 September 1938 (aged 59) Moscow, Union of Soviet Socialist Republics
- Party: RSDLP (1902–1903); RSDLP (Bolsheviks) (1903–1918); Russian Communist Party (1918–1938)

Nikolai Pavlovich Bryukhanov (Note: Russian: Никола́й Па́влович Брюха́нов; sometimes transliterated as Briukhanov.) (party aliases Andrey and Andrey Simbirsky; literary alias N. Pavlov; December 28, 1878 – September 1, 1938) was a Russian Bolshevik, Soviet statesman and political figure who served as People's Commissar of Finance between 1926 and 1930. Until recently, his date of death was believed to have been June 30, 1943; in fact he was executed on September 1, 1938.

== Biography ==
Born at Simbirsk in a family of Russian ethnicity, his father was a land surveyor from the nobility. Bryukhanov was expelled from Moscow University in 1899 for his political activities, readmitted under an amnesty, only to be expelled again in 1901.

He then enrolled in Kazan University, became involved in revolutionary activities again, and joined the Russian Social Democratic Labour Party (RSDLP) in 1902, becoming a member of its regional committee in Kazan in 1903. In that same year, he was arrested and deported to Vologda.

In 1904, he was in prison in Moscow, when he heard for the first time about the split that had occurred in August 1903 between Vladimir Lenin's Bolsheviks and Julius Martov's Mensheviks, and sided with the Bolsheviks. He was a Bolshevik delegate to the RSDLP Congress in London in 1907. In 1907 Bryukhanov moved to Ufa, where he edited the party's local newspaper Ufimsky Rabochiy (The Ufa Worker).

During the Russian Revolution of 1917, Bryukhanov was the head of the Bolshevik committee in Ufa and, after the Bolshevik seizure of power in October 1917, became a member of the regional revolutionary committee and its Commissar of Supplies. In February 1918 he was made a member of the collegium (governing body) of the Peoples' Commissariat of Supplies and in June 1918, he became Deputy People's Commissar with responsibilities for food supplies in the Moscow region. From August 1919, Bryukhanov simultaneously served as Chairman of the Special Supplies Commission of the Eastern Front and then, from January 1920 until September 1922, as head of the Main Supplies Directorate of the Red Army.

Bryukhanov was put in charge of the People's Commissariat of Supplies in December 1921. With the creation of the USSR in December 1922, Bryukhanov became the first head of the People's Commissariat of Supplies of the new federation on July 6, 1923. On May 14, 1924, the Commissariat was abolished and Bryukhanov was made deputy People's Commissar of Finance. When the head of the Commissariat, Grigory Sokolnikov, supported Grigory Zinoviev and Lev Kamenev in their unsuccessful opposition to the Soviet leader Joseph Stalin in late 1925, Stalin replaced Sokolnikov with the apolitical and less influential Bryukhanov on January 18, 1926. At the 15th Party Congress in December 1927, Bryukhanov was elected candidate (non-voting) member of the Central Committee of the Soviet Communist Party, a position which he kept until the 17th Party Congress in January 1934.

During 1930, the government ordered the printing of millions of paper rubles to finance the rapid industrialisation of the Soviet economy. This created a situation in which peasant farmers and others with goods to sell insisted on being paid with coins rather than paper money. To meet a shortage, Bryukhanov recommended importing silver, as a short term measure, and switching to nickel. He was supported by the head of the State Bank, Georgy Pyatakov, but angered Stalin, who drew an obscene cartoon during a meeting of the Politburo on 5 April 1930, with the caption: "For all his sins, past and present, hang Bryukhanov by the balls. If the balls hold out, consider him acquitted by trial. If they do not hold, drown him in the river."

In July 1930, Leonid Yurovsky, a leading economist employed by the Commissariat of Finance was arrested and accused of being a member of a non-existent "Peasants Labour Party", led by Nikolai Kondratiev, and was later shot. In letter to Vyacheslav Molotov, written at about the same time as Yurovsky's arrest, Stalin claimed that it was Yurovsky, and not Bryukhanov, who ran the commissariat, and instructed:

It is thus important to a) fundamentally purge the Finance and Gosbank bureaucracy, despite the wails of dubious Communists like Bryukhanov-Pyatakov; b) definitely shoot two or three dozen wreckers from these apparaty, including several dozen common cashiers.

Bryukhanov and Pyatakov were sacked on October 15, 1930. Bryukhanov was replaced with Grigori Fyodorovich Grinko and appointed Deputy Chairman of the executive committee of the Moscow Oblast Soviet. In April 1931, he was made Deputy People's Commissar of Supplies of the USSR. He also served as Deputy Chairman of the Sovnarkom's Central Commission on grain yields in 1933–1937.

Bryukhanov was arrested by the NKVD secret police on February 3, 1938, during the Great Purge. He was sentenced to death and executed on September 1, 1938.

The Soviet government cleared him of all charges in 1956 as part of the first wave of destalinization. However, the date of his death was given as June 30, 1943 as part of the government's policy to downplay the extent of the Great Purge by falsifying the dates of its victims' deaths.

== Notes ==
Political offices
Preceded by Grigory Sokolnikov	People's Commissar for Finance; 1926 – 1930	Succeeded by Hryhoriy Hrynko
