= Hryhoriy Hrynko =

Ukrainian revolutionary and Soviet bureaucrat (1890–1938)

- Григорій Гринько
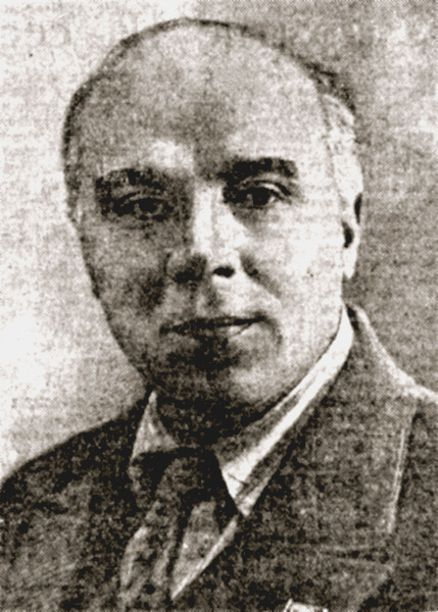
- Hrynko in 1937

People's Commissar for Finance
- In office 18 October 1930 – 13 August 1937
- Premier: Vyacheslav Molotov
- Preceded by: Nikolai Bryukhanov
- Succeeded by: Vlas Chubar

Personal details
- Born: 30 November 1890 Shtepivka, Russian Empire
- Died: 15 March 1938 (aged 47) Kommunarka shooting ground, Moscow Oblast, Russian SFSR, Soviet Union
- Party: Russian Communist Party (Bolsheviks) (from 1919 or 1920)
- Other political affiliations: Ukrainian Socialist-Revolutionary Party (1917–1918); Borotbists (1918); Communist Party (Bolshevik) of Ukraine (from 1918)
- Occupation: Bureaucrat
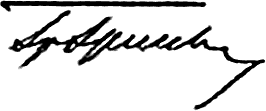
- Signature

Military service
- Allegiance: Russian Empire
- Branch/service: Imperial Russian Army
- Years of service: 1913–1917
- Rank: Private
- Unit: Ekaterinoslav Grenadier Regiment
- Battles/wars: World War I; Eastern Front

Hryhoriy Fedorovych Hrynko (Ukrainian: Григорій Федорович Гринько; 30 November [O.S. 18 November] 1890 – 15 March 1938) was a Ukrainian revolutionary and Soviet bureaucrat who held high office in the government of the Soviet Union. He served as People's Commissar for Finance in Moscow, from 1930 to 1937, replacing Nikolai Bryukhanov.

He was executed during the Great Purge in March 1938. He was rehabilitated in 1959.

== Early life and career ==
He was born on 30 November 1890 in the family of an employee in the village of Shtepivka. In 1900, he graduated from the Lebedyn elementary school, and in 1909 from the 2nd Kharkiv gymnasium.

He studied at the historical and philological faculty of Moscow (1909–1912) and Kharkiv universities (1912–1913), but did not graduate from either. In 1913 he was expelled from Kharkiv University for participating in student riots.

From October 1913 to August 1914, he was a private of the Ekaterinoslav Grenadier Regiment in Moscow, and from August to December 1914, he was on the Southwestern Front. From December 1914 to November 1917, he was a junior officer of the Ekaterinoslav Grenadier Regiment on the Western Front.

== Revolutionary activities ==
Hrynko had been a member of the Ukrainian Socialist-Revolutionary Party since 1917, belonging to its left wing. After the October Revolution Hrynko became a leader of the Ukrainian Borotbists when they split from the SRs in May 1918, then later joined the Communist Party (Bolshevik) of Ukraine when the Borotbists were dissolved by the Comintern.

He represented the Borotbists on the All-Ukrainian Central Executive Committee and the All-Ukrainian Revolutionary Committee. In September–December 1919, he was a member of the Moscow Bureau of the Ukrainian Communist Party (Borotbists). From December 1919 to February 1920, he was a member of the All-Ukrainian Revolutionary Committee in Serpukhov, Kursk, and Kharkiv.

He was a member of the RCP(b) since August 1919 or, according to other reports, since 1920. As a former member of the defunct pro-independence party, he was purged in 1922 for "nationalist deviation", but regained favour during the effort for Ukrainization and made Ukrainian Commissar of the State Planning Committee of Ukraine in 1925.

== Career as an educator ==
From December 1917 to January 1919, he was a teacher at the Kharkiv Jewish Public Gymnasium. In January–July 1919, he was the deputy head of the public education committee in the city of Kharkiv. From July to September 1919, he was a member of the collegium of the People's Commissariat of Education of the USSR. He headed the People's Commissariat of Education of the USSR from 16 February 1920 to 20 September 1922.

Hrynko's activities at the head of the People's Commissariat of Education of the Ukrainian SSR turned out to be reformist. He rejected the organizational scheme and concept of the education system that operated in Russia, proposing a seven-year comprehensive school, followed by a vocational school. On 25 March 1920, the first All-Ukrainian meeting on public education adopted the model of education proposed and substantiated by Hrynko. He was invited to Moscow for "educational work", but the People's Commissar of Education rejected accusations of separatism and did not give in to his own convictions.

At one of the first meetings of the Soviet People's Committee of the USSR on 24 February 1920, Hrynko proposed to honor the memory of Taras Shevchenko by declaring 11 March a "workers' holiday " and allocating one million rubles. He had to personally develop estimates for the maintenance of provincial departments of education, write instructions for the local nomenklatura on financing their work, and also find funds for the maintenance of higher educational institutions. Thus, on 15 March 1920, he asked the People's Commissariat of Finance to allocate 50 million rubles for the needs of the Ekaterinoslav Department of Public Education, 21 million rubles for Kharkiv Oblast, and 30 million rubles for Kremenchuk.

The conflicting statements of the People's Commissar of Education of the Ukrainian SSR regarding the prospects for the development of Ukrainian culture, his desire to please the Russian Bolsheviks, and his insistence on his own views in the field of education, testified to the difficult political situation in Ukraine in 1920, which was at the end of the civil war. Hrynko defended the administrative-territorial and functional separateness of Ukraine, implementing "spontaneous" education reform, but in the context of communist education, that is, the Bolshevik model of society.

== Bureaucratic career ==
From December 1922 to August 1923, he was the chairman of the State Planning Committee of the Ukrainian SSR ("DerzhPlan"). In 1923, the magazine The Red Way was published under the editorship of Hrynko.

From 14 August 1923 to July 1925, he was the Chairman of the Kyiv Provincial Executive Committee, and at the same time, the chairman of the Kyiv City Council. During his tenure, he sponsored administrative and territorial reforms took place, creating Kyiv District from part of the former Kyiv Governorate.

From July 1925 to December 1926, he was once again the Chairman of DerzhPlan and deputy chairman of the Council of People's Commissars of the Ukrainian SSR. He served from December 1926 to December 1929 as Deputy Chairman of State Planning Committee of the USSR ("GosPlan"). From 16 December 1929 to October 1930 he was Deputy People's Commissar of Agriculture of the USSR. From 18 October 1930 to 13 August 1937 he was People's Commissar of Finance of the USSR ("Narkomfin").

== Purge and rehabilitation ==
During 1936 and 1937, Hrynko worked actively, trying to earn the trust of Stalin, Molotov, and Kaganovich. In order to achieve a deficit-free budget, he strove to balance the revenue and expenditure parts of the state budget. On 9 January 1937, he reported to Stalin about the over-execution of the state budget, as well as about submitting his report "Budget and Defense of the USSR" to the session of the Central Committee of the USSR. In July 1937, Hrynko signed financial documents on the material and technical support of collective farms in Donetsk Oblast, which turned out to be the last in his career as the People's Commissar of the USSR.

On 22 July 1937, Vyacheslav Molotov formally fired Hrynko, and instead appointed Vlas Chubar, who on July 23 acted as an observer of the work of the Narkomfin. On 25 August 1937, Chubar reported to Stalin and Molotov that the previous leadership had led the work of the People's Commissariat to complete "collapse." In December 1937, Hryshin, the head of the staff department of the National People's Fund of the USSR, noted that the former leadership was only concerned with raising the salaries of civil servants and employees of cultural and educational institutions, and the "enemy of the people" Hrynko did not want to introduce new schemes of the People's Commissariat of Finance.

On 17 August 1937, Hrynko was arrested in the case of the so-called "anti-Soviet right-wing Trotskyist bloc". He was allegedly forced to publicly confess to his "nefarious" activities during the period of Ukrainization at Trial of the Twenty One with Christian Rakovsky and nineteen other members of the so-called Right Opposition. These were former Soviet leaders, actual or presumed political enemies of Joseph Stalin, who were charged with opposing the policies of rapid industrialization, forced collectivization, and central planning, as well as engaging in international espionage and attempted overthrow of the Soviet Union, while planning to eliminate the Soviet leadership.

He was sentenced to death and shot on 15 March 1938. He was 47 years old. On 15 July 1959, he was posthumously rehabilitated due to the absence of a crime.

== Notes ==
Political offices
Preceded by Jan Hamarnyk	Mayor of Kyiv; 1924–1925	Succeeded by Panteleimon Svystun
Preceded by Nikolai Bryukhanov	People's Commissar for Finance; 1930 – 1937	Succeeded by Vlas Chubar
