= Rakauskas =

- Lithuanian surname
- m.: Rakauskas
- f.: (unmarried): Rakauskaitė
- f.: (married): Rakauskienė
- Related names: Rakowski, Rakovsky

Rakauskas is a Lithuanized form of the Polish surname Rakowski. Notable people with the surname include:

- Aldona Rakauskienė (born 1954), Lithuanian lawyer, member of the Supreme Court of Lithuania
- Audrius Rakauskas (born 1966), Lithuanian journalist
- Daiva Rakauskaitė, Lithuanian balloonist
- Eglė Rakauskaitė (born 1967), Lithuanian artist
- Giedrė Rakauskaitė (born 1991), British Paralympic rower
- Mečys Rakauskas (1938–2020), Lithuanian writer
