= Isidore Gukovsky =

Russian revolutionary and politician (1871–1921)

Isidor Gukovsky
- Исидор Гуковский

People's Commissar for Finance of the RSFSR
- In office 21 March – 16 August 1918
- Premier: Vladimir Lenin
- Preceded by: Vyacheslav Menzhinsky
- Succeeded by: Nikolay Krestinsky

Personal details
- Born: 25 May 1871 Saint Petersburg, Russian Empire
- Died: August 16, 1921 (aged 50) Moscow, Russian Soviet Federative Socialist Republic
- Party: RSDLP (1898–1903); RSDLP (Mensheviks) (1903–1917); Russian Communist Party (Bolsheviks) (1917–1921)

Isidor Emmanuilovich Gukovsky (Russian: Исидор Эммануилович Гуковский; 25 May 1871 – 16 August 1921) was a Russian revolutionary who was a People's Commissar of Finance of the RSFSR following the Russian Revolution.

Isidor was the son of a merchant, who became a chemist's assistant. In 1898, he started participating in the Group of Workers Revolutionaries. He later became a member of the Menshevik faction of the RSDLP. He was imprisoned for inciting the Izhorskiye workers to strike. In 1904 he went to Baku, and used the name Theodor Izmaylovich for his political work. By 1906 he was secretary of the newspaper New Life. He then went to Odessa before travelling abroad. In 1907, he returned to Russia, was arrested, again brought to trial but acquitted (1908). He settled in Moscow. After the October Revolution he became a Bolshevik and was appointed finance minister where he advocated for a plan similar to the New Economic Policy, then plenipotentiary representative of Russia in Estonia. He was accused of bribery and corruption during his position as Finance Commissar but died of pneumonia in Estonia before his trial could take place.

Political offices
Preceded by Vyacheslav Menzhinsky	People's Commissar for Finance of the RSFSR; March 1918 – 16 August 1918	Succeeded by Nikolai Krestinsky
Diplomatic posts
Preceded by Nikoly Klyshko	Plenipotentiary Representative of the Soviet Union in Estonia; 1920	Succeeded by Leonid Stark
