= Vasily Garbuzov =

Soviet economist and politician

- Василий Гарбузов
- Garbuzov in 1960

Minister of Finance of the USSR
- In office 16 May 1960 – 12 November 1985
- Premier: Nikita Khrushchev (until 1964); Alexei Kosygin (until 1980); Nikolai Tikhonov (until 1985); Nikolai Ryzhkov
- Preceded by: Arseny Zverev
- Succeeded by: Boris Gostev

Personal details
- Born: 20 June 1911 Belgorod, Belgorod Oblast, Imperial Russia
- Died: 12 November 1985 (aged 74) Moscow, Union of Soviet Socialist Republics
- Party: Communist Party of the Soviet Union (1938-1985)
- Education: Kharkiv Financial and Economic Institute
- Profession: Economist

Vasily Fyodorovich Garbuzov (Russian: Василий Федорович Гарбузов; 20 June 1911 – 12 November 1985) was a Soviet economist and politician. He served as Minister of Finance from 1960 until his death in November 1985. Along with other Soviet economists such as Lev Gatovsky, Garbuzov played a role in the formulation of the 1965 Soviet Economic Reform.

== Biography ==
Vasily Garbuzov was born on 20 June 1911 in Belgorod to a Russian working-class family. In 1925 he started working as an apprentice carpenter at a sawmill in Kharkov. In 1933 he graduated from the Kharkiv Financial and Economic Institute, and in 1936 completed his post-graduate studies. After school, Garbuzov started working as a teacher, and later became the Acting Head of the Department of Political Science.

In 1938, he joined the Russian Communist Party (bolsheviks). During the Great Patriotic War his main task was evacuating areas from the approaching German Army. From 1941 onwards, he worked as a senior inspector, and later, as a deputy chief of administration in the People's Commissariat for Finance of the Kirghiz Soviet Socialist Republic. Two years later, he became a Consultant of the Secretariat of Finance of the People's Commissariat for Finance. After the war he returned to teaching, this time at the Kiev Institute of Finance and Economics. Garbuzov became of Head of the Department of Political Science, then deputy director and beginning in 1944, the Director of the Kiev Institute.

Before becoming Minister of Finance, Garbuzov was the Chairman of the State Planning Committee of the Ukrainian Soviet Socialist Republic from 1950 to 1952, and in 1952, became a deputy. In the following year, he was promoted to the First Deputy Minister of Finance. In May, he took over for Arseny Zverev as Minister of Finance, he would hold this position until his death in 1985. He was replaced by Boris Gostev in the post.

On 2 July 1981, the Presidium of the Supreme Soviet awarded Garbuzov the Hero of Socialist Labour and the Order of Lenin for his contribution to the Soviet state and his 70th anniversary of service. Garbuzov was a delegate to the 22nd, 23rd and 24th Congress of the Communist Party of the Soviet Union (CPSU). He was elected to the Central Committee of the CPSU in 1961. He was made a deputy of the Supreme Soviet of the Soviet Union for 5-9 convocations.

Vasily Garbuzov died in Moscow on 12 November 1985. A small memorial plaque has been raised on the house in which he lived before his death. He was buried in Moscow at the Novodevichy cemetery.
