= Nikolay Krestinsky =

Soviet revolutionary, politician, and diplomat (1883–1938)

- Николай Крестинский
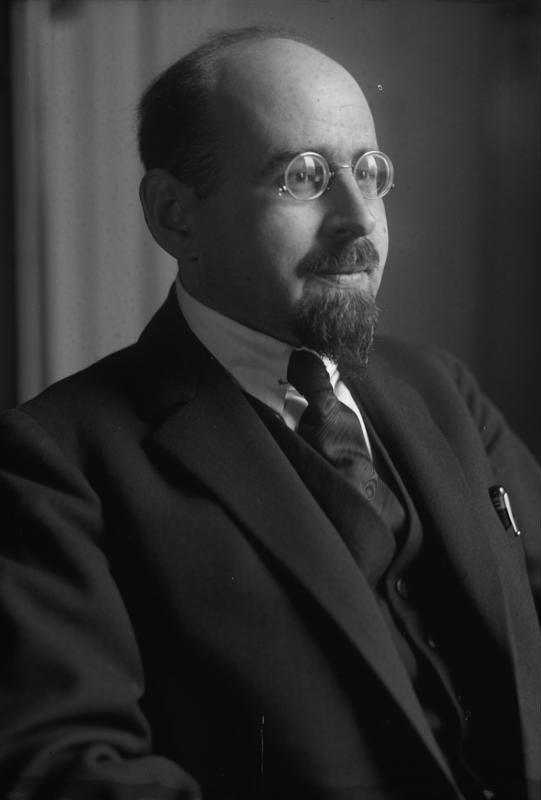
- Krestinsky in 1929

Responsible Secretary of the Russian Communist Party
- In office 29 November 1919 – 16 March 1921
- Preceded by: Elena Stasova (as Chairwoman)
- Succeeded by: Vyacheslav Molotov

People's Commissar for Finance of the Russian SFSR
- In office 16 August 1918 – 22 November 1922
- Premier: Vladimir Lenin
- Preceded by: Isidore Gukovsky
- Succeeded by: Grigory Sokolnikov

Full member of the 8th, 9th Politburo
- In office 8 March 1919 – 16 March 1921

Full member of the 8th, 9th Secretariat
- In office 8 March 1919 – 16 March 1921

Personal details
- Born: 13 October 1883 Mogilev, Russian Empire (now Belarus)
- Died: 15 March 1938 (aged 54) Moscow, Russian SFSR, Soviet Union
- Party: RSDLP (Bolsheviks) (1903-1918); Russian Communist Party (1918–1937)
- Education: Saint Petersburg State University

Nikolay Nikolayevich Krestinsky (Russian: Никола́й Никола́евич Крести́нский; 13 October 1883 – 15 March 1938) was a Soviet Bolshevik revolutionary and politician who served as the Responsible Secretary of the Communist Party of the Soviet Union.

Born in Mogilev to a Ukrainian family, Krestinsky studied law at Saint Petersburg Imperial University, where he embraced revolutionary politics. He became a member of the Russian Social Democratic Labour Party (RSDLP) in 1903, and two years later he supported Vladimir Lenin's Bolshevik faction following the RSDLP split. Repeatedly arrested, he was exiled to the Urals in 1914, shortly before the outbreak of the First World War. After the 1917 February Revolution brought an end to the monarchy, Krestinsky led the Bolsheviks in Yekaterinburg before returning to Petrograd. He was named People's Commissar for Finance and elected to the first Politburo. After the death of Yakov Sverdlov, Krestinsky also served as Responsible Secretary of the Russian Communist Party.

Krestinsky was an ally of Leon Trotsky and supported the Left Opposition. With the rise of Joseph Stalin, Krestinsky gradually fell from power and lost his positions in the government, save for his post as Soviet ambassador to Germany. He eventually repudiated his opposition and capitulated to Stalin. Krestinsky was arrested in 1937 in the Great Purge and charged with treason. He was found guilty in the 1938 Trial of the Twenty-One and executed.

== Origins ==
Krestinsky was born in the town of Mogilev, in what is now Mogilev Region of Belarus in to the family of a teacher. His family was Ukrainian. He was educated at the Vilno (Vilnius) Gymnasium and studied law at St Petersburg University. After graduating in 1907, he worked for ten years as a barrister and barrister's assistant.

== Rise ==
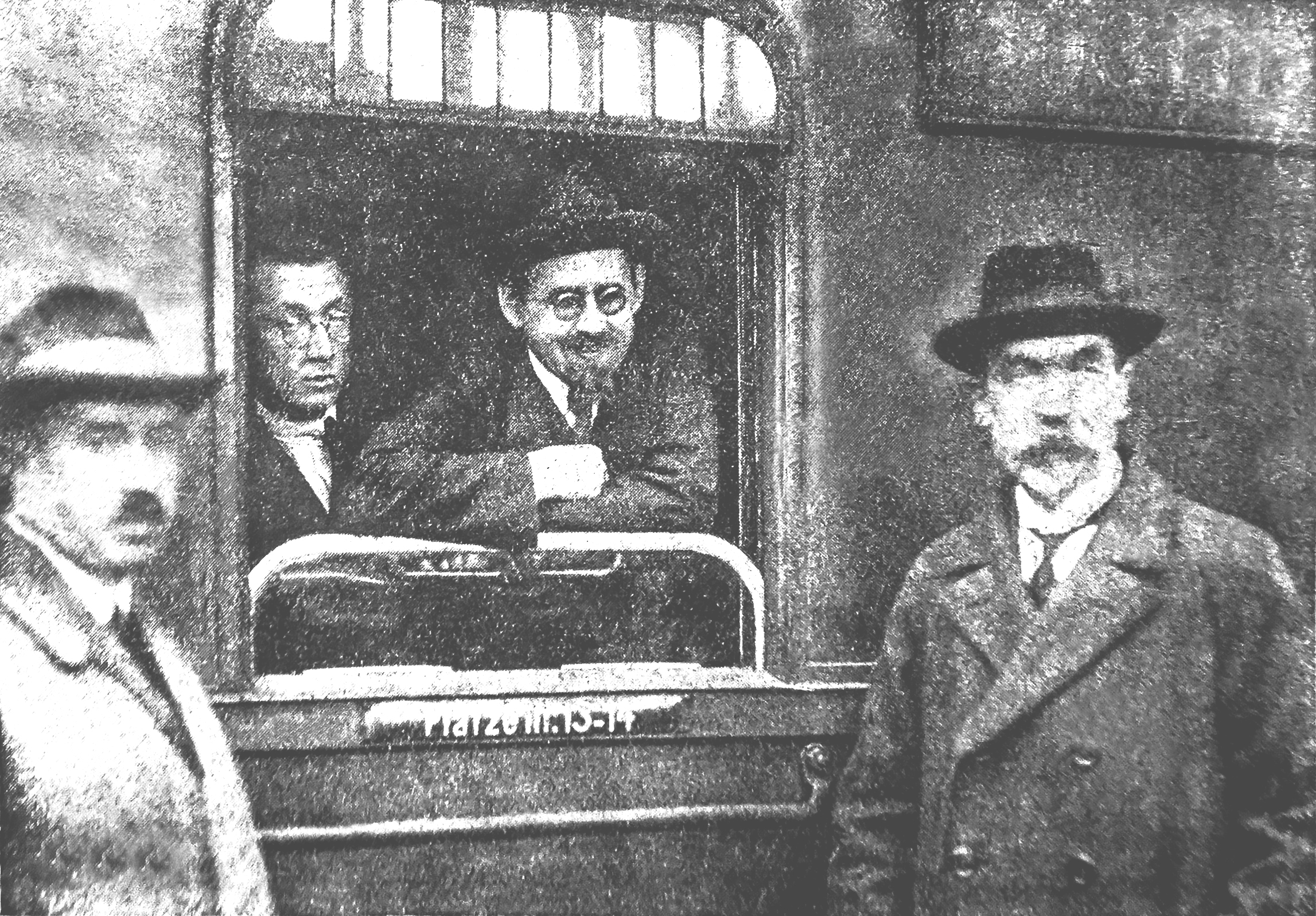
Nikolay Krestinsky, Soviet Ambassador to Germany (Jul 1923 to Sep 1930). Behind him the Deputy Trade representative Turov. Standing on the right is Voldemar Aussem who later became Plenipotentiary Representative to Austria (May to Dec 1924). Krestinsky and Aussem were repressed during the Great Purge.

Having become radicalised when he first entered university, Krestinsky joined the Russian Social Democratic Labor Party in Vilno in 1903. From 1905, he supported its Bolshevik faction, led by Vladimir Lenin. He was arrested in Vilno in 1904, then again in St Petersburg in February 1905, but was released both times, pending a trial. He was arrested again, twice, during the 1905 revolution, but released under an amnesty. In total, he was arrested nine times. On the outbreak of war in 1914, he was deported to the Urals.

After the February Revolution, which overthrew monarchy in Russia, Krestinsky was chairman of the Yekaterinburg and Urals committee of the Bolshevik party, and was elected a member of the Central Committee in July 1917. After the October Revolution, he moved to Petrograd (St Petersburg) as deputy head of the state bank. In August 1918 – 1921, he was People's Commissar for Finance.

In January 1918, during the dispute over whether to sign the Treaty of Brest-Litovsk to take Russia out of the war, Krestinsky was one of just two members of the Central Committee to vote to reject the treaty and fight a 'revolutionary war' with Germany, but in March 1918, to avoid a split that might have driven Lenin, he ended his opposition.

In March 1921, after the early death of Yakov Sverdlov, Krestinsky received a sudden promotion to the post of Secretary of the Central Committee. He was also elected a member of the original five-member Politburo, and of the first Orgburo. At first, he was the only Central Committee secretary. In 1920–21 he was the senior one of three.

== Fall from power ==
As the official responsible for party appointments, Krestinsky took a conciliatory line towards dissenters, for which he was openly attacked by Grigory Zinoviev, who was backed up by Joseph Stalin and others who later formed the Stalinist faction within the party. At the same time, Leon Trotsky was under attack from the same direction in a dispute over the role of the trade unions, in which Krestinsky backed Trotsky, against Lenin. At the end of the Tenth Party Congress he was sacked as the party's responsible secretary in April 1921, and replaced by Vyacheslav Molotov (and a year later by Stalin), and removed from the Politburo, Orgburo, and the Central Committee.

During the powers struggle that followed Lenin's death, Krestinsky supported Trotsky and the Left Opposition. He and Trotsky spent hours discussing the situation in the Soviet Union when Trotsky visited Berlin incognito for about six weeks in April–May 1926. Krestinsky told him that Stalin was "a bad man, with yellow eyes.".

But on 27 November 1927, he wrote to Trotsky saying that he no longer agreed with the programme of the Left Opposition. In April 1928, he publicly repudiated the opposition, claiming that he had never been an active member, making him one of the first Trotskyists to capitulate to Stalin.

== Diplomatic career ==
Krestinsky was Soviet ambassador in Germany from 1921 to 1930. In this capacity, he negotiated the first trade agreement with Hungary, in 1925, and the German-Soviet treaty of 1926. In 1930, he was recalled to Moscow and appointed Deputy People's Commissar for Foreign Affairs, in place of Maxim Litvinov, who had been promoted to People's Commissar. The post was an important and sensitive one because of Soviet Russia's crucial and delicate relationship with Germany at the time, but not nearly as important as his previous posts.

== Show trial and death ==
In March 1937, early in the Great Purge, Krestinsky was suddenly transferred to the post of USSR Deputy People's Commissar for Justice. He was arrested in May 1937. In prison he was beaten unconscious, and, according to a doctor who worked in Lefortovo Prison, was beaten so badly that there was not any part of his back that was not discoloured by bruises. After a 'confession' had been forced out of him, he was put on trial (as part of the Trial of the Twenty One) on 12 March 1938. While almost all of the other defendants admitted their guilt during the Moscow Trials, on the first day of the trial, 2 March, Krestinsky told the presiding judge, Vasili Ulrikh:

I do not plead guilty. I am not a Trotskyite. I was never a member of the 'bloc of Rights and Trotskyites', of whose existence I was not aware. Nor have I committed any of the crimes with which I personally am charged; in particular I -plead not guilty of having had connections with the German intelligence service.

The following day, he made a total reversal of his position:

Yesterday, under the influence of a momentary keen feeling of false shame, evoked by the atmosphere of the dock and the painful impression created by the public reading of the indictment, which was aggravated by my poor health, I could not bring myself to tell the truth, I could not bring myself to say that I was guilty. And instead of saying, "Yes, I am guilty," I almost mechanically answered, "No, I am not guilty."

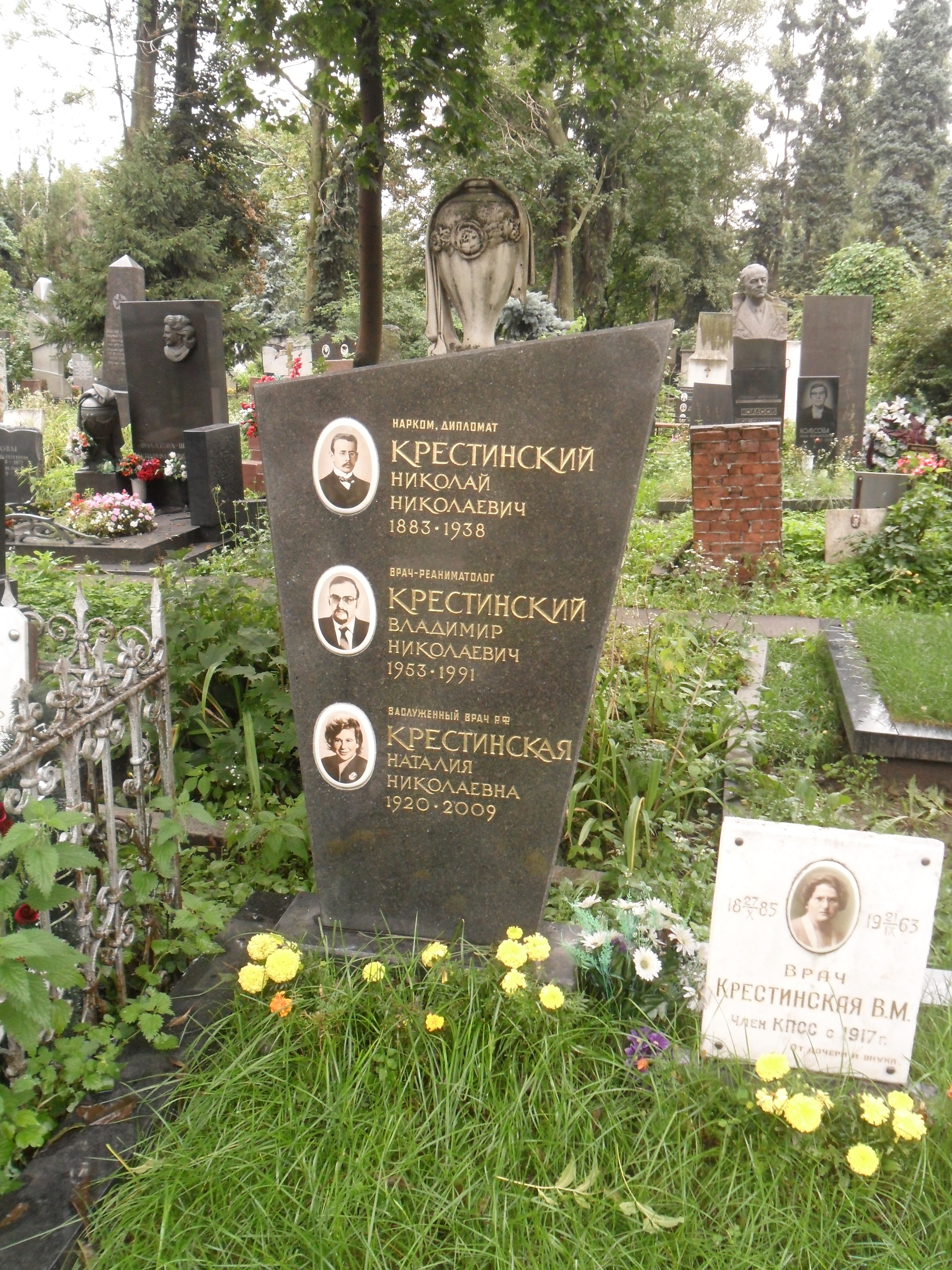
Krestinsky’s cenotaph at Novodevichy Cemetery.

Such a reversion was a rare episode in the show trials, of the late 1930s. It caused speculation that the person brought back on the second day was not Krestinsky, but someone recruited to play him, or that he had been hypnotised. He went on to 'confess' that he was a German agent, and that he had met Trotsky in the Tyrol resort of Merano in October 1933 to receive instructions on sabotage. However, Trotsky was under constant surveillance by Soviet agents at the time and KGB records from the 1950s do not mention any trip to Merano. Trotsky told the New York Herald Tribune that he had never been to the resort and had not spoken to Krestinsky since 1927.

Krestinsky was sentenced to death and executed on 15 March 1938.

He was partially exonerated during Nikita Khrushchev's destalinisation program, when, on 27 October 1963, Izvestia carried an article by the former soviet ambassador to Great Britain, Ivan Maisky, praising Krestinsky as a "diplomat of the Leninist school.". He was cleared of all charges during Mikhail Gorbachev's perestroika reforms.

== Personality ==
Joseph E. Davies, who was the US ambassador to the USSR in 1938, described Krestinsky in his memoir, Mission to Moscow as "a short-sighted little man with a rather repulsive face" – but his view must have been coloured by the fact that he accepted the confessions by defendants at the March 1938 show trial, which he attended. He told the US State Department that "if the charges are true a terrible sordid picture of human nature at its worst is being unfolded." Victor Serge, who knew him in the 1920s, wrote that:

Krestinsky was a man of outstanding intelligence, discretion and courage ... He was astoundingly myopic, so that his shrewd eyes, hidden behind lenses a quarter of an inch thick, seemed to have a timid expression. With his tall, bare skull and his wisp of dark beard, he made one think of a scholar. Actually, he was a great practical technician of Socialism.

== Family ==
Krestinsky's Jewish wife, Vera (née Yugenburg), who worked as a doctor, was arrested in February 1938, charged with being the wife of a 'traitor to the Motherland', and sentenced to 10 years in prison. Their 19-year-old daughter, Natalya, a student at a Medical Institute in Moscow, was arrested in June 1939 and exiled to Krasnoyarsk territory for three years. She was 'rehabilitated' in 1956.

Political offices
Preceded by Isidore Gukovsky	People's Commissar for Finance of the RSFSR; 16 August 1918 – October 1922	Succeeded by Grigory Sokolnikov
