= Gossnab =

Soviet state committee for industrial technology supply

State Supplies of the USSR, known as the Gossnab of USSR (Russian: Госснаб СССР) was active from 1948 to 1953, and 1965 to 1991. Its full name was the State Committee for Material and Technical Supply of the USSR. Its primary responsibility was the wholesale allocation of material and technical goods to state enterprises, a critical state function in the absence of markets.

Gossnab was one of more than twenty state committees under the Council of Ministers, the administrative arm of the Soviet government, along with other economic organs such as Gosplan (the state planning committee) and Gosbank (the state bank). Created amid a series of economic reforms implemented under Premier Alexei Kosygin in the mid-1960s, Gossnab coordinated the allocation of resources not handled by Gosplan. Gossnab had mixed success in creating a wholesale trade system, based on direct contracts between suppliers and users.

The Gossnab coordinated with the USSR State Planning Committee (Gosplan), the Ministry of Finance of the USSR and the sectoral ministries and departments of the USSR and the Union republics.

== Chairmen of the Gossnab ==
- 1947 - 1952 - Lazar Moiseevich Kaganovich
- 1952 - 1953 - Ivan Grigorievich Kabanov
- 1965 - 1976 - Veniamin Emmanuilovich Dymshits
- 1976 - 1985 - Nikolai Vasilievich Martynov
- 1985 - 1989 - Lev Alekseevich Voronin
- 1989 - 1991 - Pavel Ivanovich Mostovoy

== See also ==
- Gosplan
- Soviet-type economic planning
