= Grigory Sokolnikov =

Soviet politician

- Григорий Сокольников
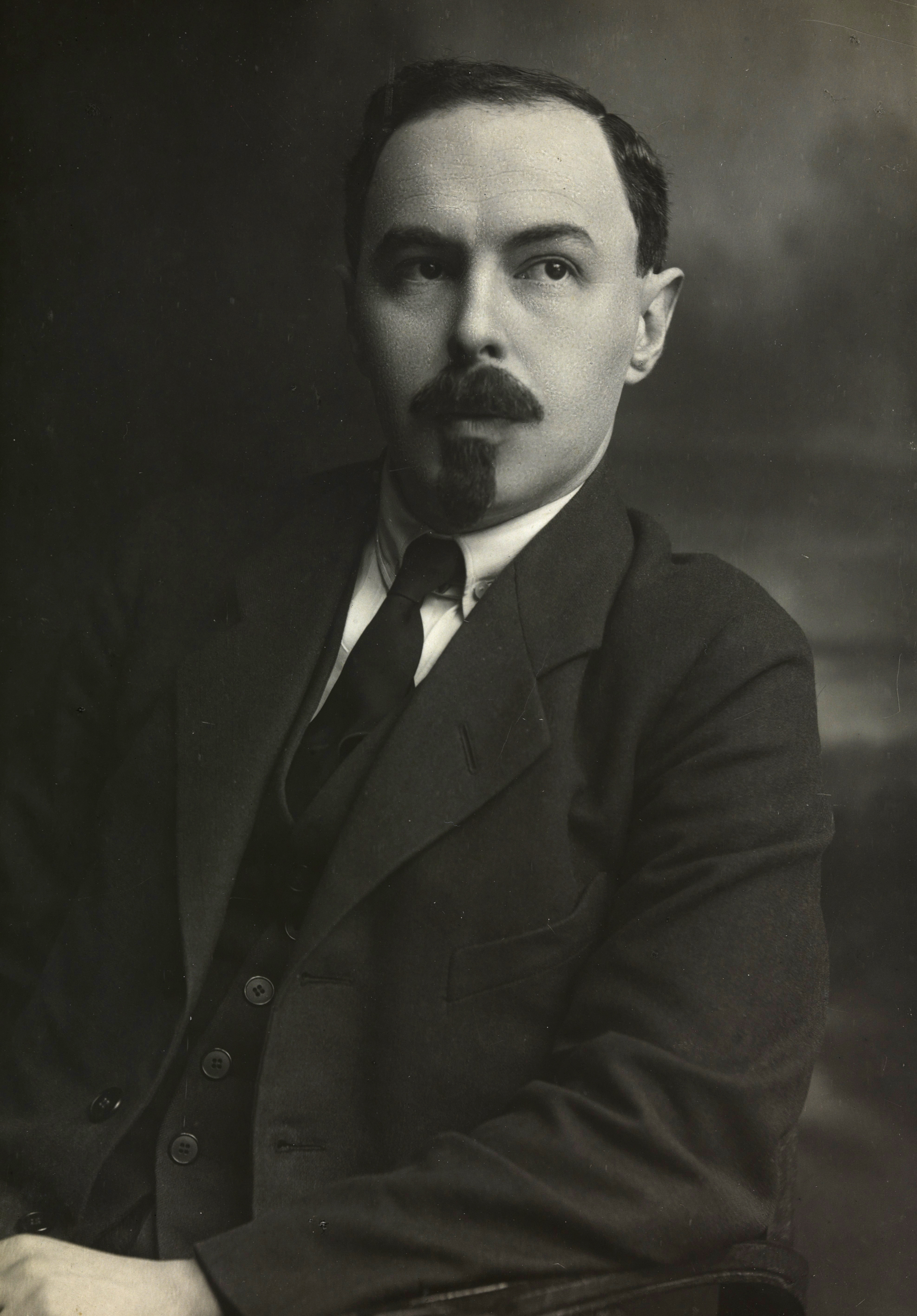
- Sokolnikov in 1923

People's Commissar for Finance of the USSR
- In office 6 July 1923 – 16 January 1926
- Premier: Vladimir Lenin (until 1924); Alexei Rykov
- Preceded by: None—post created
- Succeeded by: Nikolai Bryukhanov

People's Commissar for Finance of the RSFSR
- In office 22 November 1922 – 6 July 1923
- Premier: Vladimir Lenin
- Preceded by: Nikolay Krestinsky
- Succeeded by: Myron K. Vladimirov

Full member of the 6th, 7th Bureau
- In office 11 March – 25 March 1919
- In office 10 October 1917 – 29 July 1918

Candidate member of the 13th Politburo
- In office 2 June 1924 – 1 January 1926

Personal details
- Born: Girsh Yankelevich Brilliant; 15 August 1888 Romny, Poltava Governorate, Russian Empire
- Died: 21 May 1939 (aged 50) Verkhneuralsk, Tyumen Oblast, Soviet Union
- Party: RSDLP (Bolsheviks) (1905–1918); Russian Communist Party (1918–1936)
- Education: Saint Petersburg State University

Grigory Yakovlevich Sokolnikov (Note: Russian: Григорий Яковлевич Сокольников) (born Hirsch Yankelevich Brilliant; (Note: Russian: Гирш Я́нкелевич Бриллиа́нт) 15 August 1888 – 21 May 1939) was a Russian revolutionary, economist, and Soviet politician.

Born to a Jewish family in Romny (now in Ukraine), Sokolnikov joined the Russian Social Democratic Labour Party in 1905, and was active as a Bolshevik during the 1905 Revolution. He was exiled to Siberia from 1907 to 1909, when he escaped to Western Europe, and obtained a doctorate in economics from the Sorbonne. In 1917, Sokolnikov returned to Russia and was elected to the party's Central Committee, and following the October Revolution, oversaw the nationalisation of banks, was a member of the delegation at the negotiations for the Treaty of Brest-Litovsk, and served as political commissar during the Russian Civil War. He served as the People's Commissar for Finance from 1922 to 1926 before being demoted to lower positions due to his opposition to Stalin's rise to power. In 1936, Sokolnikov was arrested during the Great Purge, and sentenced to 10 years' imprisonment at the Moscow trials. He was later killed in prison in 1939.

== Early career ==
Grigory Sokolnikov was born Girsh Yankelevich Brilliant in Romny on 15 August 1888, the son of a Jewish doctor employed by the railways. He moved to Moscow as a teenager and became involved in revolutionary circles alongside his friend and classmate, Nikolai Bukharin. He joined the Bolshevik faction of the Russian Social Democratic Labour Party in 1905. In 1906–07, he was based in the Sokolniki district of Moscow as a Bolshevik propagandist until autumn 1907, when mass arrests crushed the district organization, and he was detained for 18 months in solitary confinement in Butyrka prison, and sentenced to lifelong exile in Siberia. Deported in February 1909, it took four months for him to reach his assigned destination, a village called Rybnoye, on the bank of the Angara River, and six weeks to escape, via Moscow to Paris. In 1914, Sokolnikov obtained a doctorate in economics from the Sorbonne. He joined the 'conciliatior' Bolsheviks, who wanted to avert an outright split with the Mensheviks. During the war, he moved to Switzerland, and contributed to the newspaper Nashe Slovo, edited by Trotsky.

In April 1917, Sokolnikov was a passenger in the famous sealed train that took Vladimir Lenin and other Bolsheviks across Germany to Russia.

== Role in 1917 ==
In April 1917, Sokolnikov was elected to the Moscow party committee. He backed Lenin's call for a second revolution. When Lenin was forced to go into hiding, in July, Sokolnikov moved to Petrograd, where he and Stalin were given joint control over Bolsheviks newspapers.

Elected to the Central Committee in August 1917, he was selected in October as a member of the 'Political Bureau', a forerunner of the Politburo, whose members were Lenin, Zinoviev, Kamenev, Trotsky, Stalin, Sokolnikov and Bubnov, but the 'bureau' never met. Trotsky wrote later that it was 'completely impractical', with Lenin and Zinoviev in hiding, and Zinoviev and Kamenev opposed to the planned Bolshevik insurrection.

== Brest-Litovsk Treaty ==
After the October Revolution, he was a member of the original delegation led by Joffe sent to Brest-Litovsk to sign a truce with Germany. When the truce broke down, and the Germans were advancing through Latvia towards Petrograd, he backed Lenin's line that the Soviet government would have to capitulate, although he saw this as a delaying tactic while they created a Red Army capable of conducting a 'revolutionary war'.

When the decision was made, on 24 February 1918, no one wanted to sign the surrender, and Sokolnikov was instructed to lead the delegation, after he had tried in vain to nominate Zinoviev instead. He signed the final treaty, angrily and under protest, on 3 March, forecasting that Germany’s expansionism would be short-lived. The German and Austrian diplomats complained that his outburst spoiled the final day of negotiations. Sokolnikov later wrote that "the division of labour in capitalist society was brilliantly expressed in this contrast of unceremonial plunder at the front and mannerly gentlemanliness at the green table".

On 10 May, Sokolnikov told a meeting of the Central Committee that the Germans could not be trusted to honour the treaty, and that it had been a mistake to sign it. It required a fierce rebuttal from Lenin to avert the threat of resuming the war. Despite his intervention, in June 1918, Sokolnikov led a delegation to Berlin to negotiate a trade treaty with Germany, but the talks were aborted after the assassination of the German ambassador in Moscow, Wilhelm von Mirbach in July.

== Role in the Civil War ==
After his return from Brest, late in 1917, Sokolnikov supervised the seizure of Russian banks, and the creation of new centralised banking system. In March 1918, he was appointed an editor of Pravda, but he spent almost the entire Russian Civil War on the front line, firstly as Political commissar with the Second Army, which was responsible for putting down anti-Bolshevik rebellions on the western side of the Ural mountains, around Vyatka and Izhevsk. Two months later, after the rebellion had been crushed, he was transferred to the Southern Front, as commissar for the Ninth Army and later the Thirteenth Army, for the campaign against the Don Cossacks who had been rebelled against Bolshevik rule, and the White Army of General Denikin. Later, alongside Rosalia Zemlyachka, he became commissar of the Eighth army, using this position to order mass shootings during the Russian Civil War. He was also, for a time, military commander of the Eighth Army, despite a protest from Stalin's ally Sergo Ordzhonikidze, who wrote to Lenin demanding:"Where did the idea come from that Sokolnikov could command an army? ... Is it to protect Sokolnikov's pride that he has been allowed to play with a whole army?"

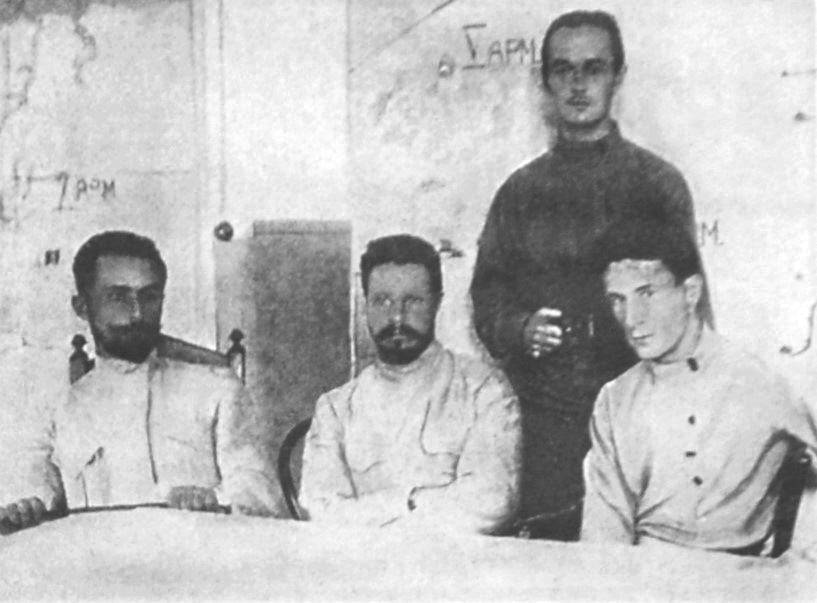
Grigori Sokolnikov, Mikhail Frunze and Valerian Kuybyshev head the Turkestan front. The image taken during Aug 1920 Red Army troops offensive against the city of Bukhara.

In August 1920, Sokolnikov was posted to Central Asia as chairman of the government of Turkestan and commander of the Turkestan Front. He led the suppression of the Basmachi rebellion. He also oversaw the introduction of a new currency, the introduction of tax in place of appropriation of surplus produce, the return of free trade, the return of land to Kirghiz that had been seized by Russian settlers, and the revival of cotton production.

== Commissar for Finance ==
Sokolnikov was appointed USSR Deputy People's Commissar of Finance on 10 January 1922. Since the People's Commissar, Nikolai Krestinsky had been appointed Ambassador to Germany, he was in fact in charge of Narkomfin from that time. In March 1922, he was re-elected to the Central Committee (from which he had been dropped in 1920) and in the autumn he was formally appointed as People's Commissar. This role made him central to the introduction of the New Economic Policy (NEP). More than anyone else, he is credited with introducing a stable currency to end the economic chaos of the civil war years. He proposed the introduction of a new currency in the month when he first took office. The 'gold bank notes' or chervontsi were issued by the state bank in November 1922.

During 1922, Sokolnikov argued persistently in favour of relaxing the state monopoly on foreign trade, to allow some of the private enterprises that came into existence under NEP to import equipment sell their produce abroad without going through government agencies. He was supported by Stalin, Zinoviev, Kamenev and Nikolai Bukharin – i.e. by a majority of the Politburo – but met vehement opposition from Lenin, who warned: "Sokolnikov is making a great mistake, which is sure to ruin us, unless the C.C. corrects his line in time, and actually secures implementation of the corrected line. His mistake is abstract enthusiasm for a scheme (something of which Sokolnikov has always been guilty, as a talented journalist and a politician who is easily carried away)." In October 1922, Sokolnikov persuaded the Central Committee to agree to partially lift the monopoly, provoking an angry reaction from Lenin, who missed the meeting through illness. He accused Sokolnikov of being someone who "likes paradoxes". The Central Committee backed down in December, after Trotsky – who also missed the October meeting – had backed Lenin.

Speaking to the 11th Congress of the CPSU in March 1922, Sokolnikov flatly contradicted those who suggested that the state should print more paper money to finance the revival of war-damaged industry, likening it to poisoning the system by injecting opium. More controversially, he warned that many factories were losing money and living off the state, and would have to pay their way by selling products in the new free market conditions of NEP.

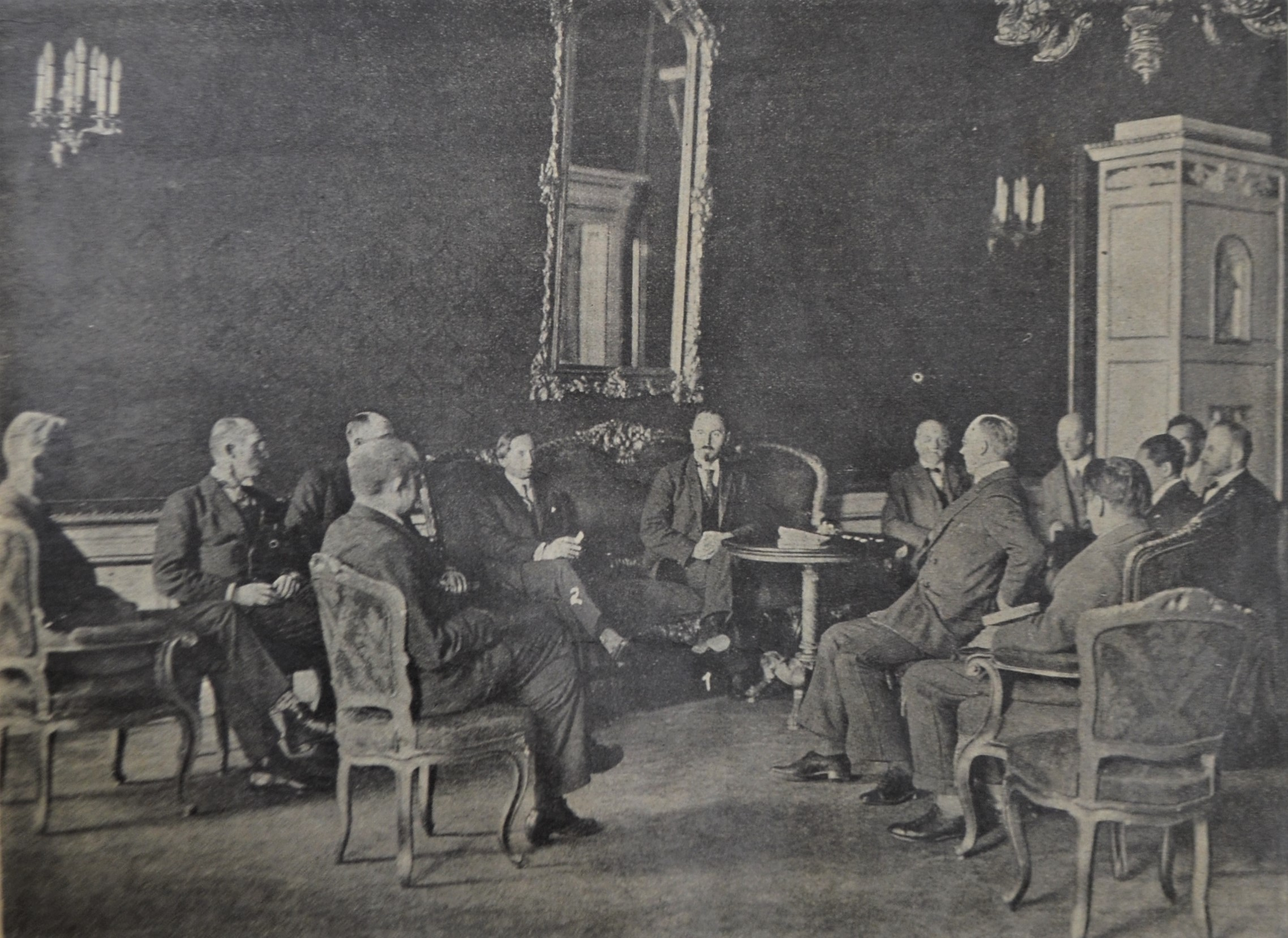
Grigori Sokolnikov, People's Commissar for Finance of the USSR, marked (1) negotiates in Berlin Sep 1923

He became a candidate member of the Politburo of the Communist Party in May 1924. According to Boris Bajanov, as minister of finance Sokolnikov proved himself to be a capable administrator, accomplishing every task he was asked to do, such as creating the first stable Soviet currency. Bajanov also notes that despite Sokolnikov's past in the Red Army, he was not ruthless in his personality. Privately, Sokolnikov lost faith in the Soviet Union under Stalin and later described the Soviet economy as state capitalist.

== Family ==
In 1925, Sokolnikov married the writer Galina Serebryakova. They had a daughter, Geliana, born in 1934.

== Opposition to Stalin ==
On 5 September 1925, Sokolnikov signed the unpublished 'Platform of the Four', a joint protest by Zinoviev, Kamenev, and Lenin's widow, Nadezhda Krupskaya against Stalin's leadership. His decision seems to have been more personal than political, because politically he was on the right of the party, whereas Zinoviev and Kamenev were about to join Trotsky in the United Opposition. He appears to have been motivated by mistrust of Stalin, and friendship with Kamenev.

Even while publicly aligned with the opposition, he continued to argue that agricultural output had to be increased before industry could be expanded, and that consumer goods should be imported to give the peasants an incentive to take their produce to market. He was also openly dismissive of the figures produced by Gosplan, believing that 'state capitalism' properly managed would be more efficient that a centrally planned economy.

According to historian, Hiroaki Kuromiya, Stalin pleaded with Sokolnikov, not to discuss Lenin’s testament at the 15th party Congress.

On January 16, 1926, Sokolnikov was removed as People’s Commissar for finance as part of a campaign to disempower the Zinoviev Opposition and transferred to Gosplan, where he was a vice chairman. After reaffirming his willingness to support the party line, he was allowed to retain his membership of the Central Committee, however. In the same month, he was removed from the post of People's Commissar for finance, and appointed Deputy Chairman of Gosplan. In spring 1926, he was sent on a trade mission to the US, which aborted when he was denied a visa.

In March 1928, when the Central Committee discussed the food crisis – to which Stalin reacted later in the year by sending shock troops into the villages to collect grain by force – Sokolnikov made a speech in which, while admitting that he had been wrong in the past, he stuck to his earlier beliefs by arguing that the way to get peasants to sell their produce was to raise the price of grain. However, after the introduction of the First five-year plan, he defended the principle that it was possible and necessary for the state to intervene and plan economic output. He wrote:

"The history of recent decades shows that even in countries where the principle of private property dominates, unlimited competition of private enterprises is steadily receding before the advance of gigantic financial and industrial corporations which ... actually plan production and marketing within the limits of certain branches, often carrying their operations across national frontiers ... A policy of non-interference by the state in such conditions would mean paralysis of state power."

In July 1928, Sokolnikov and Bukharin were returning to the Kremlin from a Central Committee plenum when they encountered Kamenev, and Bukharin talked indiscreetly about the gathering opposition to Stalin within the Politburo. In February 1929, Sokolnikov was formally rebuked by the Politburo for being present during this conversation, after a transcript had been published abroad. He was removed from his post in Gosplan. From 1929 to 1932, Sokolnikov was the Soviet ambassador to the United Kingdom, where the newly elected Labour government had extended diplomatic recognition to the USSR. Speaking very little English, he had limited contacts with leading British politicians. Beatrice Webb who invited Sokolnikov and his wife to her home and introduced him to the Chancellor of the Exchequer Philip Snowden noted in her diary: “We are the only ‘Cabinet’ members who have consorted with them. The Hendersons do not ‘know them’ socially, nor the PM."

In 1932, Sokolnikov was recalled to Moscow (and replaced by Ivan Maisky, who spoke fluent English) and appointed Deputy People's Commissar for Foreign Affairs.

== Arrest and execution ==
The British journalist Malcolm Muggeridge, who had met Sokolnikov in the United Kingdom, visited his Moscow flat just before the start of the Great Purge. He wrote later:

There had been rumours of his arrest. The poor fellow looked very nervous and shifty, and there was a noticeable greenish tinge in his sallow face. He kept glancing anxiously over his shoulder as though at some invisible intruder. With one of the most mirthless smiles I have ever seen, he remarked over tea that, if the capitalist press was to be believed, he was languishing in Lubyanka Prison. Did he look like it? He asked, getting his teeth into a chocolate eclair. Alas, he did, and I was not surprised to hear, in due course, that he had been liquidated.

Sokolnikov was arrested on 26 July 1936. He was sufficiently broken under interrogation, either through torture or more probably through threats to harm his young wife and daughter, that he not only incriminated himself, but was made to confront Bukharin, in Lazar Kaganovich's office, and accuse him of being part of a conspiracy to restore capitalism in the USSR. Bukharin shouted at him "Have you lost your reason?" – but Sokolnikov, whose face was "pale but not tortured" stuck to his story. In January 1937, he was a defendant at the Trial of the Seventeen at which he 'confessed' that he had been party to a terrorist plot against Stalin since 1932, and that Trotsky was conspiring with Adolf Hitler's deputy Rudolf Hess to incite a Nazi invasion of the USSR. He was sentenced to ten years in the Gulag. Even at the time, there were Soviet citizens who were not taken in by the trial and the forced confessions, such as the writer Isaac Babel, who was reported to the NKVD for saying, in private conversation with the film director Sergei Eisenstein "Lenin was very fond of Sokolnikov because he's a very smart man...and his whole struggle is the struggle against Stalin's influence."

Reportedly, Sokolnikov was assassinated in a prison by other convicts on 21 May 1939. A post-Stalin official investigation during the Khrushchev Thaw revealed that the murder was organized by the NKVD official P.N. Kutbatkin and ordered by Lavrentiy Beria and Joseph Stalin personally. He was rehabilitated on June 12, 1988.

== See also ==
- Outline of the Russian Revolution and Civil War
- Bibliography of the Russian Revolution and Civil War
- Bibliography of Stalinism and the Soviet Union
- Index of Old Bolsheviks
- Index of articles related to the Russian Revolution and Civil War

== Notes ==
Political offices
Preceded by Nikolai Krestinsky	People's Commissar for Finance; 1922–1926	Succeeded by Nikolai Bryukhanov
