= Veniamin Dymshits =

Soviet state and party leader (1910–1993)

- Вениамин Дымшиц

Deputy Chairman of the Council of Ministers of the Soviet Union
- In office July 17, 1962 – December 20, 1985
- Prime Minister: Nikita Khrushchev; Alexei Kosygin; Nikolai Tikhonov; Nikolai Ryzhkov
- Succeeded by: Gennady Vedernikov

Head of the Capital Construction Department of the State Planning Committee of the Soviet Union Minister of the Soviet Union
- In office June 9, 1959 – April 25, 1962
- Prime Minister: Nikita Khrushchev

First Deputy Chairman of the State Planning Committee of the Soviet Union Minister of the Soviet Union
- In office April 25, 1962 – July 17, 1962
- Prime Minister: Nikita Khrushchev

18th Chairman of the State Planning Committee of the Council of Ministers of the Soviet Union
- In office July 17, 1962 – November 24, 1962
- Prime Minister: Nikita Khrushchev
- Preceded by: Vladimir Novikov
- Succeeded by: Peter Lomako

1st Chairman of the Council of the National Economy of the Soviet Union
- In office November 24, 1962 – October 2, 1965
- Prime Minister: Nikita Khrushchev; Alexei Kosygin
- Preceded by: Office established
- Succeeded by: Office abolished

1st Chairman of the State Committee of the Council of Ministers of the Soviet Union for Material and Technical Supply
- In office October 2, 1965 – June 25, 1976
- Prime Minister: Alexei Kosygin
- Preceded by: Office established
- Succeeded by: Nikolai Martynov

Personal details
- Born: September 28, 1910 Feodosia, Taurida Governorate, Russian Empire
- Died: May 23, 1993 (aged 82) Moscow, Russian Federation
- Resting place: Novodevichy Cemetery
- Party: Communist Party of the Soviet Union (1937–1986)
- Education: Moscow Autogenous Welding Institute; Nikolai Bauman Moscow Higher Technical School
- Profession: Welding engineer
- Awards: Hero of Socialist Labour; Order of Lenin; Order of the Red Banner of Labour; Stalin Prize Medals: Medal "For Valiant Labour in the Great Patriotic War of 1941–1945"; Medal "In Commemoration of the 100th Anniversary of the Birth of Vladimir Ilyich Lenin"

Veniamin Emmanuilovich Dymshits (alternatively named Benjamin Dymshitz from February 15, 1910 – May 23, 1993) was a Soviet state and party leader and a Hero of Socialist Labor recipient.

Dymshits was a member of the Central Committee of the Communist Party of the Soviet Union (1961–1986), and Deputy of the Council of the Union of the Supreme Soviet of the Soviet Union of 6–11 Convocations from the Khabarovsk Krai.

== Biography ==
Dymshits was born into a tradesman's family on September 28, 1910, in Feodosia (now Crimea). He was the grandson of the Galacian Hebrew writer Abraham–Aba Rakovsky (1854–1921), a journalist and fiction author.

Dymshits:

- In 1927, was a worker in Donbass;
- In 1928, was a worker at enterprises of Moscow;
- From 1929–1931, was a student of the Moscow Autogenous Welding Institute, later transformed into the Welding Department of the Moscow Higher Technical School named after Nikolai Bauman;
- In 1931, was a work manager, engineer, production manager, and deputy work manager of the Kuznetskstroy Welding Office;
- In 1932, was the director of the Ural Regional Welding Office;
- In 1933, was the Head of the Department of Engineering Structures for Construction at Azovstal in Mariupol;
- In 1934, studied, while abroad, at the Mechanical Faculty of the Donetsk Institute of Business Executives, but did not graduate;
- In 1937, was the director of a metalwork plant at the construction site of the Azovstal Metallurgical Plant, and Head of Construction at the Krivoy Rog Metallurgical Plant;
- In 1939–1946, was the manager of the Magnitostroy Trust, during the Great Patriotic War.
- In 1945, graduated from the Moscow Higher Technical School Named After Nikolai Bauman as an external student;
- In 1946–1950, was the manager of the Zaporozhstroy Trust;
- In 1950, Deputy Minister of Construction of Heavy Industry Enterprises of the Soviet Union;
- In 1954–1957, Deputy Minister of Construction of Metallurgical and Chemical Industry Enterprises of the Soviet Union;
- In 1957–1959, Chief Construction Engineer of the Bhilai Metallurgical Plant in India;
- From June 9, 1959 to April 25, 1962, was Head of the Capital Construction Department of the State Planning Committee of the Soviet Union, a Minister of the Soviet Union;
- From April 25, 1962 to July 17, 1962 was First Deputy Chairman of the State Planning Committee of the Soviet Union a Minister of the Soviet Union;
- In July 17, 1962, was Deputy Chairman of the Council of Ministers of the Soviet Union, and a Chairman of the State Planning Committee of the Soviet Union (July – November 1962);
- From 1962–1965, was Chairman of the Council of the National Economy of the Soviet Union
- From 1965–1976, Chairman of the State Committee of the Council of Ministers of the Soviet Union for Material and Technical Supply.

On March 4, 1970, Veniamin Dymshits was the main figure at a press conference of Jewish citizens of the Soviet Union, where he defended Soviet policies towards Jews and was against the policies of the State of Israel.

Veniamin Dymshits made a significant contribution to the foundation of the industrialization of the Soviet Union. The following are places of some of the construction projects of metallurgical plants he participated and/or headed: Azovstal, Kuznetsk, Krivoy Rog, Magnitogorsk, Zaporozhye, Bhilai (India) and many others.

In December 20, 1985, he became a personal pensioner of union significance.

Dumshits died on May 23, 1993. He was buried in Moscow at the Novodevichy Cemetery in lot No. 10).

== Awards and prizes ==
- Hero of Socialist Labour;
- Seven Orders of Lenin;
- Two Orders of the Red Banner of Labour;
- Medals;
- Stalin Prize of the Second Degree (1946) – for the development of new methods of high–speed construction and installation of blast furnaces, carried out at the Chusovsky and Magnitogorsk Metallurgical Plants;
- Stalin Prize of the Third Degree (1950) – for the development and implementation of technological rules in housing and industrial construction.

== Sources ==
- Dymshits Veniamin Emmanuilovich in the Great Soviet Encyclopedia (in Russian) – via Great Scientific Library
- Veniamin Dymshits. Magnitka in a Soldier's Overcoat / Moscow: Architecture, 1995
- Veniamin Dymshits. Builder's Notes / Moscow: Architecture, 2001
- Boris Shmyrov. Dymshits Veniamin Emmanuilovich. Stages of a Long Journey – Chelyabinsk: ABRIS, 2015 – 112 Pages. (By Fate They Are Connected with the Urals). ISBN 978-5-91744-113-9
- Dymshits, Veniamin Emmanuilovich // Encyclopedia of Modern Ukraine: in 30 Volumes (Ukrainian) / National Academy of Sciences of Ukraine, Shevchenko Scientific Society, Institute of Encyclopedic Research of the National Academy of Sciences of Ukraine – Kyiv, Since 2001 – Volume 7: Вод – Гн ISBN 978-966-02-3355-3
- Dimshits Veniamin Emmanuilovich // Encyclopedia of the History of Ukraine: in 10 Volumes (Ukrainian) / Editorial Board: Valery Smoliy (chairman) and Others; Institute of History of Ukraine of the National Academy of Sciences of Ukraine – Kyiv: Scientific Opinion, 2004 – Volume 2: G – D – 518 Pages: Illustrations – ISBN 966-00-0405-2
