= Arseny Zverev =

Soviet Union politician (1900–1969)

- Арсений Зверев
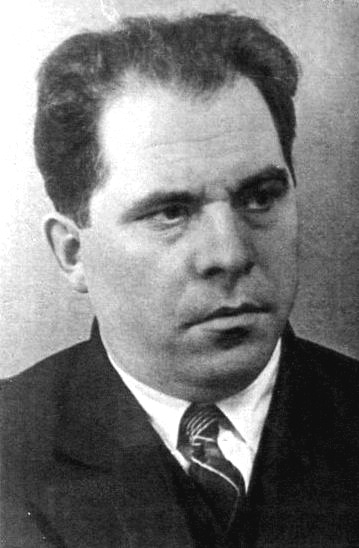
- Zverev in 1938

Minister of Finance
- In office 19 January 1938 – 16 February 1948
- Premier: Joseph Stalin
- Preceded by: Vlas Chubar
- Succeeded by: Alexei Kosygin
- In office 28 December 1948 – 16 May 1960
- Premier: Joseph Stalin (until 1953); Georgy Malenkov (until 1955); Nikolai Bulganin (until 1958); Nikita Khrushchev
- Preceded by: Alexei Kosygin
- Succeeded by: Vasily Garbuzov

Candidate member of the 19th Presidium
- In office 16 October 1952 – 6 March 1953

Personal details
- Born: 2 March 1900 Tikhomirovo, Klinsky Uyezd, Moscow Governorate, Russian Empire
- Died: 27 July 1969 (aged 69) Moscow, Soviet Union
- Party: CPSU (1919–1969)
- Education: Moscow Institute of Finance
- Profession: Economist

Arseny Grigoryevich Zverev (Russian: Арсе́ний Григо́рьевич Зве́рев; 2 March 1900 – 27 July 1969) was a Soviet and Russian politician, economist and statesman whose career spanned the rules of Joseph Stalin and Nikita Khrushchev, but culminated during the Stalin years. Zverev was born in a little village just outside Moscow. After years in local politics, he rose to prominence as a Deputy Commissar of Finance, but he also held other lesser posts such as a member of the Supreme Soviet of the Soviet Union.

As Deputy Commissar of Finance he was able to work up, and eventually get promoted to People's Commissar for Finance (renamed to Ministry in 1946). Later, Zverev gained a seat in both the Central Committee and the Presidium. During the Great Patriotic War he was responsible for providing funds for the Soviet military machine to fight the Germans. After the war he lost his Ministership, but was again made Minister of Finance late in 1948. He was replaced as Minister of Finance by Vasily Garbuzov in 1960. Zverev then held the office of Deputy of the Supreme Soviet of the Soviet Union for four convocations. He died in July 1969.

== Early life and career ==
Zverev was born in Tikhomirovo Klin, Klinsky Uyezd, Moscow Oblast to a working-class family. Before attending university, Zverev worked from 1913 to 1919 at two factories, the first being Vysokovsky manufactory located in Moscow Oblast and Trekhgorny factory in the city of Moscow. By 1919 he had joined both the All-Union Communist Party (bolsheviks) (VKP(b)) and the Red Army to fight in the Russian Civil War. He became a platoon commander over a cavalry regiment before the demobilization of the army in 1922. In 1922, he became the head of the local Agitation and Propaganda Department, and two years later, an agent of the provincial Financial Department of Moscow. He did however continue his work as an industrial worker for a short-period of time, before leaving for good. In 1927 he became chairman of the executive committee of Klin, and later in 1929, Head of Tax Administration of the Financial Department of Smolensk Oblast. The following year he also became the Head of the Financial Department of Bryansk Oblast. From 1931 to 1932 he attended the Moscow Institute of Finance and Economics and from 1936 to 1937 a District Council Chairman in Moscow. In 1937 he became the First Secretary of the Molotov District Committee of the RCP(b) of Moscow. Zverev graduated and got his degree from the Moscow Institute of Finance in 1949. Zverev was born in Tikhomirovo Klin, Klinsky Uyezd, Moscow Oblast to a working-class family. Before attending university, Zverev worked from 1913 to 1919 at two factories, the first being Vysokovsky manufactory located in Moscow Oblast and Trekhgorny factory in the city of Moscow. By 1919 he had joined both the All-Union Communist Party (bolsheviks) (VKP(b)) and the Red Army to fight in the Russian Civil War. He became a platoon commander over a cavalry regiment before the demobilization of the army in 1922. In 1922, he became the head of the local Agitation and Propaganda Department, and two years later, an agent of the provincial Financial Department of Moscow. He did however continue his work as an industrial worker for a short-period of time, before leaving for good. In 1927 he became Chairman of the Executive Committee of Klin, and later in 1929, Head of Tax Administration of the Financial Department of Smolensk Oblast. The following year he also became the Head of the Financial Department of Bryansk Oblast. From 1931 to 1932 he attended the Moscow Institute of Finance and Economics and from 1936 to 1937 a District Council Chairman in Moscow. In 1937 he became the First Secretary of the Molotov District Committee of the RCP(b) of Moscow. Zverev graduated and got his degree from the Moscow Institute of Finance in 1949.

== Minister of Finance (1938–1960) ==
Due to mass arrests perpetrated by the Soviet state in the 1930s, known as the Great Purge, Zverev along with many others were quickly promoted to the top of Soviet bureaucracy. He was a member of the Supreme Soviet of the Soviet Union from 1937 to 1950 and again from 1954 to 1962. In the meantime he held a range of offices in government, the first being the position of Deputy Commissar for Finance in September 1937 but was again quickly promoted, this time to the office of the People's Commissar for Finance, the head of Soviet finance. Zverev was given a seat in the Central Committee in 1939. During the Great Patriotic War, Zverev was responsible for providing the necessary funds for the Soviet military for the production of new equipment. During the war, the price for goods also increased. In 1948, from February to December that same year, he was downgraded to Deputy Minister of Finance. He got his old office back in December 1948 and in October 1952 became a member of the Presidium of the Central Committee. He lost his seat following Stalin's death in 1953.

== Later years and death ==
Following his departure from the office of Minister of Finance, he became Deputy of the Supreme Soviet of the Soviet Union on 1-2 and 4-5 convocations before leaving politics for good. In 1961 he became a professor of the All-Union Correspondence of Financial Institution. Zverev died in Moscow on 27 July 1969. He was buried at Novodevichy Cemetery in Moscow.

Political offices
Preceded by Alexei Kosygin	Minister of Finance; 28 December 1948-16 May 1960	Succeeded by Vasily Garbuzov
Preceded by Vlas Chubar	Minister of Finance; 19 January 1938–16 February 1948	Succeeded by Alexei Kosygin
