= Vyacheslav Menzhinsky =

Soviet politician (1874–1934)

- Вячеслав Менжинский
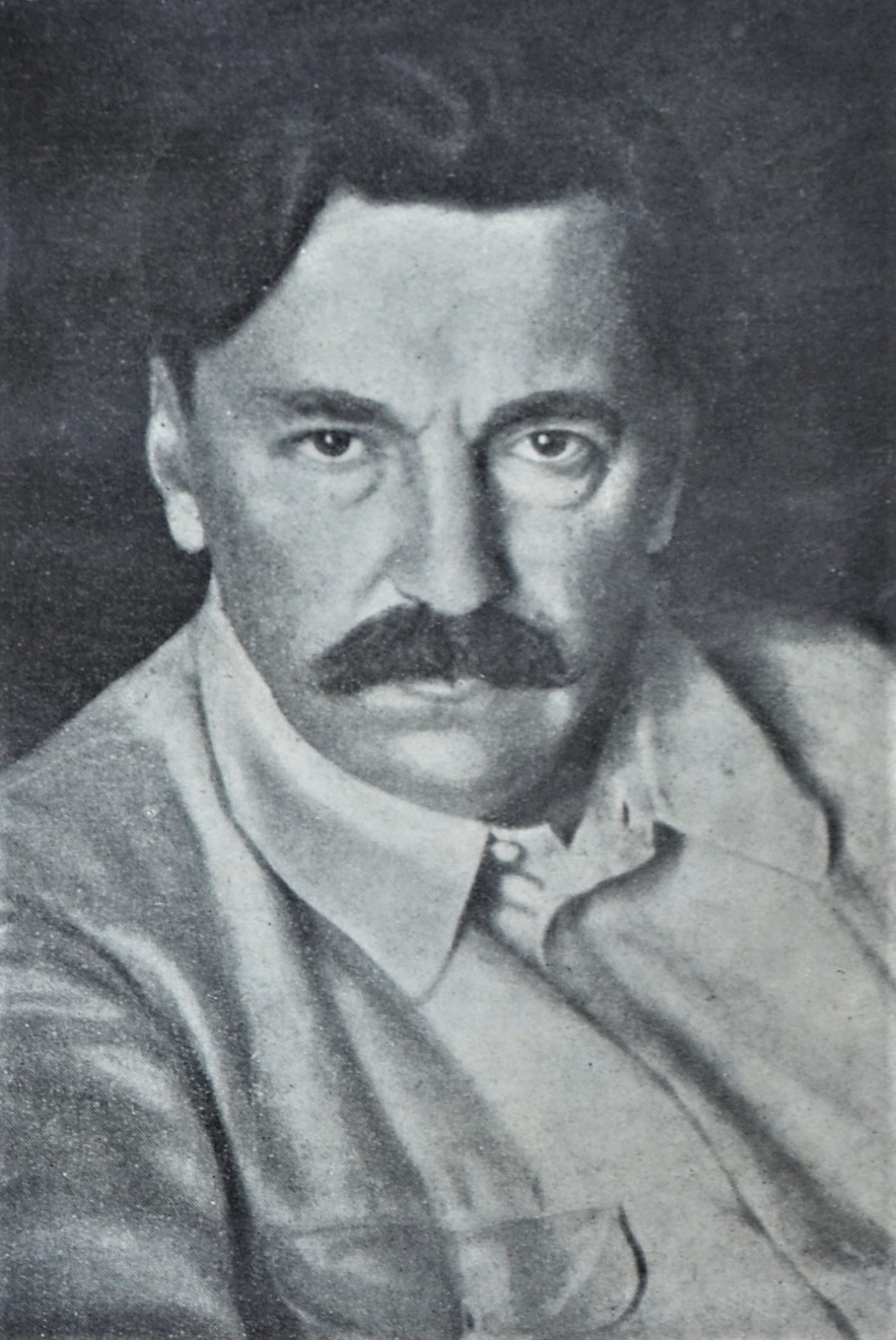
- Menzhinsky in 1926

Chairman of the OGPU
- In office 30 July 1926 – 10 May 1934
- Premier: Alexei Rykov; Vyacheslav Molotov
- Preceded by: Felix Dzerzhinsky
- Succeeded by: Genrikh Yagoda

People's Commissar for Finance of the RSFSR
- In office 30 October 1917 – 21 March 1918
- Premier: Vladimir Lenin
- Preceded by: Ivan Skvortsov-Stepanov
- Succeeded by: Isidore Gukovsky

Personal details
- Born: Wiesław Rudolfowicz Mężyński; 31 August 1874 Saint Petersburg, Russian Empire
- Died: 10 May 1934 (aged 59) Moscow, Russian SFSR, Soviet Union
- Resting place: Kremlin Wall Necropolis, Moscow
- Party: All-Union Communist Party (Bolsheviks) (1918–1934)
- Other political affiliations: RSDLP (1902–1903); RSDLP (Bolsheviks) (1903–1918)
- Education: Saint Petersburg State University

Vyacheslav Rudolfovich Menzhinsky (Russian: Вячесла́в Рудо́льфович Менжи́нский, Polish: Wiesław Rudolfowicz Mężyński; 31 August [O.S. 19 August] 1874 – 10 May 1934) was a Soviet revolutionary and politician who served as chairman of the OGPU, the secret police of the Soviet Union, from 1926 to 1934.

Born to Polish parents in Saint Petersburg, Menzhinsky joined the Russian Social Democratic Labour Party in 1902. He emigrated from Russia in 1907, and spent the next decade in Europe and the United States. After the 1917 February Revolution, he joined the Cheka in 1919, and in 1923 was promoted to its deputy under Felix Dzerzhinsky. After his death in 1926, Menzhinsky became head of the Cheka's successor, the OGPU. He worked to crush resistance in the countryside during Joseph Stalin's forced agricultural collectivization.

== Early life ==
Vyacheslav Menzhinsky, a member of the Polish nobility, was born into an Orthodox Christian Polish-Russian family of teachers. His father was a Russified Pole and a history lecturer. His mother was a woman of letters who sympathised with the revolutionaries. His brother was a tsarist official, working for the Ministry of Finance. He graduated from the Faculty of Law at Saint Petersburg University in 1898, and practised law in Yaroslavl, while dabbling in literature. He had a novel published in 1905. In February 1905, his young daughter died of a cerebral haemorrhage. The trauma ended his ten-year marriage, and he left Yaroslavl to join his unmarried sisters, Vera and Ludmila, who shared an apartment that was a popular meeting place for revolutionaries.

== Political activism ==
Menzhinsky had joined the Russian Social Democratic Labour Party (RSDLP) in 1902. During the 1905 revolution, Vera Menzhinsky worked alongside Nadezhda Krupskaya, Vladimir Lenin's wife, who was secretary of the Bolshevik faction of the RSDLP, while her brother joined the Bolshevik military organisation, until he was caught in a police raid in July 1906. He was released after two weeks in prison, after going on hunger strike, and emigrated. He lived in Belgium, Switzerland, France, United States, working in foreign branches of the RSDLP. When the Bolshevik faction split over the issue of whether to put up candidates for election to the Duma. Menzhinsky joined the "boycottists", led by Lenin's rival, Alexander Bogdanov, and joined the editorial board of their journal Vpered, but when the Vpered faction split, Menzhinsky aligned himself with the self-proclaimed "Orthodox Marxists", Grigory Aleksinsky and Mikhail Pokrovsky, rejecting the concept of proletarian culture developed by Alexander Bogdanov and Anatoly Lunacharsky. Writing in the Russian emigre journal, Our Echo in July 1910, Menzhinsky wrote:

Lenin is a political Jesuit who over the course of many years has moulded Marxism to the aims of the moment ... Lenin, this illegitimate child of Russian absolutism, considers himself not only the natural successor to the Russian throne, when it becomes vacant, but also the sole heir of the Socialist International. Should he ever come to power, the mischief he would do would not be much less than that of Paul I. The Leninists are not even a faction, but a clan of party gypsies who swing their whips so affectionately and hope to drown the voice of the proletariat with their screams, imagining it to be their unchallengeable right to be the drivers of the proletariat.

== Personality ==
Trotsky who knew Menzhinsky from when they were exiles, in 1920, left a scathing portrait of him: "The impression he made on me could best be described by saying that he made none at all. He seemed like a poor sketch for an unfinished portrait. Only now and then would an ingratiating smile or secret play of the eyes betray his eagerness from insignificance ... No-one took any notice of Menzhinsky, so quietly toiling away over his papers." He was master of more than 10 languages (including Korean, Chinese, Turkish, and Persian, the last one learned especially in order to read works by Omar Khayyám).

== Later life ==
After the February Revolution of 1917, Menzhinsky returned to Russia in the summer of that year and joined the Mezhraiontsy, an independent faction whose leading figure was Leon Trotsky who merged with the Bolsheviks in August 1917. A few days after the Bolshevik Revolution, he was appointed People's Commissar for Finance. His first act in this post was to drag a large sofa into his office, tacked a notice on it saying 'Commissariat of Finance', and lay down on it. Lenin came in and found him asleep. When officials at the Russian State Bank refused to recognise the new regime, Menzhinsky had the director and others arrested. According to G. von Schantz, Menzhinsky "personally conducted the wrecking of the Russian banks, a maneuver that deprived all opponents of Bolshevism of their financial means of warfare."

In April 1918, Menzhinsky was appointed Soviet consul general in Berlin, but in November, he was expelled, along with the Ambassador Adolph Ioffe. Posted to Ukraine, he joined Cheka in 1919, and five years later became a deputy chairman of its successor, the OGPU. After Felix Dzerzhinsky's death in July 1926 Menzhinsky became the chairman of the OGPU. Menzhinsky played a great role in conducting the secret Trust and Sindikat-2 counterintelligence operations, in the course of which leaders of large anti-Soviet centers abroad, Boris Savinkov and Sidney Reilly, were lured to the Soviet Union and arrested.

Meanwhile, the Chekist, Menzhinsky was loyal to Joseph Stalin, whose personality cult had already begun to form, coinciding with several important purges in 1930 to 1931.

== Death ==
Menzhinsky spent his last years as an invalid, suffering from acute angina since the late 1920s, which rendered him incapable of physical exertion. He conducted the affairs of the OGPU while lying upon a couch in his office at the Lubyanka, but rarely interfered in the day-to-day operation of the GPU. Stalin tended to deal with his first deputy Genrikh Yagoda, who essentially took over as head of the organization in all but name beginning in the late 1920s.

Menzhinsky died on 10 May 1934, at the age of 59. When his successor, Yagoda, made his public confession under duress at the Moscow Trial of the Twenty One in 1938, Yagoda stated that he had poisoned Menzhinsky. In 1988, the Soviet authorities admitted that the entire trial was based on false confessions forced out of the defendants, but Yagoda was not rehabilitated.

Menzhinsky was cremated and his ashes was buried in the Kremlin Wall Necropolis.

== Gallery ==
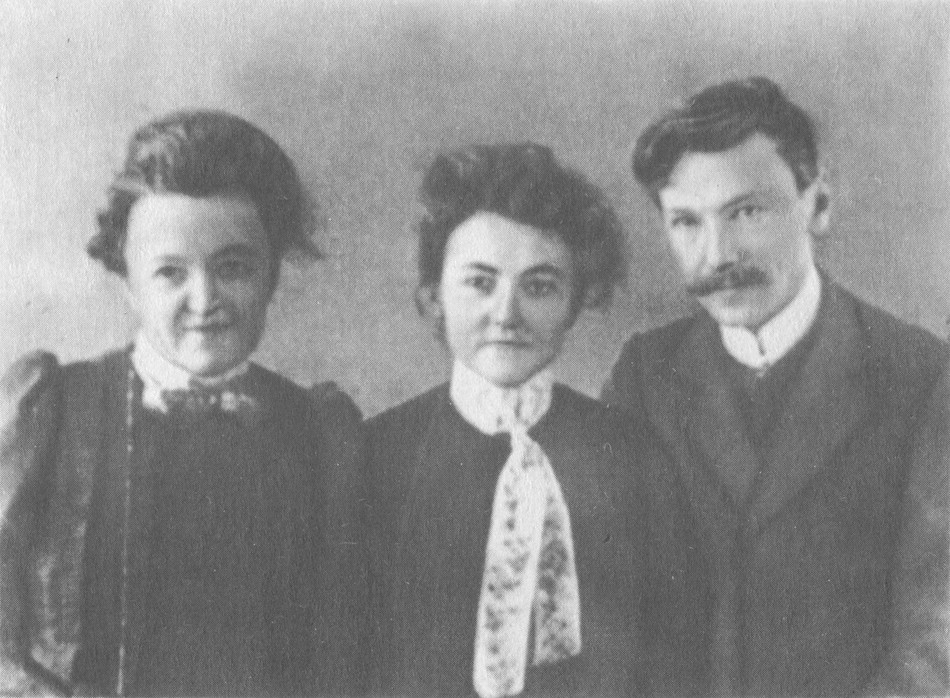
Menzhinsky with his sisters

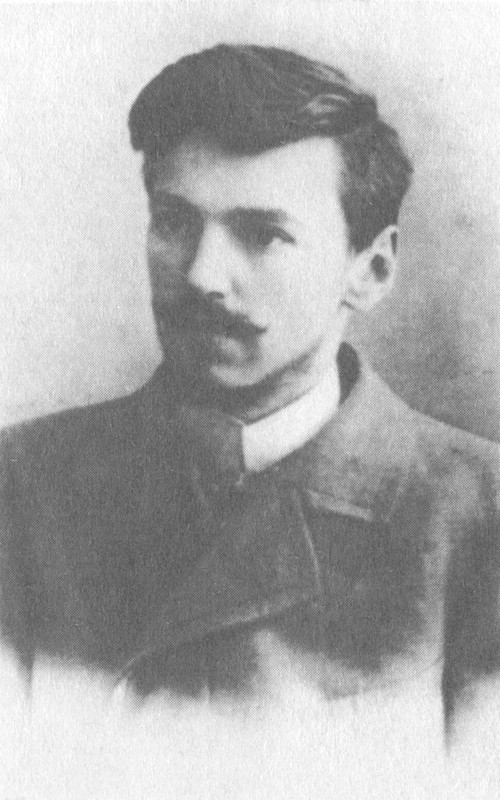
Menzhinsky, 1899

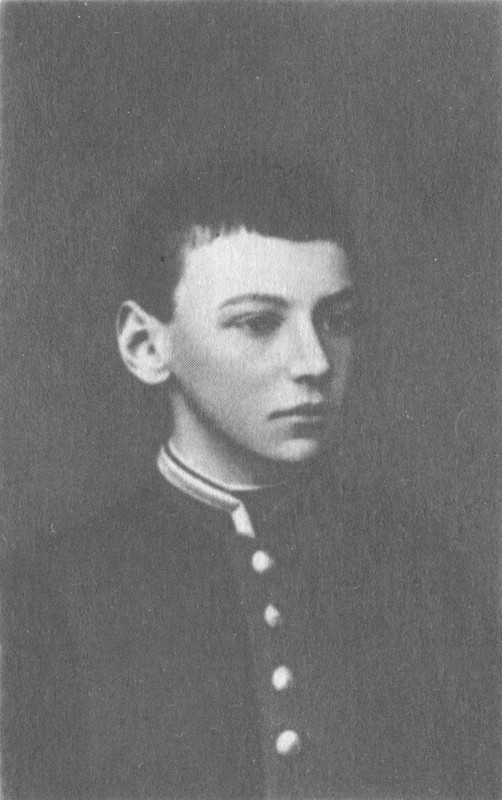
Menzhinsky sometime in the 1880s

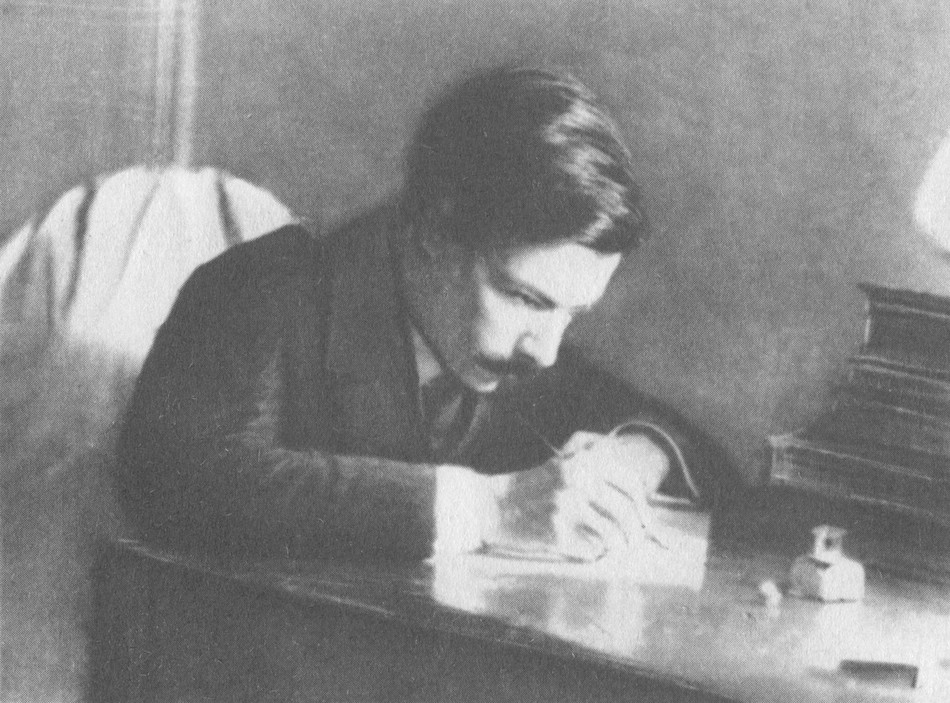
Menzhinsky, 1905

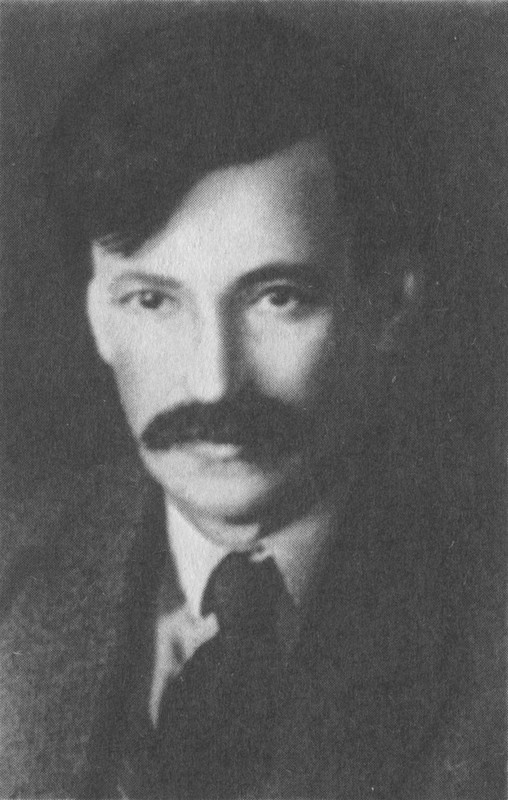
Menzhinsky, 1917

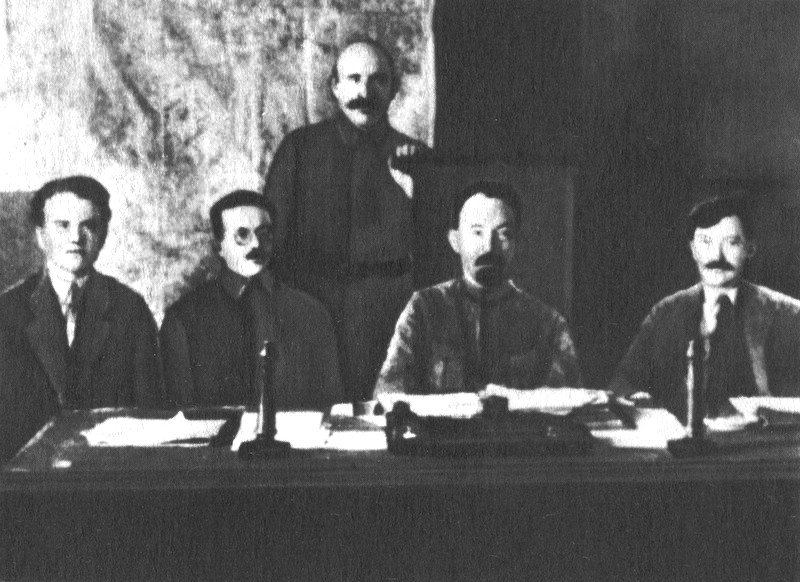
Members of the presidium of CheKa (left to right) Yakov Peters, Józef Unszlicht, Abram Belenky (standing), Felix Dzerzhinsky, Menzhinsky, 1921

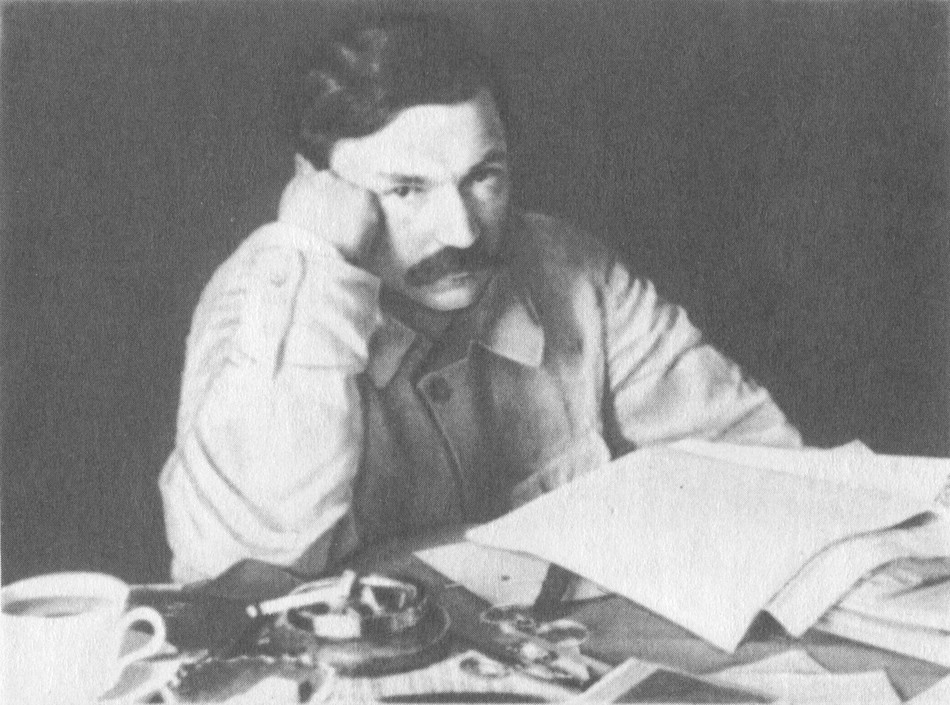
Menzhinsky, 1926

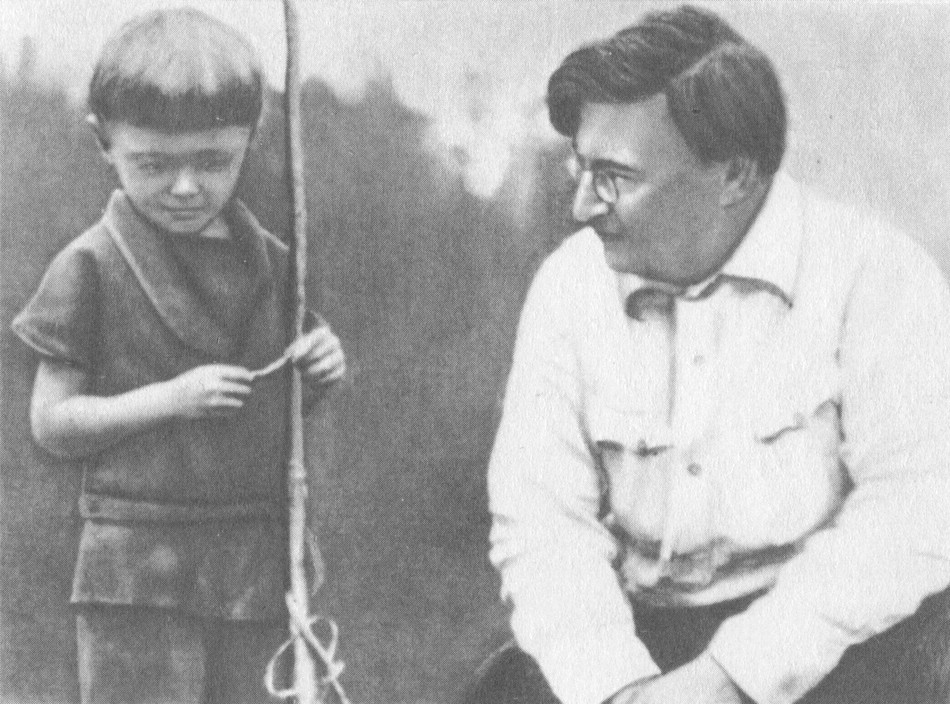
Menzhinsky with his son Rudolf

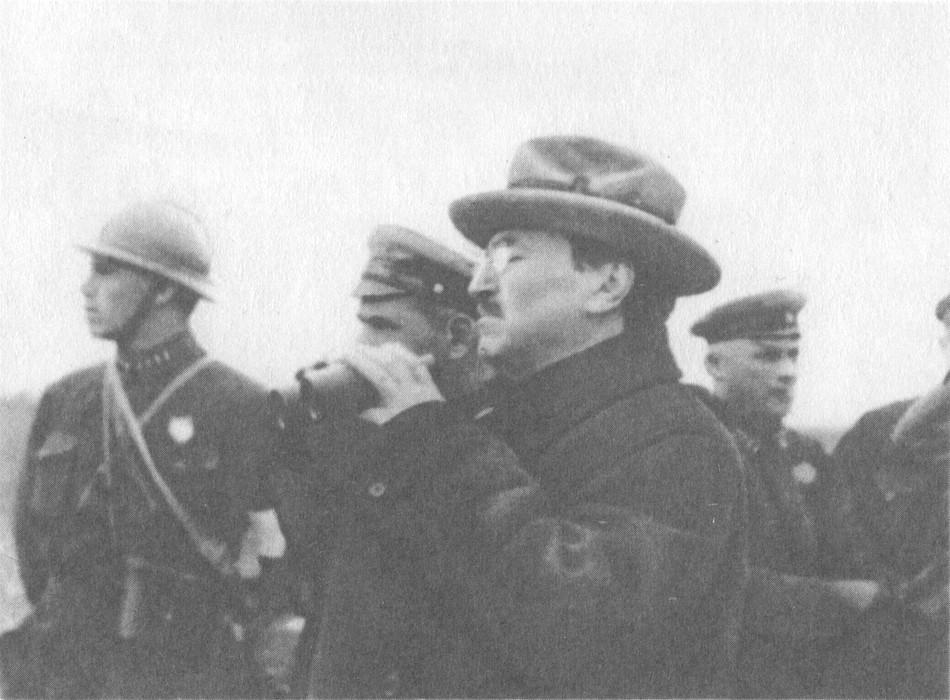
Menzhinsky, 1928

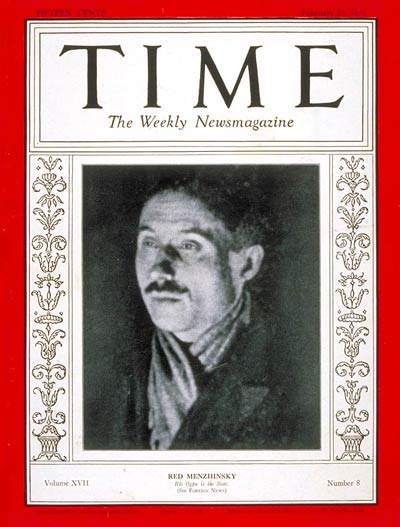
Menzhinsky, cover of Time magazine, 1931

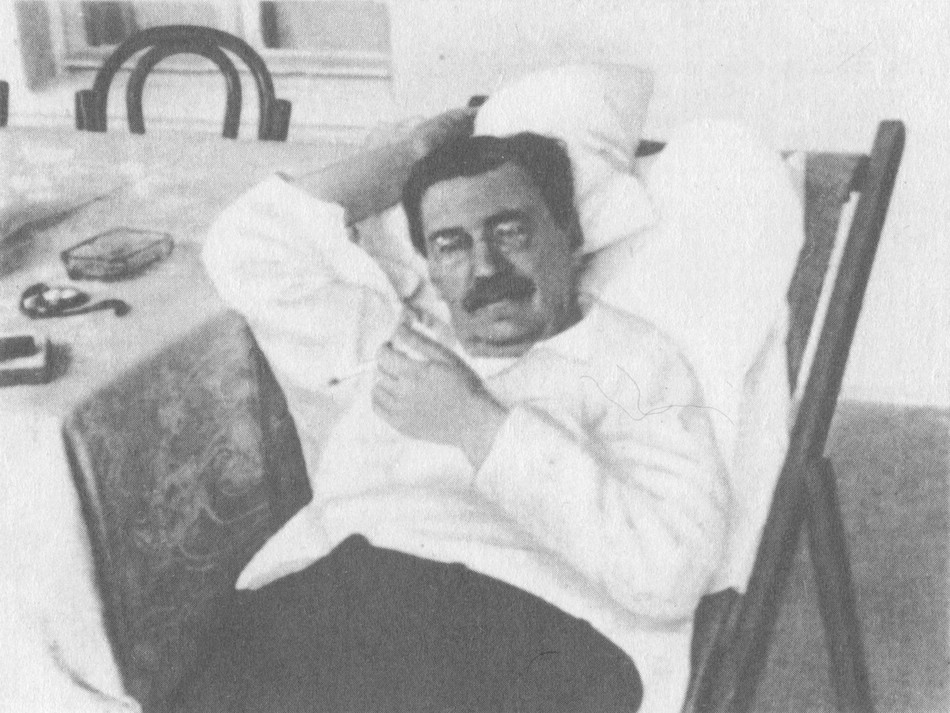
Menzhinsky, 1932

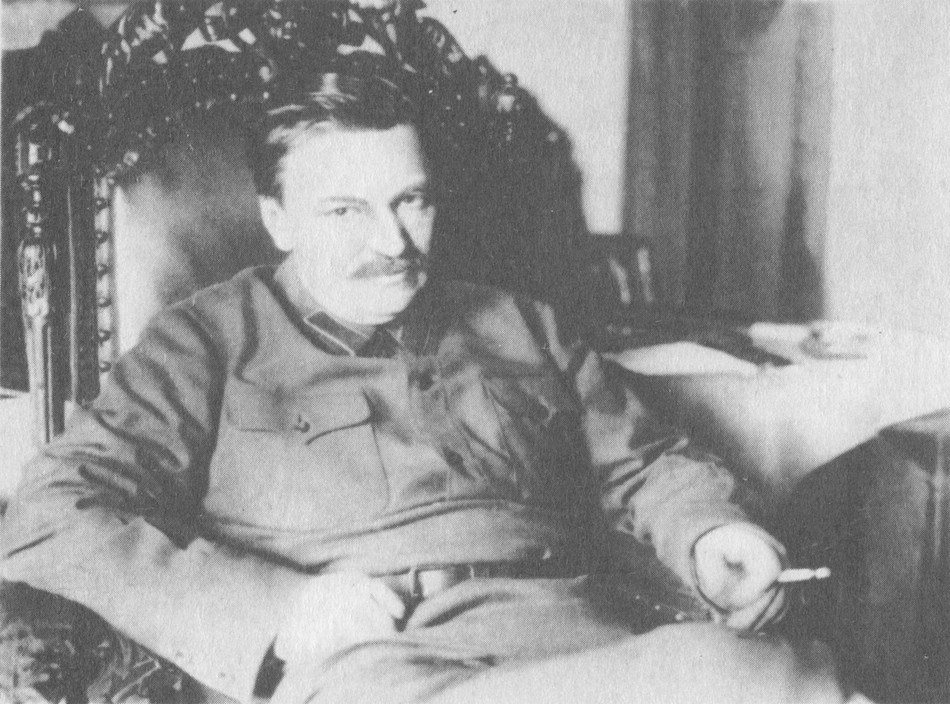
Menzhinsky, 1933 (last known photo)

== See also ==
- Outline of the Russian Revolution and Civil War
- Bibliography of the Russian Revolution and Civil War
- Bibliography of Stalinism and the Soviet Union
- Index of Old Bolsheviks
- Index of articles related to the Russian Revolution and Civil War
- Chronology of Soviet secret police agencies
- Commanders of the border troops USSR and RF

Political offices
Preceded by Ivan Skvortsov-Stepanov	People's Commissar for Finance of the RSFSR; 30 October 1917 – 21 March 1918	Succeeded by Isidore Gukovsky
