= Ivan Fadeev =

Russian economist and politician (1906–1976)

- Иван Фадеев

Minister of Finance of the RSFSR
- In office September 1949 – March 1973
- Preceded by: Arseny Safronov
- Succeeded by: Andrei Bobrovnikov

Personal details
- Born: 24 March 1906 Gzhatsk, Smolensk region, Russian Empire
- Died: 21 October 1976 (aged 70) Moscow, RSFSR, Soviet Union
- Resting place: Novodevichy cemetery, Moscow
- Party: Communist Party of the Soviet Union
- Spouse: Claudia Ivanovna Fadeeva
- Profession: Economist

Ivan Ivanovich Fadeev (Russian: Иван Иванович Фадеев; 24 March 1906 – 21 October 1976) was a Soviet economist and politician who served as the minister of finance of the Russian Soviet Federative Socialist Republic (RSFSR) from September 1949 to March 1973.

== Biography ==
Fadeev was born on 24 March 1906 in Gzhatsk, now Gagarin, in the Smolensk region. Until 1924 he was in the army. Then, he completed his undergraduate education at the Moscow Financial and Economic Institute in 1930. In 1937 he joined the Communist Party of the Soviet Union. He served there in several posts, including head of the national economy sector of the People's Commissariat of Finance of the Yakut ASSR, and deputy of the People's Commissar of Finance of the Yakut ASSR. In October 1938 he began to work in the central office of the Ministry of Finance. From 1938 to 1941 he was the head of the budget department of the ministry. Between 1941 and 1942 he was the deputy at the ministry's department for state control. From September 1949 to March 1973, he served as the minister of finance. In addition, he was elected several times as a deputy to the Supreme Soviet of the RSFSR during his career. Fadeev retired from the office in 1973.

Fadeev married Claudia Ivanovna Fadeeva (1905-1980) who was also an economist. He died in Moscow on 21 October 1976 and was buried there in Novodevichy cemetery. He was the recipient of various awards, including the Order of Lenin, the October Revolution, the Red Banner of Labor and other medals.
