= Rakovsky =

Rakovsky is a surname. Notable people with the surname include:

- Christian Rakovsky (1873–1941), Bulgarian and Soviet socialist revolutionary
- Igor Rakovsky (born 1975), Russian footballer
- Martin Rakovský (c. 1535–1579), Renaissance-era Hungarian poet and humanist scholar
- Patrick Rakovsky (born 1993), German football player
- Puah Rakovsky (1865–1955), professional educator, Zionist activist and feminist leader
- Vasily Rakovsky (1898–1978), Soviet general
- Zsuzsa Rakovsky (born 1950), Hungarian translator and writer

== See also ==
- Rakovski (disambiguation)
- Rakowski
