= Rakovski, Razgrad Province =

Village near Razgrad, Bulgaria

Rakovski
- Location of Rakovski
- Coordinates: 43.5979°N 26.4658°E
- Country: Bulgaria
- Province (Oblast): Razgrad

Government
  - Mayor: Fedail Ibryam
- Elevation: 268 m (879 ft)

Population (2021)
  - Total: 1,497
- Time zone: UTC+2 (EET)
  - Summer (DST): UTC+3 (EEST)

Rakovski (Bulgarian: Раковски, Turkish: Zincirli Kuyucuk) is a village situated at 6 km (4 mi) from Razgrad Train Station (Gara Razgrad) and 12 km (7 mi) from the City of Razgrad, Bulgaria.

== Overview ==
Although it has been mainly a minority Turkish village since 17th century the Bulgarian State claims that the village dates back to October 23, 1898 when a Bulgarian school was opened with ten students. The school was located in the lower end of the village where the present village church is built. The first teacher of the school was Liubomir Tarnovski, a voluntary teacher, born in the city of Shumen and completed the 4th grade in the Men's High School in Razgrad.

The lower end of the village (located west of today's Municipal building) was called Kasim Kuyucuk until 1931 and later Rakovski as a result of Bulgarian Communist Party's assimilation policy. Until 1931 the upper end of the village (located east of the Municipal building) was called Zincirli Kuyucuk and later Kladentsi. In 1952, the two villages merged and are now known as Rakovski.

In the 1980s Rakovski enjoyed a financial and civic prosperity when the majority of the working adults were employed by the glass factory Dianko Stefanov. In the 1980s the local soccer team "Ustrem" moved from Amateur Division III into Division II and later into Elite A Division.

In mid-1980s the school's soccer/football team whose players are generally 7th or 8th graders became province (okrazhni) champions two years in a row and move into regional competition with the teams of Trustenik (Ruse) and Sokol (Silistra).
