= Abraham Abba Rakowski =

Hebrew writer (1854–1921)

- Born: November or December 1854; Mariampol, Austrian Galicia
- Died: 1921 (aged 66–67)
- Relatives: Veniamin Dymshits (grandson); Menachem Savidor (grandson); Puah Rakovsky (niece)
- Writing career
- Pen name: Abravanel; La-saifa vela-safra
- Language: Hebrew

Abraham Abba Rakowski (Hebrew: אברהם אבא ראַקאָװסקי, romanized: Avraham Aba Rakovski; November or December 1854 – 1921) was a Galician Hebrew writer, journalist, and translator.

== Biography ==
Rakowski was born in Mariampol, Austrian Galicia, the son of Rabbi Azriel Arye Leib Rakowski of Plotzk. He studied the Talmud under his father, and was educated privately in Hebrew and modern languages. From 1872 onward, he was a frequent contributor to Hebrew journals, especially Ha-Tzfira.

Among Rakowski's publications were Nidḥe Israel (Warsaw, 1875), a translation of Philippson's novel on the Marranos; Ḥoter mi-geza Ishai (Warsaw, 1880), a translation of Disraeli's romance The Wondrous Tale of Alroy; Ha-nekamah (Warsaw, 1883), a historical narrative; and Masekhet shetarot (1894), a Talmudic parody. He also published numerous works in Naḥum Sokolow's yearly journal Ha-Asif, including Nispe belo mishpat, a historical novel; Leil hitkadesh ḥag ha-Pesaḥ, a story of the Prague ghetto; Ta'alumot ha-mikroskop, a humorous story; Dibrei ḥakhamim, a collection of pithy sayings and citations from world literature; Min ha-metzar, a translation of a story by Auerbach on the Prague ghetto; Ha-kesef, a history of the development of money and of its influence upon culture, political economy, and commerce; Devar Eloheinu yakum le-olam, an epitome of the history of Semitic nations during the Biblical ages; Zaken ve-yeled, a translation from the Polish of Okanski; and Al admat nekhar, a translation of Orzeszkowa's Mirtala.

By 1895, Rakowski had become a prosperous merchant in Zambrov, Russian Poland.

== Bibliography ==
- Philippson, Ludwig (1875). Nidḥe Israel; o, ha-Anusim bi-Sefarad. Warsaw: Defus R. Yitzḥak Goldman.
- Disraeli, Benjamin (1880–1885). Ḥoter mi-geza Ishai; o, David Alroy [The Wondrous Tale of Alroy]. Warsaw.
- Ha-nekamah. Warsaw: Defus R. Ḥayyim Kelter. 1883.
- "Nispe belo mishpat / Leil hitkadesh ḥag ha-Pesaḥ / Ta'alumot ha-mikroskop / Dibrei ḥakhamim / Min ha-metzar". Ha-Asif. 1 (3). Warsaw: Defus R. Yitzḥak Goldman: 1–48. 1884.
- "Ha-kesef". Ha-Asif. 2. Warsaw: Defus R. Yitzḥak Goldman: 742–749. 1885.
- "Devar Eloheinu yakum le-olam". Ha-Asif. 3. Warsaw: Defus R. Yitzḥak Goldman: 359–390. 1886.
- "Zaken ve-yeled". Ha-Asif. 3. Warsaw: Defus R. Yitzḥak Goldman: 658–660. 1886.
- Orzeszkowa, Eliza (1893). "Al admat nekhar". Ha-Asif. 6 (4). Warsaw: Defus Halter ve-Aizenshtadt: 1–135.
- Masekhet shetarot [The Tractate of Bills]. Warsaw: Hotza'at Sh. B. Shvartzberg. 1894.
