= Ivan Skvortsov-Stepanov =

Russian revolutionary, economist and journalist (1870–1928)

- Иван Скворцов-Степанов
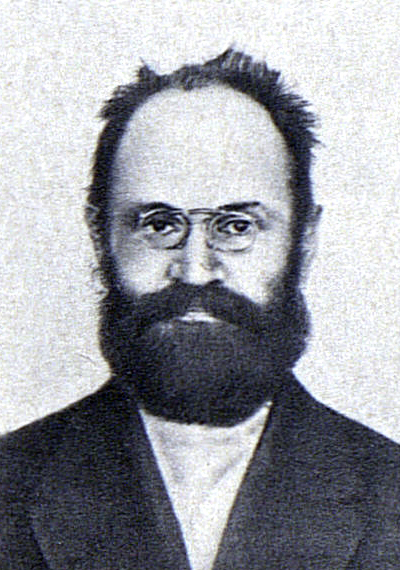
- Skvortsov-Stepanov in 1926

People's Commissar for Finance of the RSFSR
- In office 27 October 1917 – 30 October 1917
- Premier: Vladimir Lenin
- Succeeded by: Vyacheslav Menzhinsky

Director of the Lenin Institute under the Central Committee
- In office 1926–1928
- Preceded by: Lev Kamenev
- Succeeded by: Maximilian Saveliev

Personal details
- Born: Ivan Ivanovich Skvortsov; 8 March 1870 Bogorodsk, Moscow Governorate, Russian Empire
- Died: 8 October 1928 (aged 58) Sochi, Russian SFSR, Soviet Union
- Resting place: Kremlin Wall Necropolis, Moscow
- Party: RSDLP (1898–1903); RSDLP (Bolsheviks) (1903–1918); Russian Communist Party (1918–1928)

Ivan Ivanovich Skvortsov-Stepanov (Russian: Ива́н Ива́нович Скворцо́в-Степа́нов; 8 March [O.S. 24 February] 1870 – 8 October 1928) was a prominent Russian Bolshevik revolutionary and Soviet politician.

Ivan Ivanovich Skvortsov-Stepanov was one of the oldest participants in the Russian revolutionary movement as well as a Marxist writer, economist, historian and journalist.

== Early life ==
Ivan Skvortsov was born in Maltsevo-Brodovo village, Bogorodsky Uezd, Moscow province – the village is now Lesnye Polyany, in Pushkinsky District. He was the son of a Moscow factory clerical worker based in Bogorodsk.

== Early career ==
He graduated from the Moscow Teachers' Institute in 1890, became an elementary school teacher, joined the revolutionary movement as a student in Moscow in 1892, and joined the Russian Social Democratic Labour Party in 1898. He was arrested, and exiled to Tula district, where he met other exiles, including Alexander Bogdanov and Vladimir Bazarov. Together they joined the Bolsheviks after their release in the winter of 1904. When Bor'ba was published in November 1905, Skvortsov-Stepanov was a member of the editorial board. In 1906 he was a delegate to the Fourth Congress of the RSDLP, where he supported Lenin. During the period 1907–10, he favoured the Mezhraiontsy faction, but later fell again under the influence of Lenin. In 1907–09, he, Bazarov and Bogdanov produced what became the standard Russian translation of Das Kapital, by Karl Marx. In 1911, he launched the Bolshevik newspaper Mysl, but was arrested very soon afterwards. He was repeatedly arrested and exiled for his revolutionary activities.

Following the Revolution of 1917 he became the People's Commissar for Finance of the RSFSR, until February 1918, when the Bolsheviks briefly formed a coalition government with the Left Socialist-Revolutionaries. He joined the Left Communists, who opposed the Treaty of Brest-Litovsk with Germany. He worked on Pravda in 1918–1925. During the war with Poland, in 1920, he was appointed a member of the short-lived Polish provisional government.

== Conflict with Mayakovsky ==
In September 1921, Skvortsov-Stepanov became embroiled in a dispute with the young Futurist poet, Vladimir Mayakovsky. Like most leading Bolsheviks, he was unable to see any value in Mayakovsky's work, although the poet was an active supporter of the Bolsheviks, who had been imprisoned under the old regime. When Skvortsov-Stepanov learned that the script of Mayakovsky's play, Mystery Bouffe had been published in full in a magazine called Theatre Herald, he banned its editors from paying the author's commission. Mayakovsky appealed to the Moscow Trade Union Council, who ordered that his fee should be paid, and suspended the union memberships of Skvortsov-Stepanov and two other Gosizdat officials for three months. The decision outraged a senior contributor to Pravda, Lev Sosnovsky, who called for a ban on Mayakovsky's entire works. This threat was not carried out, and a few months later, Lenin publicly praised Mayakovsky's poetry for its political insight.

== Later career ==
Skvortsov-Stepanov was appointed chief editor of Izvestia in June 1925, having supported the triumvirate of Josif Stalin, Grigory Zinoviev and Lev Kamenev against Leon Trotsky. When the split within the triumvirate came to a head at the congress of the Communist Party of the Soviet Union in December 1926, he backed Stalin, was elected to the CPSU Central Committee, and when the committee met, on 28 December 1925, they decided by a majority to appoint him editor of Leningradskaya Pravda, in place of one of Zinoviev's supporters, despite objections from Zinoviev, Trotsky and others that editors of local newspaper should be appointed locally. When he arrived at the newspaper's office to impose a pro-Stalin political line, delegates from several Leningrad party organisations came to threaten him with violence, and members of staff walked out in protest denouncing those who stayed behind as spies, but the first pro-Stalin issue came out on 30 December.

Skvortsov-Stepanov was an ardent atheist, and a leading figure of the League of Militant Atheists. Together with its chairman Yemelyan Yaroslavsky, he was one of the main initiators of the atheistic propaganda campaign in the Soviet Union. His pamphlet, "Thoughts on Religion" was widely published and read.

Skvortsov-Stepanov remained in Leningrad for only a short period, before returning to his old job in Moscow. Upon his death from typhoid in October 1928, Stalin commemorated him as a "staunch and steadfast Leninist". His ashes were buried in the Kremlin Wall Necropolis.

== Personality ==
The writer Maxim Gorky described Skvortsov as "a short man with a greyish complexion, his light blue eyes smiled, however, the triumphant smile of the lucky man who has a truth inaccessible to others...He eschewed all books except Das Kapital – he made a boast of that."

== Publications ==
- Izbrannye ateisticheskie proizvedenii'a

Political offices
Preceded by Mikhail Bernatsky	People's Commissar for Finance of the RSFSR; 26 October 1917 – 20 January 1918	Succeeded by Vyacheslav Menzhinsky
