= Vladimir Orlov (economist) =

Russian politician and economist (born 1936)

Vladimir Yefimovich Orlov (Russian: Владимир Ефимович Орлов; born 1936) is a Russian politician and economist.

== Life and career ==
Orlov served as the Minister of finance between 7 March 1991 and 28 August 1991. He was the last minister prior to the dissolution of the Soviet Union.
