= Teresa Rakowska-Harmstone =

Polish-Canadian political scientist

- Born: 1927
- Died: January 2, 2017 (aged 89–90)
- Education: McGill University; Harvard University
- Scientific career
- Fields: Political science
- Workplaces: American University; Rutgers University; Carleton University; Collegium Civitas

Teresa Jadwiga Rakowska-Harmstone (1927–2017) was a Polish-Canadian political scientist. She was an expert in the politics of Eastern Europe, Soviet Studies, and post-Soviet Studies. Rakowska-Harmstone was a professor at Carleton University from 1966 until her death, where she helped establish the Institute of Soviet and East European Studies and was head of the Department of Political Science. She was also a professor at Collegium Civitas from its founding, and served a term as the head of the Department of International Relations there.

== Life and career ==
Rakowska-Harmstone moved to Montreal when her father was named the Polish consul there. She attended McGill University, where she obtained a bachelor's degree in 1950, and then she graduated from Harvard University with a Master of Arts degree in 1952. In 1966, she obtained her doctorate there.

From 1952 to 1960, Rakowska-Harmstone worked as a researcher at American University. In 1960 she became a lecturer at Douglas College, which was the women's college of Rutgers University. In 1966, she joined Carleton University as an assistant professor, and she became a full professor there in 1974. She was the director of Carleton University's Institute for Russian and East European Studies from 1973 to 1975, and has been credited with helping to establish that center. She was also head of the Department of Political Science from 1986 to 1989. In 1995, Rakowska-Harmstone retired to become an emeritus professor at Carleton University, and she became a Fellow at the Davis Center for Russian and Eurasian Studies at Harvard University. When the Collegium Civitas was founded in Warsaw, Rakowska-Harmstone joined its faculty, and headed the Department of International Relations from 1992 to 1995.

Rakowska-Harmstone was a prominent scholar of Soviet and Eastern European studies in Canada. Her textbook Communism in Eastern Europe, first printed in 1979, was considered a classic work on the subject. Rakowska-Harmstone was a member of the Polish Scientific Institute in America.

== Selected works ==
- Russia and Nationalism in Central Asia: The Case of Tadzhikistan (1970)
- Communism in Eastern Europe (1979)
- Warsaw Pact: Political and Military Integration; A Political Analysis (1990)
- Disintegration and Re-definition of East Europe (1992)
