= Ministry of Finance (RSFSR) =

Soviet Union government department

Ministry of Finance of the RSFSR
- Министерство финансов РСФСР
- Emblem of the Russian SFSR

Agency overview
- Formed: 8 November 1917; 108 years ago
- Dissolved: 15 November 1991; 34 years ago
- Superseding agency: Ministry of Economics and Finance of the Russian Federation (1991), Ministry of Finance of the Russian Federation (1992)
- Jurisdiction: Russian Soviet Federative Socialist Republic
- Headquarters: Moscow, RSFSR, Soviet Union

The Ministry of Finance of the Russian Soviet Federative Socialist Republic (Russian: Министерство финансов РСФСР), known prior to 1946 as the People's Commissariat for Finance (Russian: Народный комиссариат финансов), or shortened to Narkomfin, was part of the government of the Russian Soviet Federative Socialist Republic from 1918 until the fall of the USSR in 1991. It was subordinate to the Ministry of Finance of the USSR.

== History ==
The Narkomfin commissar was part of Sovnarkom. Nikolai Krestinsky was the first commissar, appointed in 1918. However, following the introduction of the New Economic Policy, Narkomfin was made responsible for Gosbank, the State Bank of the RSFSR and then the Soviet Union. On 26 November 1921, Lenin issued a note calling for the appointment of Grigory Sokolnikov, who took control of the organisation in 1922, although his formal position was not ratified until December 1922.

In 1946, the People's Commissariat for Finance was transformed and renamed into the Ministry of Finance of the RSFSR.

After the failed August Coup of 1991, Boris Yeltsin and the RSFSR Ministry of Finance claimed authority over the Ministry of Finance of the USSR, the Gosbank, and Vnesheconombank. These Soviet institutions could not carry out any orders without the consent of the RSFSR Ministry of Finance. The Ministry of Finance of the USSR continued functioning until the Ministry of Finance of the RSFSR issued a decree completing its takeover of the Soviet financial system. The RSFSR Ministry of Finance was succeeded by the Ministry of Economics and Finance of the Russian Federation (1991), and the Ministry of Finance of the Russian Federation (1992).

== Commissars and ministers ==
| Name | Took office | Left office |
People's Commissar for Finance of the RSFSR
| Ivan Skvortsov-Stepanov | 27 October 1917 | 30 October 1917 |
| Vyacheslav Menzhinsky | 30 October 1917 | 21 March 1918 |
| Isidore Gukovsky | 21 March 1918 | 16 August 1918 |
| Nikolay Krestinsky | 16 August 1918 | 22 November 1922 |
| Grigori Sokolnikov | 22 November 1922 | 6 July 1923 |
| Miron Vladimirov | 6 July 1923 | November 1924 |
| Nikolay Milyutin | December 1924 | December 1929 |
| Varvara Yakovleva | January 1930 | September 1937 |
| Nikolai Sokolov | September 1937 | February 1938 |
| Vasily Popov | February 1938 | 20 April 1939 |
| Mikhail Umnov | 21 April 1939 | September 1939 |
| Arseny Safronov | October 1939 | 28 March 1941 |
| Alexei Poskonov | 28 March 1941 | 18 July 1945 |
| Arseny Safronov | 18 July 1945 | 23 March 1946 |
Minister of Finance of the RSFSR
| Arseny Safronov | 23 March 1946 | July 1949 |
| Ivan Fadeev | September 1949 | March 1973 |
| Andrei Bobrovnikov | March 1973 | 10 May 1990 |
| Boris Fyodorov | 18 July 1990 | 5 December 1990 |
| Igor Lazarev | 5 December 1990 | 11 November 1991 |

== See also ==
- Government of the Soviet Union – Ministries
  - Ministry of Finance of the USSR
