= Puah Rakovsky =

Israeli Zionist activist and feminist leader

- פועה רקובסקי
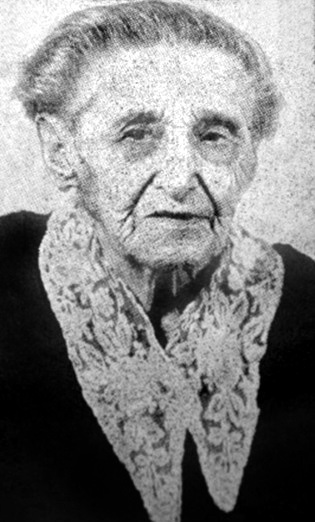
- Born: 3 July 1865; Białystok, Poland
- Died: May 13, 1955 (aged 89); Haifa
- Known for: Feminism

Puah Rakovsky (Hebrew: פועה רקובסקי; 1865–1955) was a professional educator, Zionist activist and feminist leader. She worked towards upliftment of Jewish women.

== Early life ==
Rakovsky was born on July 3, 1865, in Białystok, Poland, in a traditionally prosperous Jewish family. Her father Menahem Mendel was a trained rabbi, worked as a commission agent and was seventeen years old at her birth. Her mother was fifteen when Rakovsky was born. She was the oldest child of her parents and had fourteen siblings.

== Personal life ==
Rakovsky married four times and had three children – two daughters and a son. She moved to Israel in 1935.

== Education ==
Rakovsky was homeschooled and studied Hebrew, Yiddish and secular subjects. She had to discontinue studies when she was married at the age of 16 to Shlomo Malchin who was ten years older. It was an arranged marriage, which she had initially opposed. She wanted to study to become a midwife, but both her parents and her husband opposed the idea. She eventually persuaded her family to let her study and attained a teaching license.

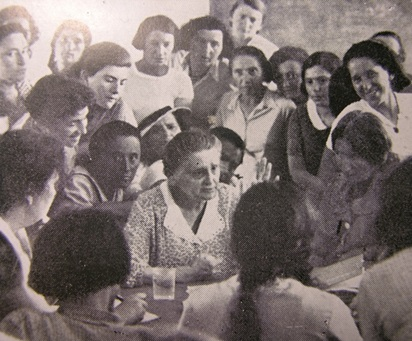

== Career ==
Rakovsky took up teaching in 1889. She taught Hebrew in a girls' school in Łomża, Poland. In 1891, she was employed by a Jewish girls' school in Warsaw as a teacher and director. In 1893, she opened a school for girls where Hebrew and Jewish was taught to female students. This school ran until World War I and was of national importance.

In Warsaw, Rakovsky became an active member of the Zionist community. Even with her work on the community, she focused on women and their upliftment. Her extensive work and vocal activism led her to be a popular figure in the country.

In 1920, Rakovsky founded the Jewish Women’s Association (YFA) in Warsaw which came to be known as a national organization for Zionism and feminist by its belief. The association worked towards providing secular and vocational education to Jewish women and to prepare them to be independent.

== Notable work ==
In 1940–42, her memoirs were published in Hebrew and Yiddish. In her autobiography, she labeled herself a "Radical Jewish Woman".

1. Di yidishe froy, Warsaw, 1918;
2. Modern day froyen-bavegung, Warsaw, 1928;
3. Lo Nikhnati, translated and abridged by David Kalai, Tel Aviv, 1951;
4. Puah Rakovsky, P.E. Hyman; trans. B. Harshav (ed.), My Life as a Radical Jewish Woman: Memoirs of a Zionist Feminist in Poland, (2002).
