= Ministry of Finance (Soviet Union) =

Government ministry of the Soviet Union

Ministry of Finance of the USSR
- Министерство финансов СССР
- All ministry seals of the Soviet Union used the Soviet coat of arms

Agency overview
- Formed: 16 July 1923
- Dissolved: 4 February 1992
- Superseding agency: Ministry of Finance of the Russian Federation (1992)
- Jurisdiction: Government of the Soviet Union
- Headquarters: Moscow, Russian SFSR, Soviet Union

The Ministry of Finance of the Union of Soviet Socialist Republics (USSR) (Russian: Министерство финансов СССР), formed on 15 March 1946, was one of the most important government offices in the Soviet Union. Until 1946 it was known as the People's Commissariat for Finance (Russian: Народный комиссариат финансов – Narodnyi komissariat finansov, or "Narkomfin"). Narkomfin, at the all-Union level, was established on 6 July 1923 after the signing of the Treaty on the Creation of the USSR, and was based upon the People's Commissariat for Finance of the Russian Soviet Federative Socialist Republic (RSFSR) formed in 1917. The Ministry was led by the Minister of Finance, prior to 1946 a Commissar, who was nominated by the Chairman of the Council of Ministers and then confirmed by the Presidium of the Supreme Soviet. The minister was a member of the Council of Ministers.

During the Russian Civil War, and immediately afterwards, the Commissariat usually confiscated property to support government operations. Following a short period of stability after the civil war the Commissariat introduced several governmental taxes on the population. The commissariat's structure differed little from its Tsarist predecessor, the only notable difference was that the Soviet ministry was very centralised while the Tsarist's finance ministry was a very decentralised one. The Commissariat, and later the Ministry, prepared the state budget in a joint process with its republican and local branches. The Ministry's structure went through few changes due to the Soviet government's conservative approaches to change. Soviet leader Mikhail Gorbachev introduced several reforms during his rule which had the unintended consequence of considerably hurting the ministry's prestige.

== Founding and early history ==
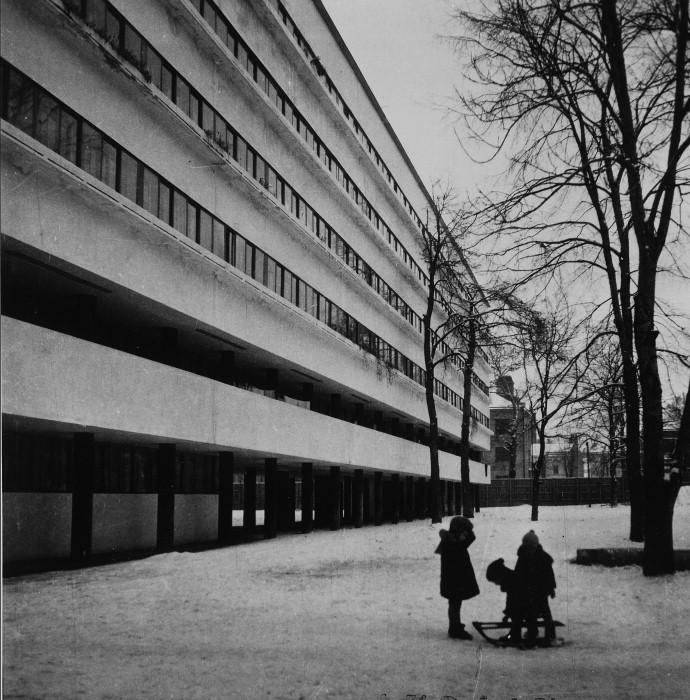
The Narkomfin Building was built to house employees of the Commissariat for Finance

The Ministry's predecessor, the People's Commissariat for Finance of the Russian Soviet Federative Socialist Republic (RSFSR), was established by a decree of the second convocation of the All-Russian Congress of Soviets on 8 November [O.S. 26 October] 1917 and was part of the Sovnarkom. The first Commissar was Ivan Skvortsov-Stepanov appointed in 1917. However, following the introduction of the New Economic Policy, Narkomfin was made responsible for Gosbank, the State Bank of the RSFSR and then the State Bank of the Soviet Union. On 26 November 1921 Lenin issued a note calling for the appointment of Grigory Sokolnikov to the newly established post of People's Commissar for Finance. Sokolnikov took control of the organisation in 1922, although his formal position was not ratified until November 1922. In 1946 the Council of People's Commissars was renamed the Council of Ministers and the People's Commissariat for Finance was renamed as the Ministry of Finance.

In 1928 the Soviet government launched a building program headed by the OSA group. The OSA group oversaw the construction of a building which should have housed the employees of the People's Commissariat for Finance. Due to its close connections with the Commissariat for Finance the building was often referred to as "the Narkomfin building". The building was designed by Moisei Ginzburg and Ignati Milinis and has a reputation for being one of the best examples of still-standing Soviet constructivist architecture. The architects tried to give the building a collective feel to it but, when the building was finished in 1932, it was denounced as a remnant of "leftist utopianism" by Joseph Stalin's regime. Unlike many other Soviet constructivist buildings there is an ongoing campaign to save it.

When Alexei Kosygin, the Chairman of the Council of Ministers, initiated the 1965 economic reform the Ministry of Finance sabotaged the reform by not fully implementing it which, along with many other reasons, helped the reform to fail.

== Duties and responsibilities ==
During the formation of the Soviet state, the People's Commissariat for Finance was created in the late 1910s and early 1920s to serve the needs of the Russian Soviet Federative Socialist Republic (RSFSR). The commissariat did not differ greatly from that of Imperial Russia's Ministry of Finance, however the Soviet finance ministry was a heavily centralised structure, while its predecessor was not. During its humble beginnings, the main task of the People's Commissariat of Finance were: confiscation of property, robbery and requisition; printing and creating money; and taxation.

In the immediate aftermath of the October Revolution, and during the Russian Civil War, the Soviet government forcibly confiscated property to support their government. After the inflation of the 1920s printing of money nearly ceased and confiscation of goods became harder; after years of confiscating there was simply not enough property left to fund government operations anymore. After the civil war the confiscation of property ceased and several government taxes were introduced. The ministry's tasks were summed up in the 1971 charter: "The USSR Ministry of Finance prepares the draft of the USSR State Budget and bears responsibility for the fulfilment of the USSR State Budget, both for receipts and for expenditures [...]". Under the rule of Mikhail Gorbachev the Ministry lost much of its power. An example being that before 1990 all foreign trade investments had to be approved by the Ministry of Finance but in 1990 the ministries of finance of the Union republics approved foreign investment. The ministry was of vital importance and in the 1971 charter the Soviet government gave the ministry broad legislative power. As nearly all organisations had some sort of financial aspects the Ministry of Finance set standards and rules for accounting and bookkeeping. It also had the power to issue regulations for the detailed application of the tax legislation. This is also a common feature in the United States Department of Treasury, although the Soviet's regulations differ in being of a highly centralised manner that the US one does not. The Ministry of Finance usually exercised its powers jointly with other government agencies. The 1971 charter states that the Ministry of Finance had the right to participate with the State Committee on Prices for price-setting in the USSR, but it also participated in the setting of salaries and the fulfillment of the five-year plans with the State Planning Committee and the State Bank of the USSR (Gosbank).

The finance ministry started the budget preparation process by preparing instructions, forms and schedules for the upcoming state budget and prepared a preliminary balance of revenues and expenditures using data estimated by the State Planning Committee (Gosplan). This preliminary budget was then sent, together with instructions, to the all-Union ministries and ministries of finance of the Union's republics. The Union branches of the Ministry of Finance then prepared a budget estimate with information received from the lower Union ministries and information given to them by the all-Union Ministry of Finance. The state budget was conceived after the Union Ministry negotiated a compromise with its republican and local branches and each Soviet republic was given its own state budget. The Economic Committees of the Supreme Soviet voted on the state budget which, if it received enough support, would become policy.

== Organisation ==
Positions

The leading office of the ministry was the Minister of Finance (titled "Commissars" until 1946), the head of the ministry. The offices of First Deputy Minister of Finance were seen as the ministry's second-in-command.

There were several Deputy Ministers of Finance, each of them focusing their responsibility in one specific area, for example the financial regulation of the Soviet automobile industry.

Departments

There were two departments in the Ministry of Finance, both of which were highly centralised but were sometimes subjected to direct control by the local CPSU Party Control Committees. The two departments had their own distinctive budget. The Head of the Department of Revisory Control was recommended by the Minister of Finance and approved by the Council of Ministers, the Head of the Department of Revisory Control for the Union republics was recommended by the republic's Minister of Finance and the Council of Ministers.

The Department of Revisory Control of the Ministry of Finance enforced financial discipline by the following means: observance of laws, supervising financial discipline, controlling the implementation of the state budget, controlling the activities of financial organs, controlling the national insurance of the workers, examining the activities of the State Bank, controlling the audit functions of the internal financial control and controlling the activities of the chief and his senior accountants.

The Department of Revisory Control of the Ministries of Finance of the Union Republics: Controlled the implementation of the national budget of the republican Ministries of Finance and their local counterparts. The department also exercised control over enterprises and institutions directly subordinate to the Soviet government. The Department of Budget was a department which took part in drafting the budget of the Soviet Republics.

== Disintegration ==
After the failed August Coup of 1991 Boris Yeltsin and the Ministry of Finance of the RSFSR claimed authority over the Ministry of Finance of the USSR, the State Bank and the Bank of Foreign Economic Activity. This meant that the institutions could not carry out any orders without the consent of the RSFSR government. The Ministry of Finance continued functioning until the RSFSR government issued a decree completing its takeover of the Soviet financial system. It was succeeded by the Ministry of Finance of the Russian Federation (1992). The last Soviet Minister of Finance was Vladimir Yefimovich Orlov, and Vladimir Rayevsky was acting Minister during the period of transition.

== Commissars and ministers ==
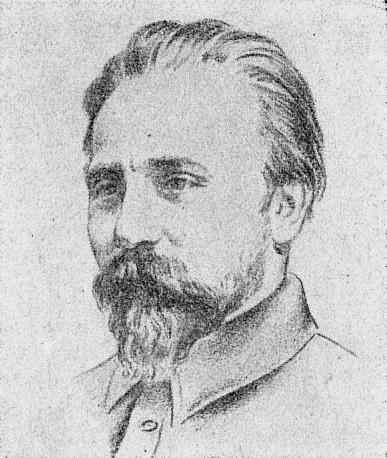
One of the Soviet Narkoms of Finance, Nikolai Bryukhanov, arrested and executed in 1938, during the Great Purge

The following persons headed the Commissariat/Ministry as commissars (narkoms), ministers, and deputy ministers:

Name	Took office	Left office	Duration
People's Commissar for Finance
Grigory Sokolnikov	6 July 1923	16 January 1926	2 years, 194 days
Nikolai Bryukhanov	16 January 1926	18 October 1930	4 years, 275 days
Hryhoriy Hrynko	18 October 1930	16 August 1937	6 years, 302 days
Vlas Chubar	16 August 1937	19 January 1938	156 days
Arseny Zverev (1st)	19 January 1938	15 March 1946	8 years, 55 days
Minister of Finance
Arseny Zverev (1st)	15 March 1946	16 February 1948	1 year, 338 days
Alexei Kosygin	16 February 1948	28 December 1948	306 days
Arseny Zverev (2nd)	28 December 1948	16 May 1960	11 years, 140 days
Vasily Garbuzov	16 May 1960	13 November 1985	25 years, 181 days
Boris Gostev	13 December 1985	7 June 1989	3 years, 175 days
Valentin Pavlov	17 July 1989	14 January 1991	1 year, 181 days
Vladimir Orlov	7 March 1991	28 August 1991	174 days
Vladimir Rayevsky (Acting)	21 August 1991	4 February 1992	167 days
First Deputy Minister of Finance (selected)
Alexei Poskonov (1st)	15 March 1946	1948	
Arseny Zverev	February 1948	December 1948	
Vasily Garbuzov	1953	16 May 1960	
Alexei Poskonov (2nd)	16 May 1960	1963	
Vladimir Sitnin	1963	August 1965	
Victor Dementsev	1973	January 1986	
Valentin Pavlov	January 1986	August 1986	
Nikolai Garetovsky	August 1986	1987	
Vladimir Panskov	1987	1991	
Vladimir Orlov	1990	7 March 1991	
Andrei Zverev	28 November 1991	1992	

== See also ==
- Government of the Soviet Union – Ministries
  - Ministry of Finance of the RSFSR
