= Rykov's third government =

Government of the Soviet Union

Rykov's Third government
- 4th government of the Soviet Union

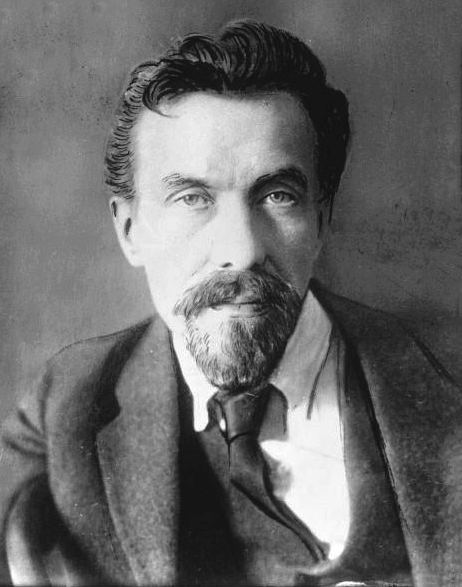
- Date formed: 21 May 1925
- Date dissolved: 26 April 1927

People and organisations
- Head of state: Mikhail Kalinin
- Head of government: Alexei Rykov
- Deputy head of government: Lev Kamenev
- No. of ministers: 14

History
- Predecessor: Rykov II
- Successor: Rykov IV

The Third Government of Rykov was the cabinet of the Soviet Union established on May 21, 1925, with Alexei Rykov as the head of government, serving as the President of the Council of People's Commissars.

It ended on April 26, 1927, when the Central Executive Committee of the Soviet Union approved a new composition of the Sovnarkom.

== Composition ==
| People's Commissar | Incumbent | Party |
|---|---|---|
| Chairman of the Council of People's Commissars of the Soviet Union | Alexei Rykov | CPSU (b) |
| Administrator of Affairs of the Council of People's Commissars | Nikolai Gorbunov | CPSU (b) |
| Vice Chairmen of the Council of People's Commissars of the Soviet Union | Lev Kamenev | CPSU (b) |
| Vice Chairmen of the Council of People's Commissars of the Soviet Union | Valerian Kuibyshev | CPSU (b) |
| Vice Chairmen of the Council of People's Commissars of the Soviet Union | Sergei Ordzhonikidze | CPSU (b) |
| Vice Chairmen of the Council of People's Commissars of the Soviet Union | Janis Rudzutaks | CPSU (b) |
| Vice Chairmen of the Council of People's Commissars of the Soviet Union | Alexander Tsiurupa | CPSU (b) |
| People's Commissar for Foreign Affairs of the USSR | Georgy Chicherin | CPSU (b) |
| People's Commissar for War and Naval Affairs | Mikhail Frunze (1925) | CPSU (b) |
| People's Commissar for War and Naval Affairs | Kliment Voroshilov (1925–1927) | CPSU (b) |
| People's Commissar of Foreign Trade (1925) | Leonid Krasin | CPSU (b) |
| People's Commissar of Internal Trade (1925) | Aron Sheinman | CPSU (b) |
| People's Commissar of Foreign Trade and Interior (1926–1927) | Alexander Tsiurupa (1925–1926) | CPSU (b) |
| People's Commissar of Foreign Trade and Interior (1926–1927) | Lev Kamenev (1926) | CPSU (b) |
| People's Commissar of Foreign Trade and Interior (1926–1927) | Anastas Mikoyan (1926–1927) | CPSU (b) |
| People's Commissar of Communication Routes | Janis Rudzutaks | CPSU (b) |
| People's Commissar for Posts and Telegraphs | Ivan Smirnov | CPSU (b) |
| People's Commissar for the Supreme Council of the National Economy | Felix Dzerzhinsky (1925–1926) | CPSU (b) |
| People's Commissar for the Supreme Council of the National Economy | Valerian Kuibyshev (1926–1927) | CPSU (b) |
| People's Commissar for Labor | Vasili Schmidt | CPSU (b) |
| People's Commissar of the Workers' and Peasants' Inspection | Valerian Kuibyshev (1925–1926) | CPSU (b) |
| People's Commissar of the Workers' and Peasants' Inspection | Sergei Ordzhonikidze (1926–1927) | CPSU (b) |
| People's Commissar for Finance | Grigori Sokolnikov | CPSU (b) |
| People's Commissar for Finance | Nikolai Bryukhanov | CPSU (b) |
