= Rykov's second government =

Government of the Soviet Union

Rykov's Second government
- 3rd government of the Soviet Union

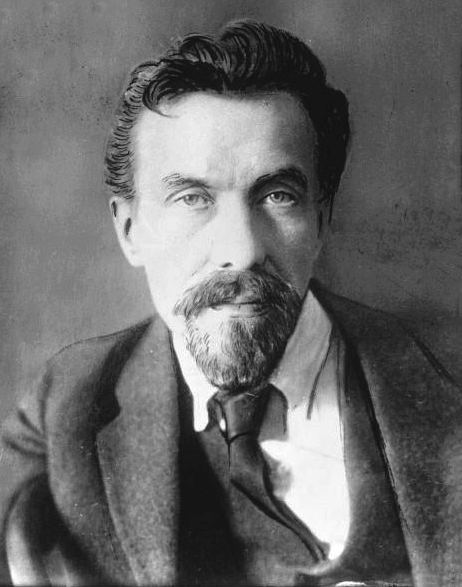
- Date formed: 2 February 1924
- Date dissolved: 20 May 1925

People and organisations
- Head of state: Mikhail Kalinin
- Head of government: Alexei Rykov
- Deputy head of government: Lev Kamenev
- No. of ministers: 14

History
- Predecessor: Rykov I
- Successor: Rykov III

Rykov's Second Government was the cabinet of the Soviet Union established on February 2, 1924, with Alexei Rykov as the head of government, serving as the President of the Council of People's Commissars after Lenin's death on January 21, 1924.

It ended on May 21, 1925, when the Central Executive Committee of the Soviet Union approved a new composition of the Sovnarkom.

== Composition ==
People's Commissar	Incumbent	Party
Chairman of the Council of People's Commissars of the Soviet Union	Alexei Rykov	CPSU (b)
Administrator of Affairs of the Council of People's Commissars	Nikolai Gorbunov	CPSU (b)
Vice Chairmen of the Council of People's Commissars of the Soviet Union	Lev Kamenev	CPSU (b)
Vice Chairmen of the Council of People's Commissars of the Soviet Union	Mamia Orakhelashvili	CPSU (b)
Vice Chairmen of the Council of People's Commissars of the Soviet Union	Alexander Tsiurupa	CPSU (b)
Vice Chairmen of the Council of People's Commissars of the Soviet Union	Vlas Chubar	CPSU (b)
People's Commissar for Foreign Affairs of the USSR	Georgy Chicherin	CPSU (b)
People's Commissar for War and Naval Affairs	Leon Trotsky (1924–1925)	CPSU (b)
People's Commissar for War and Naval Affairs	Mikhail Frunze (1925)	CPSU (b)
People's Commissar for Foreign Trade	Leonid Krasin	CPSU (b)
People's Commissar for Railways	Janis Rudzutaks	CPSU (b)
People's Commissar for Posts and Telegraphs of the USSR	Ivan Smirnov (politician)	CPSU (b)
People's Commissar for the Supreme Council of the National Economy	Felix Dzerzhinsky	CPSU (b)
People's Commissariat for Agriculture	Nikolai Bryukhanov	CPSU (b)
People's Commissar for Labour	Vasily Schmidt	CPSU (b)
People's Commissar of the Workers and Peasants Inspection	Valerian Kuibyshev	CPSU (b)
People's Commissar for Finance	Grigory Sokolnikov	CPSU (b)
People's Commissar for Internal Trade	Aron Sheinman	CPSU (b)
