= Rykov's fourth government =

Government of the Soviet Union

Rykov's Fourth government
- 5th government of the Soviet Union

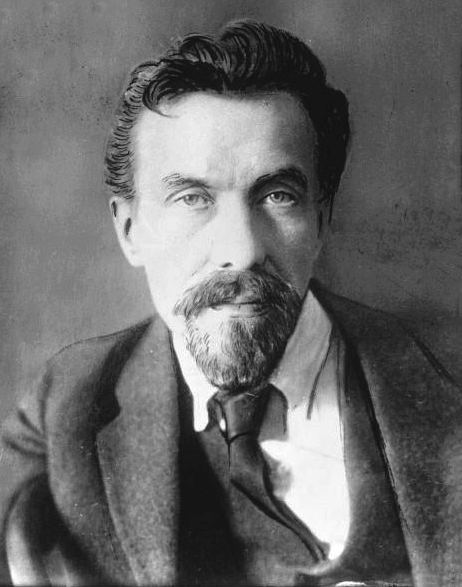
- Date formed: 26 April 1927
- Date dissolved: 29 May 1929

People and organisations
- Head of state: Mikhail Kalinin
- Head of government: Alexei Rykov
- Deputy head of government: Sergo Ordzhonikidze
- No. of ministers: 15

History
- Predecessor: Rykov III
- Successor: Rykov V

The Fourth Rykov Government was the cabinet of the Soviet Union established on April 26th, 1927, with Aleksei Rykov as the head of government, serving as the President of the Council of People's Commissars.

It ended on May 29th, 1929, when the Central Executive Committee of the Soviet Union approved a new composition of the Sovnarkom.

== Composition ==
People's Commissar	Incumbent	Party
Chairman of the Council of People's Commissars of the Soviet Union	Aleksei Rykov	CPSU (b)
Administrator of Affairs of the Council of People's Commissars	Nikolai Gorbunov	CPSU (b)
Vice Chairmen of the Council of People's Commissars	Sergo Ordzhonikidze	CPSU (b)
Vice Chairmen of the Council of People's Commissars	Janis Rudzutaks	CPSU (b)
Vice Chairmen of the Council of People's Commissars	Alexander Tsiurupa	CPSU (b)
Vice Chairmen of the Council of People's Commissars	Vasili Schmidt	CPSU (b)
People's Commissar for Foreign Affairs of the USSR	Georgy Chicherin	CPSU (b)
People's Commissar for War and Naval Affairs	Kliment Voroshilov	CPSU (b)
People's Commissar of Foreign Trade	Anastas Mikoyan	CPSU (b)
People's Commissar of Communication Routes of the Soviet Union	Janis Rudzutaks	CPSU (b)
People's Commissar for Posts and Telegraphs	Ivan Smirnov	CPSU (b)
People's Commissar for Posts and Telegraphs	Artemi Liubovich (1927-1928)	CPSU (b)
People's Commissar for Posts and Telegraphs	Nikolai Antipov (1928-1929)	CPSU (b)
Chairman of the Supreme Soviet of the National Economy	Valerian Kuibyshev	CPSU (b)
People's Commissar for Labor	Vasili Schmidt (1927-1928)	CPSU (b)
People's Commissar for Labor	Nikolai Uglanov (1928-1929)	CPSU (b)
People's Commissar for Inspection of Workers and Peasants	Sergo Ordzhonikidze	CPSU (b)
People's Commissar for Finance	Nikolai Bryukhanov	CPSU (b)

== Sources ==
- Khlevniuk, Oleg V. (2009), Master of the House: Stalin and His Inner Circle, translated by Seligman Favorov, Nora, New Haven, Connecticut: Yale University Press, ISBN 978-0-300-11066-1
