= Rykov's fifth government =

Government of the Soviet Union

Rykov's Fifth government
- 6th government of the Soviet Union

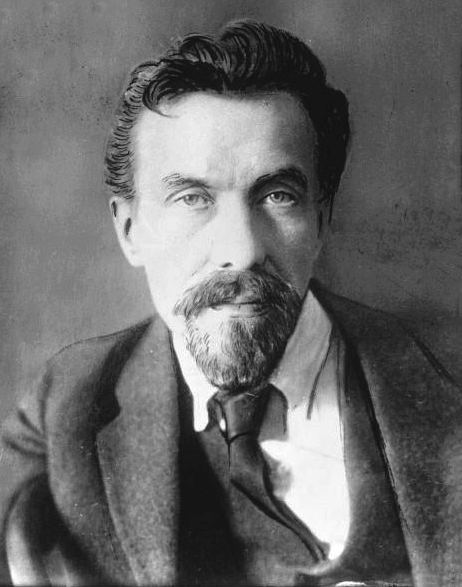
- Date formed: 29 May 1929
- Date dissolved: 19 December 1930

People and organisations
- Head of state: Mikhail Kalinin
- Head of government: Alexei Rykov
- Deputy head of government: Nikolai Gorbunov
- No. of ministers: 15

History
- Predecessor: Rykov IV
- Successor: Molotov I

The Fifth Rykov Government was the cabinet of the Soviet Union established on May 29, 1929, with Aleksei Rykov as the head of government, serving as the President of the Council of People's Commissars.

It ended on December 19, 1930, when the Central Executive Committee of the Soviet Union approved a new composition of the Sovnarkom.

== Composition ==
People's Commissar	Incumbent	Party
Chairman of the Council of People's Commissars of the Soviet Union	Aleksei Rykov	CPSU (b)
Administrator of Affairs of the Council of People's Commissars	Nikolai Gorbunov	CPSU (b)
Vice Chairmen of the Council of People's Commissars	Sergo Ordzhonikidze	CPSU (b)
Vice Chairmen of the Council of People's Commissars	Janis Rudzutaks	CPSU (b)
Vice Chairmen of the Council of People's Commissars	Valerian Kuibyshev	CPSU (b)
Vice Chairmen of the Council of People's Commissars	Vasili Schmidt	CPSU (b)
Vice Chairmen of the Council of People's Commissars	Andrei Andreev	CPSU (b)
People's Commissar for Foreign Affairs of the USSR	Georgy Chicherin	CPSU (b)
People's Commissar for War and Naval Affairs	Kliment Voroshilov	CPSU (b)
People's Commissar for External and Internal Trade	Anastas Mikoyan	CPSU (b)
People's Commissar for Supplies	Anastas Mikoyan	CPSU (b)
People's Commissar of Communication Routes of the Soviet Union	Janis Rudzutaks	CPSU (b)
People's Commissar for Posts and Telegraphs	Nikolai Antipov	CPSU (b)
Supreme Council of the National Economy	Valerian Kuibyshev	CPSU (b)
People's Commissar for Labor	Nikolai Uglanov	CPSU (b)
People's Commissar for Inspection of Workers and Peasants	Sergo Ordzhonikidze	CPSU (b)
People's Commissar for Finance	Nikolai Bryukhanov	CPSU (b)
