= Premier =

Title for heads of government

Premier is a title for the head of government in central governments, state governments and local governments of some countries. A second in command to a premier is designated as a deputy premier or vice premier.

A premier will normally be a head of government, but is not the head of state. In presidential systems, the two roles are often combined into one, whereas in parliamentary systems of government the two are usually kept separate.

== Relationship to the term "prime minister" ==
"Premier" is often the title of the heads of government in sub-national entities, such as the provinces and territories of Canada, states of the Commonwealth of Australia, provinces of South Africa, the island of Nevis within the Federation of Saint Kitts and Nevis. In some of these cases, the formal title remains "Prime Minister" but "Premier" is used to avoid confusion with the national leader. In these cases, care should be taken not to confuse the title of "premier" with "prime minister". In these countries, terms such as "Federal Premier", "National Premier" or "Premier of the Dominion" were sometimes used to refer to prime ministers, although these are now obsolete. In cases where "Premier" is applied to a national head of government, as in most socialist states however, the two terms are synonymous and may be used, at least colloquially, to refer to the same office.

== Etymology ==
The word comes from French premier ministre which means prime minister. Premier means 'first', coming from Latin prīmārius. This is why in many nations, "premier" is used interchangeably with "prime minister".

== Examples by country ==
Australia – "premier" is the official title for the heads of government in Australia's six states. The term "chief minister" is the title of the head of government in Australia's two self-governing territories, and is effectively equivalent to a premier.

Canada – "premier" is used for the heads of government in Canada's 13 Provinces and territories (see Premier (Canada)). "Premier ministre" is the French term for both the Prime Minister of the Canadian federal government and a provincial/territorial premier, so context and/or the office holder's name is needed to determine to which level of government one is referring. For example, the "premier ministre du Québec."

People's Republic of China – the head of government is officially titled the Premier of the State Council (see Premier of the People's Republic of China).

Taiwan – the head of government is officially the President of the Executive Yuan, but the officeholder is commonly referred to as the Premier (see Premier of the Republic of China).

Cayman Islands – the head of government is referred to as the “Premier”, however, as a British Overseas Territory, the British Monarch is the head of state, and the British government often has the last say on external affairs.

Bosnia and Herzegovina – "Premier" means the "Prime Minister". In the Federation of Bosnia and Herzegovina, a sub-national entity of Bosnia and Herzegovina, as well as in the cantons, the head of government has the formal title of "premier", often anglicized as "prime minister", while the national prime minister is Chairman of the Council of Ministers of Bosnia and Herzegovina, but "premier" is sometimes colloquially used.

Czechia – the head of government is colloquially called "Premiér", and the Czech language translates both "Premier" and "Prime Minister" as "Premiér". However, although his post is commonly translated in English as "Prime Minister", the official title as per articles 67 and 68 of the Constitution is "Předseda vlády", which literally translates as "President of the Government".

Croatia – the head of government is officially called "President of the Government" (predsjednik vlade) but "Premier" (premijer) is colloquially used.

Serbia – the head of government is officially called "President of the Government" (predsednik vlade) but "Premier" (premijer) is colloquially used.

Poland – the head of government is officially called "President of the Council of Ministers" (Polish: Prezes Rady Ministrów, lit. 'Chairman of the Council of Ministers') but "Premier" (polish for Prime Minister) is colloquially used.

Italy – the President of the Council of Ministers, an office equivalent to prime minister, is informally referred to as the "Premier".

North Macedonia – the head of the government is named premier (Macedonian премиер, premier), usually translated in English as prime minister.

USSR – the title of premier was applied to the Chairman of the Council of People's Commissars, which was renamed Chairman of the Council of Ministers in 1946 and replaced by the Prime Minister of the Soviet Union in 1991.

Malaysia – the head of the Sarawak state government is known as the Premier of Sarawak following a state constitutional amendment in 2022, a move widely seen to reflect the status of Sarawak as an equal partner with Sabah and Malaya in Malaysia as stipulated in the 1963 Malaysia Agreement (MA63).

Netherlands – the term premier is colloquially used as a synonym of prime minister. In the Dutch language, the official and also commonly used term is "minister president", so this is even a third synonym, but this is normally not translated literally into the English language.

== By jurisdiction ==
- Premiers of Australia
- Premier of Bermuda
- Premier of the British Virgin Islands
- Premiers of Canada
- Premier of the Cayman Islands
- Premier of the People's Republic of China
- List of premiers of China
- Chancellor of China
- Premier of North Korea
- Premier of Montserrat
- Premier of Sarawak
- Premiers of South Africa
- Premier of the Soviet Union
- Premier of the Republic of China (Taiwan)
- Premier of the Turks and Caicos Islands
- President of the Council of Ministers

== See also ==
- Westminster system
- Constitutional monarchy
- Semi-presidential system
- Semi-parliamentary system
- Parliamentary republic
- Parliamentary leader
