= All-Russian Council for Workers' Control =

The All-Russian Council for Workers' Control (Russian: Всероссийский совет рабочего контроля) was established by the Bolsheviks shortly after their seizure of power in 1917. It held two meetings on 28 November and 5 December 1917. At this second meeting it was dissolved into the Supreme Soviet of the National Economy (Vesenkha). It was composed of representatives of various state and labour organisations such as the All-Russian Central Executive Committee, the All-Russian Council of Trade Unions, the All-Russian Council of Factory Committees. It played a key role in determining the extent to which workers' control became a feature of the socio-economic make up of Russian society in the wake of the Russian Revolution.
