= Chairman of the Council of People's Commissars of the Soviet Union =

Title for the Head of the Soviet Union from 1923 to 1946

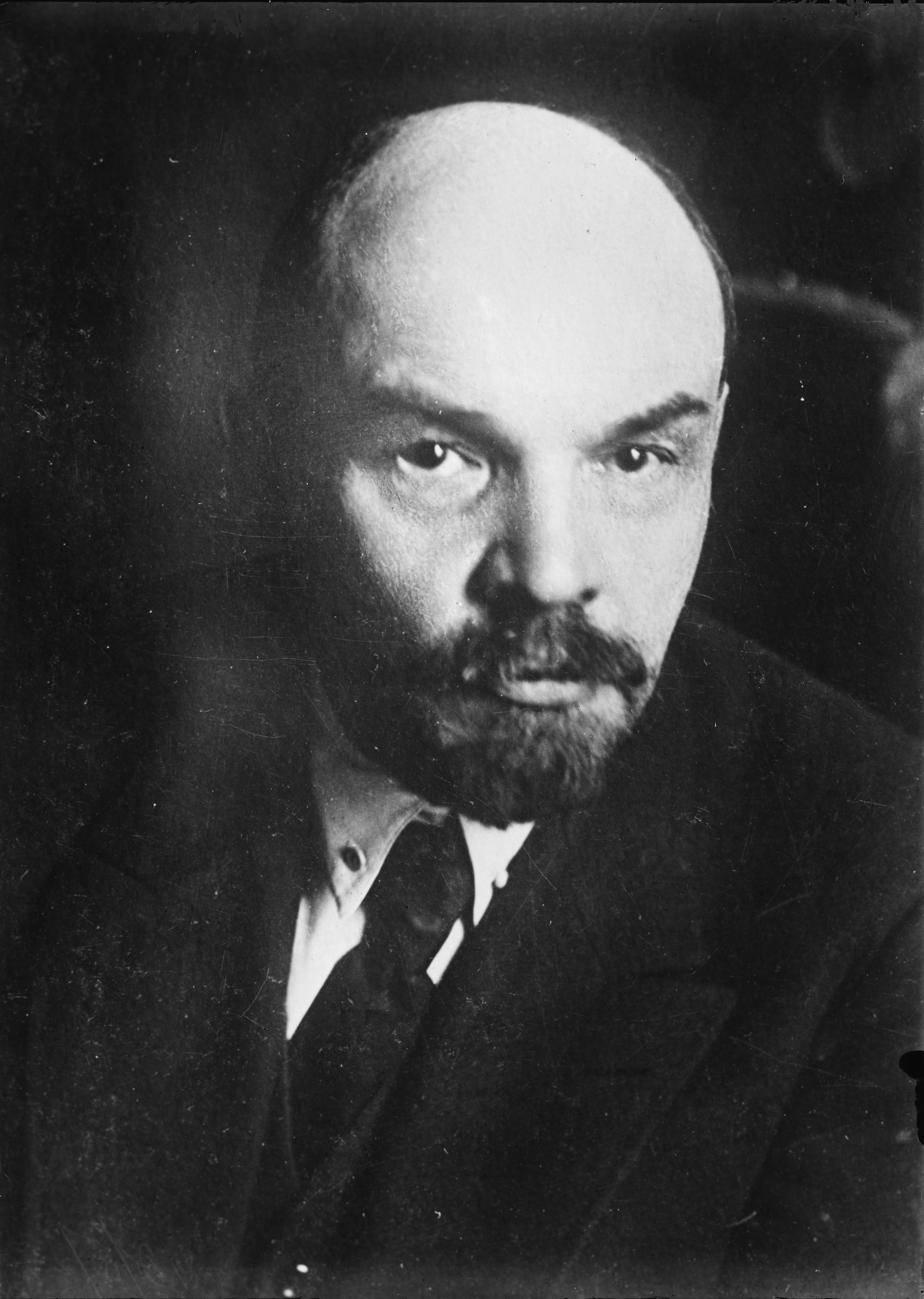
Vladimir Lenin, first chairman of the Council of People's Commissars of the Soviet Union

The chairman of the Council of People's Commissars of the Soviet Union was the head of government of the Soviet Union during the existence of the Council of People's Commissars of the Soviet Union from 1923 to 1946.

== History ==
The post of chair of the Council of People's Commissars of the Soviet Union – the head of the executive body of the Central Executive Committee of the Soviet Union – was established by the Treaty on the Formation of the Union of Soviet Socialist Republics, which entered into force after approval by the First Congress of Soviets at a meeting on 30 December 1922. The first chairman of the Council of People's Commissars of the Soviet Union was appointed to the post at the 2nd session of the Central Executive Committee of the Soviet Union on 6 July 1923.

=== 1923–1930 ===
The appointment of Vladimir Lenin to the post of the first chair of the Council of People's Commissars of the Soviet Union on 6 July 1923, was of purely symbolic significance, since Lenin's poor state of health did not allow him to actively engage in public affairs and since May 1923 he had been left without a break in the Gorky residence near Moscow under the supervision of doctors. Before the death of Lenin in 1924, the actual leadership of the Council of People's Commissars of the Soviet Union was carried out by Alexei Rykov.

Having replaced Lenin as head of government, Alexei Rykov actively pursued a New Economic Policy and in the late 1920s opposed its curtailment. Together with Nikolai Bukharin and Mikhail Tomsky, he opposed Stalin in a discussion about collectivization and against forcing industrialization, opposed the adoption of a five-year economic development planning system, which caused dissatisfaction with the party elite. Joseph Stalin told the writer Maxim Gorky: "We are thinking of changing Rykov, he is getting confused at the feet!", to which Rykov directly told Stalin: "Your policy does not smell like an economy!". In the fall of 1929, he publicly admitted his "mistakes", losing to Stalin.

According to Polish historian, Marian Kamil Dziewanowski, Rykov was placed in the position of chairman of the Soviet Union due to support from Stalin as part of a wider effort to build an alliance in the Politburo. Dziewanowski argued that Trotsky rather than Rykov would have been the natural successor to Lenin had he accepted the position of deputy chairman.

In 1924–1929, Rykov, simultaneously with the post of head of government of the Soviet Union, served as chairman of the Council of People's Commissars of the Russian Socialist Federative Soviet Republic. In December 1930, he was removed from the post of chairman of the Council of People's Commissars of the Soviet Union and was soon appointed People's Commissar of Posts and Telegraphs of the Soviet Union.

=== 1930–1941 ===
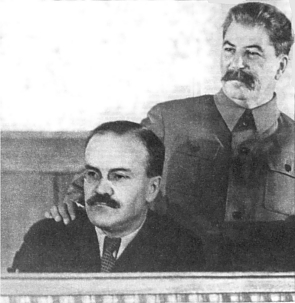
Joseph Stalin with Vyacheslav Molotov

The place of Alexey Rykov as chairman of the Council of People's Commissars of the Soviet Union was taken by Vyacheslav Molotov, who held this position for the longest term (more than 10 years) and combined the post of head of government with other positions: chairman of the Council of Labor and Defense, Defense Committee, Economic Council under the Council People's Commissars of the Soviet Union, and since 1939 – People's Commissar of Foreign Affairs of the Soviet Union.

[Molotov] was greatly influenced by the fact that he lost his support. The new deputy chairmen of the Council of People's Commissars (Mikoyan, Bulganin, Kaganovich, Voznesensky) were Stalin's loyal associates. Most of the decisions of the Council of People's Commissars were previously discussed by Stalin's inner circle at his dacha. And I know for sure that people from Kaganovich's apparatus followed every step of Molotov and his assistants. Those, however, soon began to answer them the same.

— from the memoirs of Mikhail Smirtyukov, assistant to the deputy chairman of the Council of People's Commissars of the Soviet Union

On 6 May 1941, Molotov was relieved of his post as chairman of the Council of People's Commissars of the Soviet Union, taking the post of deputy head of government. The official reason for Molotov's resignation was his many requests, motivated by the difficulty to fulfill the duties of head of government along with the duties of the People's Commissar of Foreign Affairs. According to some historians, the real reasons for the removal of Molotov from the leadership of the government were Joseph Stalin's personal dislike and the latter's decision to take the post of chairman of the Council of People's Commissars of the Soviet Union to concentrate the party and executive state power in a difficult international situation on the eve of Germany's invasion of the Soviet Union.

=== 1941–1946 ===
During the Great Patriotic War, from 30 June 1941, to 4 September 1945, all power in the Soviet Union belonged to the State Defense Committee of the Soviet Union under the leadership of Joseph Stalin, who during this period combined the position of chairman of the State Defense Committee of the Soviet Union with posts chairman of the Council of People's Commissars of the Soviet Union and people's commissar of defense. During the war, the activities of the People's Commissariats of the Soviet Union were subordinate to the State Committee of Defense of the Soviet Union, which did not have its own apparatus and relied on the administrative resources of the People's Commissariats.

By a decree of the State Defense Committee on 15 October 1941, the Council of People's Commissars of the Soviet Union, together with other bodies of state power and administration, was evacuated to the city of Kuibyshev, however, Joseph Stalin, being the chairman of the State Committee of Defense of the Soviet Union and the Headquarters of the Supreme High Command, remained in Moscow.

In 1946, in connection with the transformation of the Council of People's Commissars of the Soviet Union into the Council of Ministers of the Soviet Union, the post of head of the government of the Soviet Union was changed to chairman of the Council of Ministers of the Soviet Union.

== List of chairmen and their deputies ==
Here are lists of chairmen of the Council of People's Commissars of the Soviet Union, first deputies and deputy chairmen of the Council of People's Commissars of the Soviet Union. The list of chairmen of the Council of People's Commissars of the Soviet Union is given in chronological order. For each chairman, alphabetical lists of his first deputies and deputies are given. Dates of a person's position are indicated in parentheses.

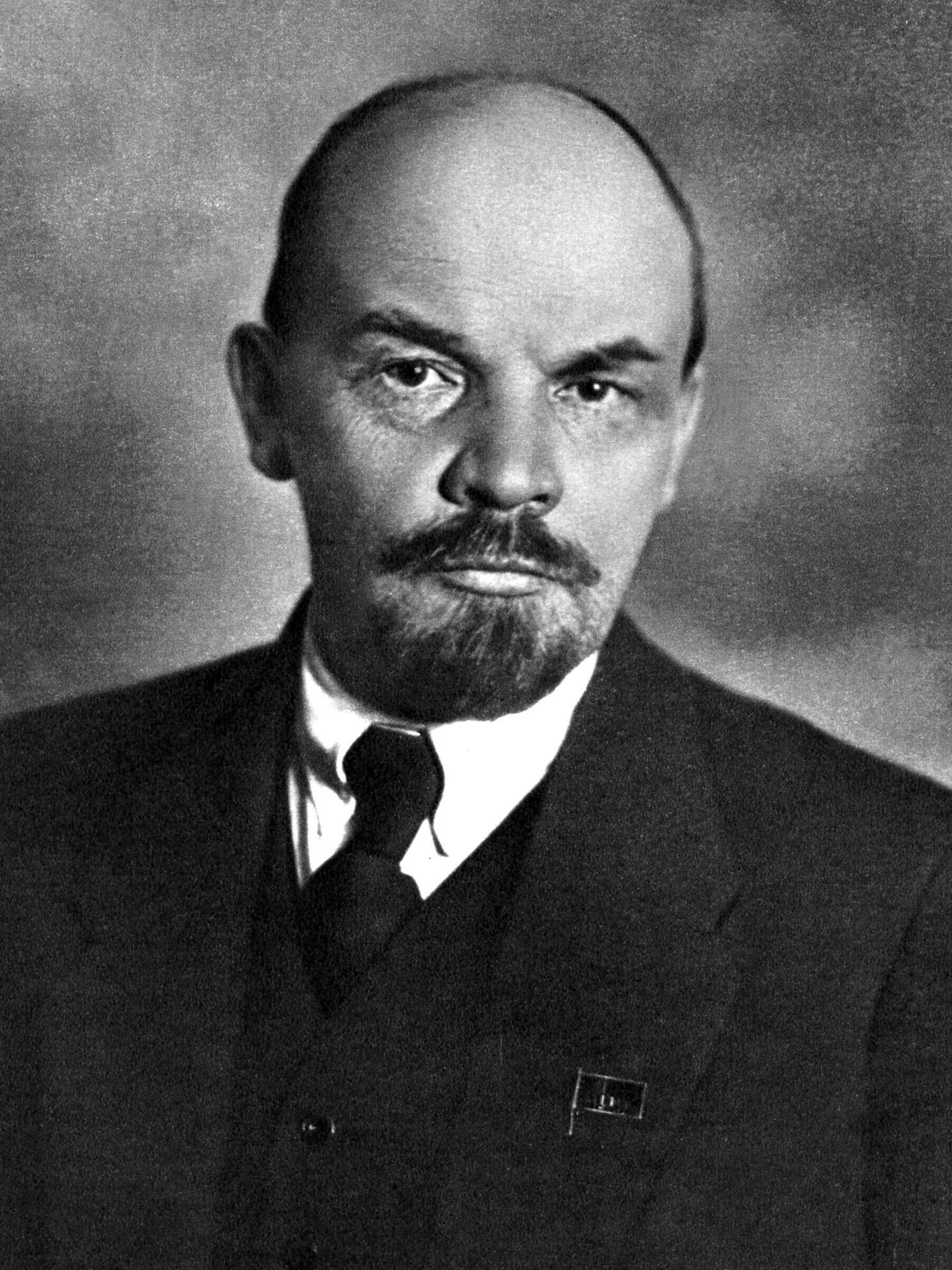
Government of Lenin (1923–1924)
№	Chairman	Deputy Chairmen
1	Vladimir Lenin (6 July 1923 – 21 January 1924)	Lev Kamenev (6 July 1923 – 16 January 1926); Mamia Orakhelashvili (6 July 1923 – 21 May 1925); Alexei Rykov (6 July 1923 – 2 February 1924); Alexander Tsiurupa (6 July 1923 – 8 May 1928); Vlas Chubar (6 July 1923 – 21 May 1925)

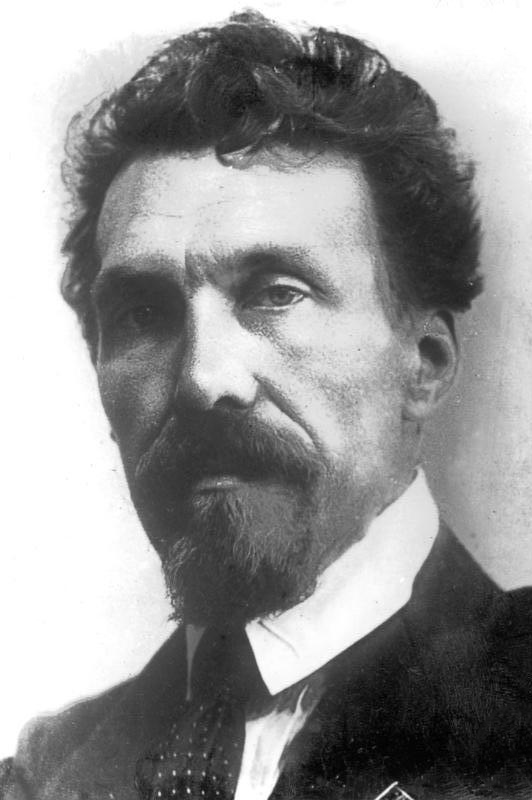
Government of Rykov (1924–1930)
№	Chairman	Deputy Chairmen
2	Alexei Rykov (2 February 1924 – 19 December 1930)
2	Alexei Rykov (2 February 1924 – 19 December 1930)	Lev Kamenev (6 July 1923 – 16 January 1926); Valerian Kuybyshev (16 January 1926 – 5 November 1926, 10 November 1930 – 14 May 1934); Mamia Orakhelashvili (6 July 1923 – 21 May 1925); Sergo Ordzhonikidze (5 November 1926 – 10 November 1930); Jānis Rudzutaks (16 January 1926 – 25 May 1937); Alexander Tsiurupa (6 July 1923 – 8 May 1928); Vlas Chubar (6 July 1923 – 21 May 1925); Vasily Schmidt (11 August 1928 – 1 December 1930)

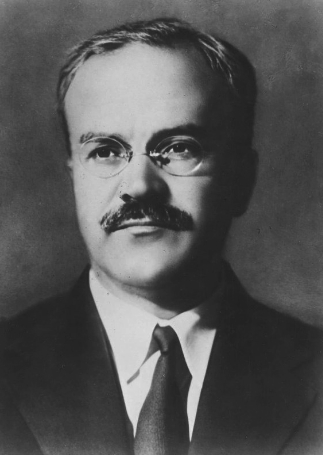
Government of Molotov (1930–1941)
№	Chairman	First Deputy Chairmen
3	Vyacheslav Molotov (19 December 1930 – 6 May 1941)	Nikolai Voznesensky (10 March 1941 – 15 March 1946); Valerian Kuybyshev (14 May 1934 – 25 January 1935)
3	Vyacheslav Molotov (19 December 1930 – 6 May 1941)	Deputy Chairmen
3	Vyacheslav Molotov (19 December 1930 – 6 May 1941)	Andrey Andreev (22 December 1930 – 9 October 1931); Nikolay Antipov (27 April 1935 – 21 June 1937); Lavrentiy Beria (3 February 1941 – 15 March 1946); Nikolai Bulganin (16 September 1938 – 15 May 1944); Nikolai Voznesensky (4 April 1939 – 10 March 1941); Kliment Voroshilov (7 May 1940 – 15 March 1946); Andrey Vyshinsky (31 May 1939 – 15 May 1944); Rosalia Zemlyachka (8 May 1939 – 26 August 1943); Lazar Kaganovich (21 August 1938 – 15 May 1944); Stanislav Kosior (19 January 1938 – 3 May 1938); Alexei Kosygin (17 April 1940 – 15 March 1946); Valerian Kuybyshev (10 November 1930 – 14 May 1934); Vyacheslav Malyshev (17 April 1940 – 15 May 1944); Valery Mezhlauk (25 April 1934 – 25 February 1937, 17 October 1937 – 1 December 1937); Lev Mekhlis (6 September 1940 – 15 May 1944); Anastas Mikoyan (22 July 1937 – 15 March 1946); Mikhail Pervukhin (17 April 1940 – 15 May 1944); Jānis Rudzutaks (16 January 1926 – 25 May 1937); Maksim Saburov (10 March 1941 – 15 May 1944); Vlas Chubar (24 April 1934 – 4 July 1938)

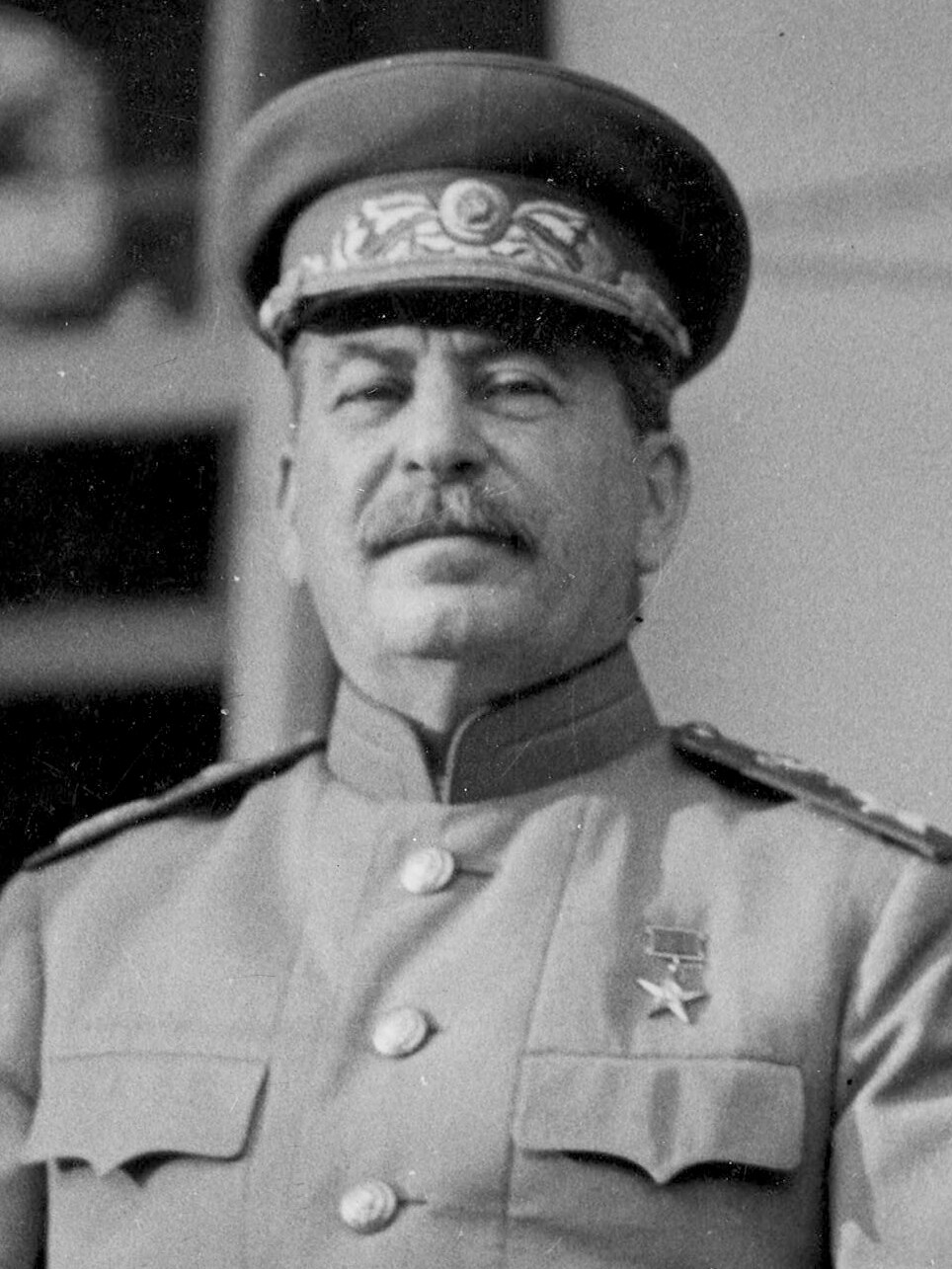
Government of Stalin (1941–1946)
№	Chairman	First Deputy Chairmen
4	Joseph Stalin (6 May 1941 – 15 March 1946)	Nikolai Voznesensky (10 March 1941 – 15 March 1946); Vyacheslav Molotov (16 August 1942 – 15 March 1946)
4	Joseph Stalin (6 May 1941 – 15 March 1946)	Deputy Chairmen
4	Joseph Stalin (6 May 1941 – 15 March 1946)	Lavrentiy Beria (3 February 1941 – 15 March 1946); Nikolai Bulganin (16 September 1938 – 15 May 1944); Kliment Voroshilov (7 May 1940 – 15 March 1946); Andrey Vyshinsky (31 May 1939 – 15 May 1944); Rosalia Zemlyachka (8 May 1939 – 26 August 1943); Lazar Kaganovich (21 August 1938 – 15 May 1944, 20 December 1944 – 15 March 1946); Alexei Kosygin (17 April 1940 – 15 March 1946); Georgy Malenkov (15 May 1944 – 15 March 1946); Vyacheslav Malyshev (17 April 1940 – 15 May 1944); Lev Mekhlis (6 September 1940 – 15 May 1944); Anastas Mikoyan (22 July 1937 – 15 March 1946); Vyacheslav Molotov (6 May 1941 – 16 August 1942); Mikhail Pervukhin (17 April 1940 – 15 May 1944); Maksim Saburov (10 March 1941 – 15 May 1944)

== See also ==
- Council of People's Commissars of the Soviet Union
- Premier of the Soviet Union
