= Mikhail Smirtyukov =

Soviet bureaucrat (1909–2004)

- Михаил Смиртюков

6th Managing Director of the Council of Ministers of the Soviet Union
- In office December 18, 1964 – July 17, 1989
- Premier: Alexei Kosygin; Nikolai Tikhonov; Nikolai Ryzhkov
- Preceded by: Georgy Stepanov
- Succeeded by: Mikhail Shkabardnya

Personal details
- Born: September 13, 1909 Govorenki, Russian Empire
- Died: December 26, 2004 (aged 95) Moscow, Russia
- Resting place: Novodevichy Cemetery, Moscow
- Party: All–Union Communist Party (Bolsheviks) since 1940
- Education: Moscow State University (1931)
- Profession: Jurist
- Awards: List: Hero of Socialist Labour; Order of Lenin; Order of the October Revolution; Order of the Red Banner; Order of the Patriotic War; Order of the Red Banner of Labour; Medal "In Commemoration of the 100th Anniversary of the Birth of Vladimir Ilyich Lenin"; Medal "For the Defense of Leningrad"; Medal "For the Defense of Moscow"; Medal "For the Victory over Germany in the Great Patriotic War of 1941–1945"; Anniversary Medal "Twenty Years of Victory in the Great Patriotic War of 1941–1945"; Anniversary Medal "Thirty Years of Victory in the Great Patriotic War of 1941–1945"; Anniversary Medal "Forty Years of Victory in the Great Patriotic War of 1941–1945"; Anniversary Medal "50 Years of Victory in the Great Patriotic War of 1941–1945"; Zhukov Medal; Anniversary Medal "60 Years of Victory in the Great Patriotic War of 1941–1945"; Medal "In Memory of the 850th Anniversary of Moscow"; Medal "In Memory of the 300th Anniversary of Saint Petersburg"; Medal "For the Victory over Japan"; Medal "Veteran of Labour"; Anniversary Medal "50 Years of the Armed Forces of the Soviet Union"; Anniversary Medal "60 Years of the Armed Forces of the Soviet Union"; Anniversary Medal "70 Years of the Armed Forces of the Soviet Union"; Medal "In Memory of the 800th Anniversary of Moscow"; Medal "In Memory of the 250th Anniversary of Leningrad"

Military service
- Battles/wars: World War II; Eastern Front

Mikhail Sergeyevich Smirtyukov (Russian: Михаил Сергеевич Смиртюков; September 13, 1909 – December 26, 2004) was a Soviet bureaucrat.

He became a member of the Communist Party of the Soviet Union in 1940, a member of the Central Committee (1981–1990, candidate since 1976), a member of the Central Audit Commission (1971–1976), and a member of the Supreme Council of the Soviet Union (1966–1989).

== Biography ==
Smirtyukov was born into a peasant family in the village of Gorovenki, and after Lenin's death, joined the Communist Youth League in response to the Lenin Enrolment.

Between 1924 and 1927, he became the secretary of the village council, the secretary of the village cooperative, and the head of the club. In the spring of 1927, he graduated from high school.

He graduated from the faculty of Soviet law of Moscow State University, where he studied in 1927–1931.

In October 1930, he worked in the apparatus of the Council of People's Commissars of the Soviet Union, where he started out as a senior assistant, consultant, head of sector, and Assistant Secretary of the Economic Council. He eventually became Deputy Head of the Secretariat of the Council of People's Commissars of the Union and assistant to the authorized State Defense Committee for the Supply of the Red Army Anastas Mikoyan in 1941. Smirtyukov continued to climb his way up, becoming the Deputy Head of the Secretariat of the Council of Ministers in March 1946.

Smirtyukov became the Deputy Manager of the Council of Ministers of the Soviet Union in 1953 and the managing director of the Council of Ministers of the Soviet Union in December 1964.

Among the members of the Political Bureau, he was the only one who was sent the most confidential orders of the highest governing body in the country, and the secretaries and heads of departments of the Central Committee of the Communist Party of the Soviet Union were asked to coordinate the most important plans and resolutions with him.

From July 1989, he was a personal pensioner of national importance; in 1989–1990, he was an adviser to the manager of affairs of the Council of Ministers of the Soviet Union Mikhail Shkabardnya.

He is buried in Novodevichy Cemetery (3rd section, 1st row).

== Family ==
Wife – Smirtyukova Vera Fyodorovna (1908–1980), Doctor of Medical Sciences.

== Awards and commemoration ==
- Hero of Socialist Labour (September 12, 1979);
- The Four Orders of Lenin (March 7, 1943; September 12, 1969; September 12, 1979; September 12, 1984);
- Order of the October Revolution (December 8, 1971);
- Order of the Red Banner (August 3, 1944);
- Two Orders of the Patriotic War of the 1st Degree (November 6, 1945; March 11, 1985);
- Two Orders of the Red Banner of Labour (April 23, 1942; September 12, 1959);
- Medals;
- A plaque in the Khobulzanov alley on the house where he lived.

== Compositions ==
- Soviet State Administration Apparatus: Questions of the Organization and Activity of Central Bodies – 2nd Edition, Revised and Enlarged – Moscow: Publishing House of Political Literature, 1984 – 287 Pages

== Sources ==
- Smirtyukov, Mikhail Sergeevich. Site "Heroes of the Country"
- Smirtyukov Mikhail Sergeevich – article from the Great Soviet Encyclopedia
- Biographies
- Moscow Graves. Mikhail Smirtyukov, Photography, Smirtyukov Mikhail Sergeevich (1909–2004)
- Zhirnov, Evgeny (2011). "The State is Him: The Life Story of Mikhail Smirtyukov – a Man Who Worked 60 years in the Kremlin, Told by Himself". Коммерсантъ. 33 (937). Kommersant Power.
