= Council of People's Commissars of the Soviet Union =

Highest body of the executive Soviet authority from 1923 to 1946

- Совет народных комиссаров Советского Союза
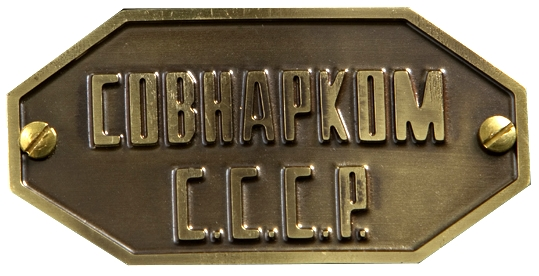

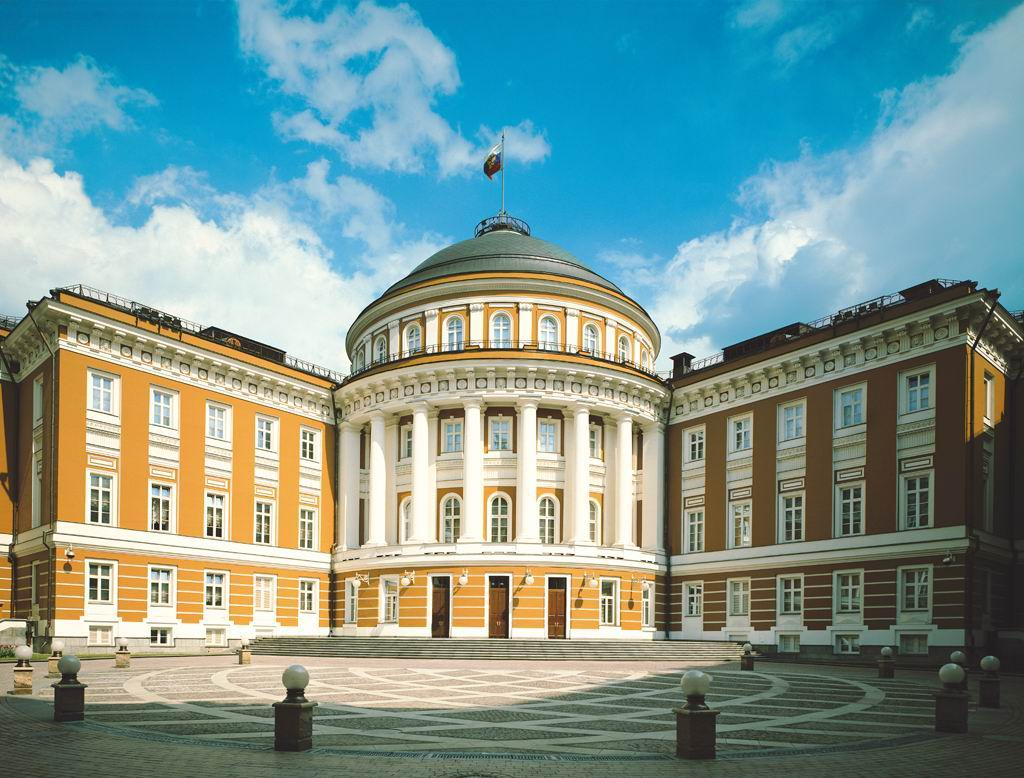
- The building of the Kremlin Senate, which housed the secretariat of the Chairman of the Council of People's Commissars of the Soviet Union

Agency overview
- Formed: July 6, 1923
- Preceding agency: Council of People's Commissars of the Russian Soviet Federative Socialist Republic (acting)
- Dissolved: March 15, 1946
- Superseding agency: Council of Ministers of the Soviet Union
- Jurisdiction: Soviet Union
- Headquarters: Kremlin, Moscow, Soviet Union
- Agency executives: Vladimir Lenin (first); Joseph Stalin (last)
- Parent agency: Central Executive Committee of the Soviet Union, Supreme Soviet of the Soviet Union

The Council of People's Commissars of the Soviet Union was the highest executive and administrative organ of state authority of the Soviet Union from 1923 to 1946.

As the government of the Soviet Union, the Council of People's Commissars of the Soviet Union and the People's Commissariats led by it played a key role in such significant events for the country and society as the economic recovery after the Civil War, the New Economic Policy, agricultural collectivization, electrification, industrialization, five-year plans for the development of national economy, censorship, the fight against religion, repression and political persecution, the Gulag, the deportation of peoples, the annexation of the Baltic States and other territories by the Soviet Union, the organization of the partisan movement, the organization of industrial production in the rear during the Great Patriotic War.

In 1946, it was transformed into the Council of Ministers of the Soviet Union.

== History ==
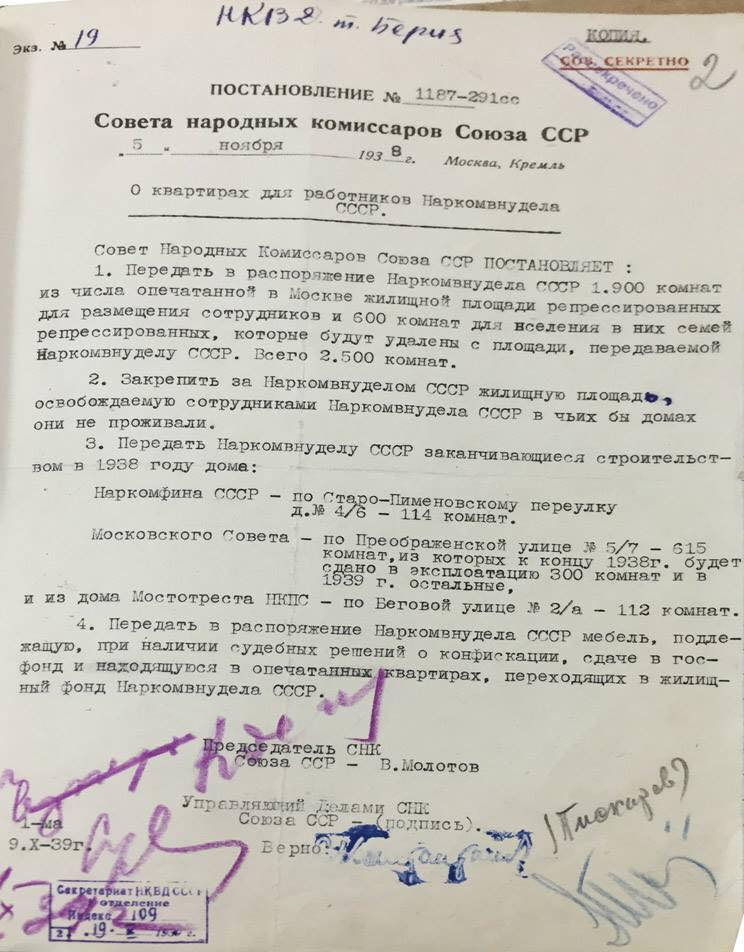
Example of order issued by the Council of People's Commissars on November 5, 1938 signed by its chairman Molotov

The creation of the Council of People's Commissars of the Soviet Union as the executive body of the Central Executive Committee of the Soviet Union was provided for by the Treaty on the Creation of the Soviet Union. For the first time the abbreviation "Sovnarkom" was used in this treaty.

Leon Trotsky had originally suggested Lenin's government be named Council of People's Commissars.

The prototype of the Council of People's Commissars of the Soviet Union was the Council of People's Commissars of Soviet Russia – the first in the history of the Soviet state a panel of chairmen of commissions entrusted with "managing certain branches of state life". Formed by the decrees of the 2nd All-Russian Congress of Soviets and the All-Russian Central Executive Committee on November 9, 1917, five years before the formation of the Soviet Union, the Council of People's Commissars chaired by Vladimir Lenin was the government of the Russian Soviet Republic (since 1918 – the Russian Soviet Federative Socialist Republic). After the formation of the Soviet Union, the Council of People's Commissars of the Russian Soviet Federative Socialist Republic coordinated the activities of the Soviet republics that became part of the Soviet Union, actually becoming the first government of the Soviet Union between the signing of the Treaty on the Creation of the Soviet Union on December 29, 1922, and the formation of the Council of People's Commissars of the Soviet Union on July 6, 1923.

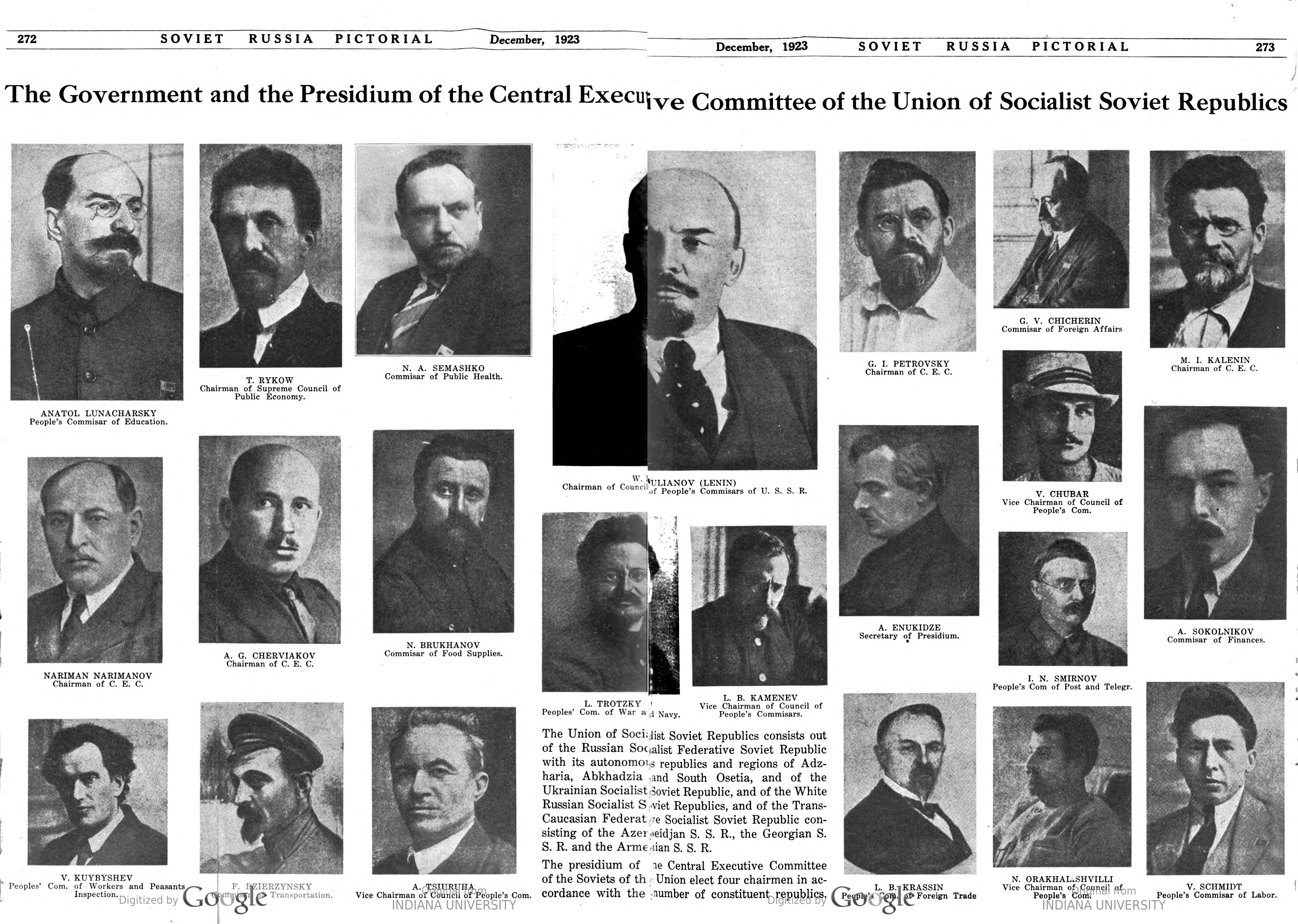
Soviet Russia Pictorial, December 1923

The first composition of the Council of People's Commissars of the Soviet Union was approved at the 2nd session of the Central Executive Committee of the Soviet Union on July 6, 1923:

- Chairman – Vladimir Lenin;
- Vice-chairmen: Lev Kamenev, Alexei Rykov, Alexander Tsiurupa, Vlas Chubar, Sergo Ordzhonikidze, Mamia Orakhelashvili;
- People's Commissars of the All-Union People's Commissars: for foreign affairs – Georgy Chicherin, for military and maritime affairs – Leon Trotsky, foreign trade – Leonid Krasin, communications – Felix Dzerzhinsky, posts and telegraphs – Ivan Smirnov;
- People's Commissars of the United People's Commissars: the Supreme Council of the National Economy – Alexei Rykov, food – Nikolai Bryukhanov, labor – Vasily Schmidt, finance – Grigori Sokolnikov, Workers' and Peasants' Inspection – Valerian Kuybyshev.

On July 17, 1923, the Council of People's Commissars of the Soviet Union notified the Central Executive Committees of the Union Republics and their Councils of People's Commissars that the Council of People's Commissars of the Soviet Union had begun to fulfill the tasks entrusted to it.

In the Constitution of the Soviet Union of 1924, the Council of People's Commissars of the Soviet Union was defined as the executive and administrative body of the Central Executive Committee of the Soviet Union, and with the adoption of the Constitution of the Soviet Union of 1936, it received an alternative name – the Government of the Soviet Union – and became the highest executive and administrative body management of the Soviet Union.

During the Great Patriotic War, the activities of the people's commissariats of the Soviet Union were subordinated to the State Defense Committee – an emergency management body under the leadership of Joseph Stalin, Chairman of the Council of People's Commissars of the Soviet Union, which was created during the war and had full power in the Soviet Union.

On March 15, 1946, the Council of People's Commissars of the Soviet Union was transformed into the Council of Ministers of the Soviet Union by decree of the Presidium of the Supreme Soviet. The law on the transformation of the federal government also provided for the renaming of the federal bodies subordinate to the Government of the Soviet Union. Accordingly, the people's commissariats of the Soviet Union were renamed the Ministries of the Soviet Union, and the people's commissars into ministers. On the same day, the Council of People's Commissars resigned to the Supreme Soviet of the Soviet Union of a new convocation, and after 4 days, the Council of Ministers was formed in accordance with law. On February 25, 1947, appropriate changes were made to the Constitution of the Soviet Union.

== Composition ==
The Council of People's Commissars of the Soviet Union consisted of the following members:

- Chairman of the Council of People's Commissars of the Soviet Union;
- Deputy Chairman of the Council of People's Commissars of the Soviet Union;
- The people's commissars of the Soviet Union – the leaders of the people's commissariats of the Soviet Union;
- Chairman of the State Planning Commission of the Soviet Union (since 1936);
- Chairman of the Soviet Control Commission (since 1936);
- Chairman of the Procurement Committee (since 1936);
- Chairman of the Committee on Arts (since 1936);
- Chairman of the Committee for Higher Education (since 1936).

The Council of People's Commissars of the Soviet Union also included, with an advisory vote, representatives of the republics of the Soviet Union, members of the Central Executive Committee of the Soviet Union, chairman of the Joint State Political Directorate and manager of the Central Statistical Directorate. In addition, chairmen of the Council of People's Commissars of the Union Republics and, by special resolution of the Council of People's Commissars of the Soviet Union, other persons were allowed to participate in meetings of the Council of People's Commissars of the Soviet Union.

Throughout the activities of the Council of People's Commissars of the Soviet Union, the number and names of government bodies changed several times due to the creation of new institutions and the separation, merger and abolition of previously created ones. The composition of the Council of People's Commissars of the Soviet Union was changed accordingly.

== Subordination ==
According to the 1924 Constitution of the Soviet Union, the Council of People's Commissars of the Soviet Union was subordinate to the Central Executive Committee of the Soviet Union and its Presidium, which had the right to suspend and repeal the decrees and orders of the Council of People's Commissars, as well as the orders of the People's Commissars of the Soviet Union, with the apparent discrepancy of the order of the Union Constitution, legislation of the Soviet Union or the legislation of the Union Republic. Since 1938, the Council of People's Commissars of the Soviet Union was formed by the Supreme Council of the Soviet Union and was accountable to it (and in the intervals between sessions – to the Presidium of the Supreme Council of the Soviet Union).

== Authority ==
The Council of People's Commissars of the Soviet Union, within the limits of the rights granted to it and on the basis of the Statute on the Council of People's Commissars of the Soviet Union, had the following powers:

- The publication of decrees and resolutions binding on the entire territory of the Soviet Union;
- Consideration at its meetings of decrees and resolutions introduced by both individual commissariats of the Soviet Union and the Central Executive Committees of the Union republics and their presidiums;
- Development of regulations on people's commissariats, which entered into force after approval by the Central Executive Committee of the Soviet Union;
- Appointment of members of colleges – advisory and administrative bodies at the people's commissariats of the Soviet Union;
- Cancellation of orders of individual commissariats of the Soviet Union;
- The union and direction of the work of the All-Union and All-Republican People's Commissariats;
- The adoption of measures to implement the national economic plan and the state budget;
- Strengthening the monetary system;
- Ensuring public order;
- Implementation of general leadership in the field of foreign relations with foreign countries.

The Council of People's Commissars of the Soviet Union did not have the authority to appoint and dismiss the People's Commissars of the Soviet Union and their deputies, members of the collegiums of the Union People's Commissariats, as well as the leaders of a number of bodies under the Council of People's Commissars of the Soviet Union. This right belonged to the Presidium of the Central Executive Committee of the Soviet Union, and from 1936 to the Presidium of the Supreme Soviet of the Soviet Union, which exercised this right between sessions of the Supreme Soviet of the Soviet Union and subsequently submitted for approval by the Supreme Soviet of the Soviet Union. However, the chairman of the Council of People's Commissars of the Soviet Union was given the right to select and submit candidates for approval.

=== Relations with republican authorities ===
Each federal and autonomous republic had its own governments – republican councils of people's commissars – formed by the Central Executive Committee (since 1938 the Supreme Council) of the respective union or autonomous republic. Republican governments were not legally subordinate to the Council of People's Commissars of the Soviet Union, but they were obliged in their activities to be guided by the decrees and decisions of the All-Union Council of People's Commissars. At the same time, the union-republican commissariats of the republican councils of the people's commissioners had double subordination – they simultaneously submitted to the council of the people's commissars of the union republic, within the framework of which they were created, and to the corresponding all-republic people's commissariat of the Soviet Union, orders and instructions which should have been guided in their activities. In contrast to the union republican people's commissariats of the union republic, the republican people's commissariats were subordinate only to the council of the people's commissars of the corresponding union republic.

== Governing bodies ==
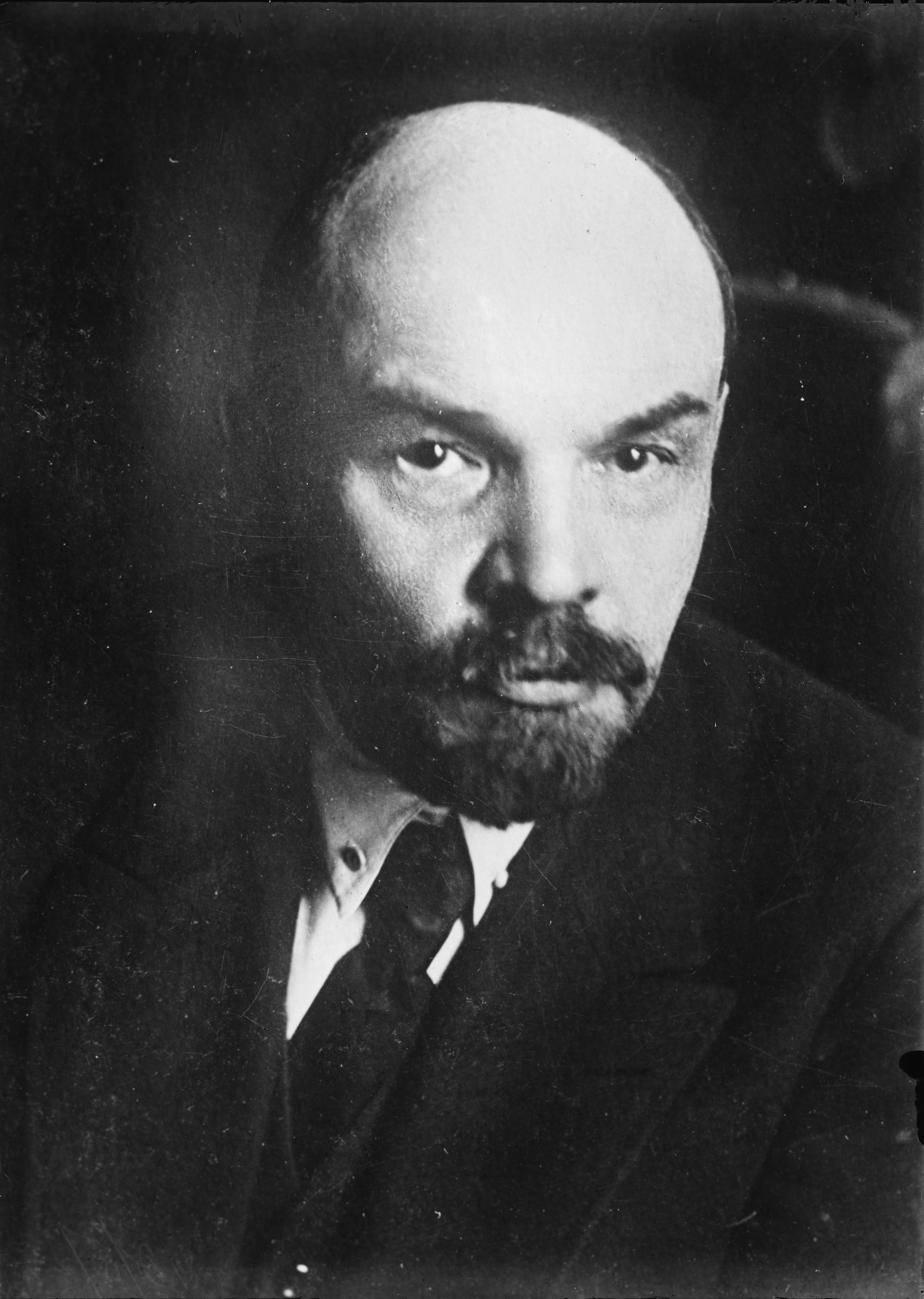
Vladimir Lenin, first chairman of the Council of People's Commissars of the Soviet Union

=== Chairman of the Council of People's Commissars of the Soviet Union ===
Chairman of the Council of People's Commissars of the Soviet Union was the head of the Soviet government. The appointment to the post of chairman was carried out with the approval of the composition of the government at the session of the Central Executive Committee of the Soviet Union (since 1938 – the Supreme Soviet of the Soviet Union).

Chairmen of the Council of People's Commissars of the Soviet Union

- Vladimir Lenin (July 6, 1923 – January 21, 1924);
- Alexei Rykov (February 2, 1924 – December 19, 1930);
- Vyacheslav Molotov (December 19, 1930 – May 6, 1941);
- Joseph Stalin (May 6, 1941 – March 15, 1946).

Under the chairman of the Council of People's Commissars of the Soviet Union, there was a staff of his deputies.

=== Administration of the Council of People's Commissars of the Soviet Union ===
Managers of the Council of People's Commissars of the Soviet Union

- Nikolai Gorbunov (July 17, 1923 – December 29, 1930);
- Platon Kerzhentsev (December 29, 1930 – March 23, 1933);
- Ivan Miroshnikov (March 23, 1933 – March 29, 1937);
- Mikhail Arbuzov (March 29, 1937 – July 31, 1937);
- Nikolay Petrunichev (July 31, 1937 – November 5, 1938);
- Ivan Bolshakov (December 17, 1938 – June 4, 1939);
- Mikhail Khlomov (June 10, 1939 – November 14, 1940);
- Yakov Chadayev (November 14, 1940 – March 15, 1946).

== People's Commissariats ==
The Council of People's Commissars of the Soviet Union was formed from the leaders of the central bodies of state administration – the people's commissars of the Soviet Union.

According to the Constitution of 1924, the people's commissariats of the Soviet Union were divided into all-union and united. All-Union People's Commissariats had authorized representatives in the republics, who were directly subordinate to the Allied People's Commissariats. United People's Commissariats acted through a network of like-minded people's commissariats of the Union republics, which fulfilled the tasks of the corresponding union people's commissariat.

Since 1936, the people's commissariats of the Soviet Union began to be subdivided into all-union and union-republican ones. Also changed the order of their activities. All-Union People's Commissars managed the branch of state administration entrusted to them throughout the entire Soviet Union directly or through the organs appointed by them, while the All-Republican People's Commissariats of the Soviet Union operated, as a rule, through the same-named People's Commissariats of the Union Republics and managed only a certain limited number of activities directly according to the list approved by the Presidium of the Supreme Soviet of the Soviet Union.

== Subordinate bodies ==
The Council of People's Commissars of the Soviet Union had the right to create, reorganize and abolish subordinate institutions, which were directly subordinate to the Council of People's Commissars of the Soviet Union.

== Official publications ==
- The newspaper "Izvestia" – in different years of the Council of People's Commissars of the Soviet Union, was published under various names:
  - "Proceedings of the Central Executive Committee of the Soviet Union and the All-Russian Central Executive Committee of the Soviets of Workers, Peasants, Red Army and Cossack Deputies" (News of the Central Executive Committee and the All-Russian Central Executive Committee, 1923–1938);
  - "Proceedings of the Soviets of Workers of the Soviet Union" (1938–1946);
- "Bulletin of the Central Executive Committee, the Council of People's Commissars and the Council of Labor and Defense of the Soviet Union" (1923–1924);
- "Collection of laws and regulations of the Workers' and Peasants' Government of the Soviet Union" (1924–1938);
- "Collection of decrees and orders of the Government of the Soviet Union" (1938–1946).

== See also ==
- Government of the Soviet Union
- Council of Ministers of the Soviet Union
- Council of Labor and Defense
