= Platon Kerzhentsev =

Soviet politician, diplomat and theatre and art critic

- Платон Керженцев
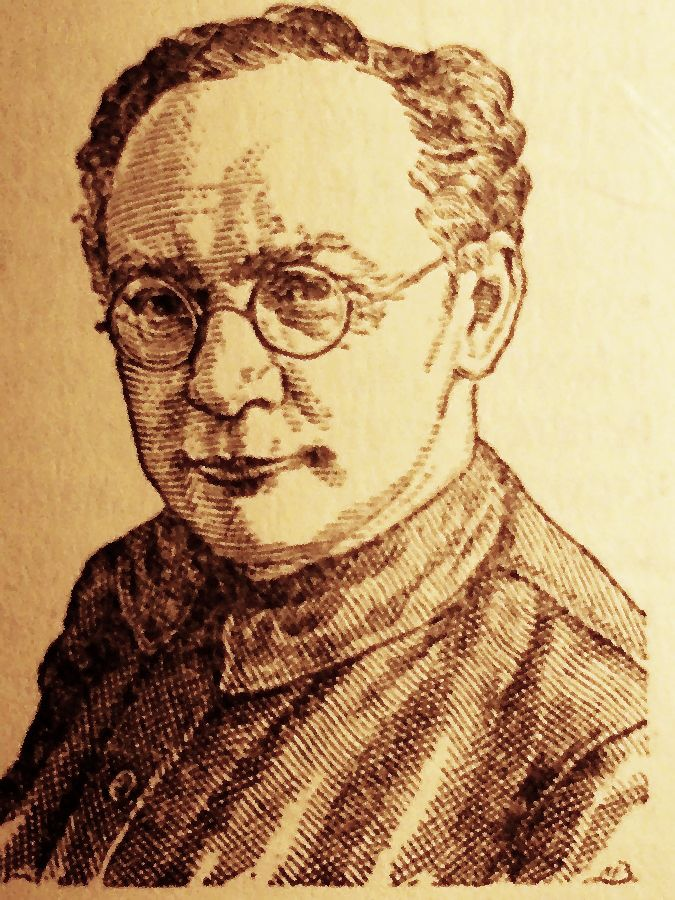
- Portrait, 1935

Administrator of Affairs of the Council of People's Commissars of the Soviet Union
- In office 29 December 1930 – 23 March 1933
- Premier: Vyacheslav Molotov
- Preceded by: Nikolai Gorbunov
- Succeeded by: Ivan Miroshnikov

Chairman of the Committee on Arts Affairs under the Council of People's Commissars of the Soviet Union
- In office 17 January 1936 – 15 January 1938
- Premier: Vyacheslav Molotov
- Preceded by: Office established
- Succeeded by: Alexey Nazarov

Personal details
- Born: Platon Mikhailovich Lebedev; 4 August 1881 Moscow, Russian Empire
- Died: 2 June 1940 (aged 58) Moscow, Russian SFSR, Soviet Union
- Citizenship: Soviet
- Party: Russian Social Democratic Labour Party (Bolsheviks) (1904–1918); All-Union Communist Party (Bolsheviks) (1918–1937)
- Profession: Literary and theatre critic, historian, art theorist
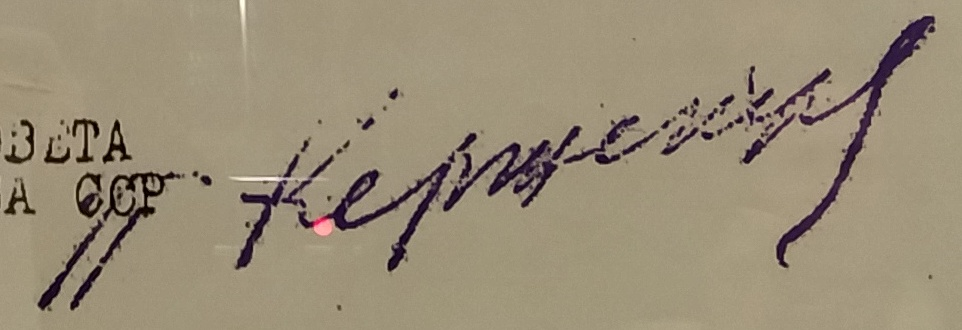
- Signature

Platon Mikhailovich Kerzhentsev (Russian: Плато́н Миха́йлович Ке́рженцев), (real name Lebedev (Ле́бедев), pseudonym V. Kerzhentsev; 4 August 1881 – 2 June 1940) was a Soviet state and party official, revolutionary, diplomat, journalist, historian, playwright and theatre and arts theorist who was involved with the Proletkult movement.

From 29 December 1930 until 23 March 1933, he served as Administrator of Affairs of the Council of People's Commissars, and was the second person to fill that post.

He was the first Soviet historian of Ireland and was considered the leading expert on Ireland in the Soviet Union.

== Biography ==
=== Early years ===
Kerzhentsev was born in to the family of a doctor. His father, Mikhail Dimitrievich Lebedev, was a deputy in the State Duma. He studied at the Faculty of History and Philology of the Moscow University however was expelled from the university for being involved in underground revolutionary activity.

Kerzhentsev became a member of the Bolshevik faction of the Russian Social Democratic Labour Party, led by Vladimir Lenin, in 1904, and worked for the Bolsheviks in Nizhny Novgorod, St Petersburg, and Kyiv. In 1905, he published a readingindex 'The Library of a Social Democrat'. He was arrested twice, in 1904 and 1906. In 1912, he emigrated to Britain, and later to the USA, and France.

He gained experience of mass theatre in Europe and anglophone countries during a period of exile. He was influenced by Percy MacKaye, Richard Wagner and Alexandr Bogdanov. He was in New York City in 1916, living in the same boarding house as Padraic Colum.

=== After 1917 ===
Returning to Russia in July 1917, Kerzhentsev worked for the newspaper Novaya Zhizn until 1918, when he was appointed deputy editor-chief of Izvestia. In 1919-1920, he was director of ROSTA, forerunner of the TASS news agency. In 1920, he was part of the soviet delegations during negotiations with Finland, then held senior posts in the People's Commissariat of Foreign Affairs. In 1921-23, he was soviet plenipotentiary in Sweden.

During the Russian Civil War, Kerzhentsev was a leading figure in the Proletkult movement. He published a book 'Creative Theatre' in 1918. He had articles published in Vestnik Teatra, the Journal of the Theatre Department of Narkompros based in Moscow. However, Lenin mistrusted Proletkult, and its founder Alexander Bogdanov and had it taken under party control in 1921, which is the probable reason for Kerzhentsev's posting to Sweden. He returned in 1923, and criticised Bogdanov in Pravda.

In 1923-35, he was chairman of the scientific organization of labour section of Rabkrin. He submitted a text, The Organizational Principles of a Uniform Economic Plan to the First Conference on Scientific Organization of Labour (January 1921). He opposed piece work and other incentives which he believed would create a 'working class aristocracy.

In 1925-26, he was Soviet plenipotentiary in Italy in 1925–26, and deputy head of the Central Statistical Administration, 1926–28.

In 1928, Kerzhentsev was appointed deputy head of Agitprop and head of the culture and science department of the VKP (b) Central Committee. In 1933-36, Kerzhentsev was President of the All Union Radio Committee 1933-36.

=== Theatre and Bulgakov ===
A champion of proletarian art, Kerzhentsev believed the role of theatre should not be to "train good professional actors" but instead should rely on "the creative instincts of the broad masses."

In 1927, he published an article attacking the Moscow Art Theatre over its staging of The Marriage of Figaro, because it depicted relations between "very pleasant aristocrats" and their servants as "friendly and peaceful", instead of accentuating the class struggle, which he claimed was what the writer, Pierre-Augustin de Beaumarchais, had intended.

He took a particular exception to the playwright, Mikhail Bulgakov. In January 1929, he played a pivotal part in getting Bulgakov's fourth play, Flight, banned. He then wrote an article that appeared in Pravda on 7 February 1929, alleging that the Ukrainian people were being insulted by a play performed at the Moscow Arts Theatre, his obvious target being Bulgakov's first and best known play, The Day of the Turbins known to western audiences as The White Guard, set in Kyiv. He criticised the People's Commissar for Enlightenment, Anatoli Lunacharsky for allowing it to be staged. The play was suppressed in March 1929, but later revived, because Stalin liked it.

He resumed his campaign in February 1935, after the first two performances of Bulgakov's last play, Moliere, or "The Cabal of Hypocrites had sold out. Kerzhentsev wrote to Joseph Stalin as General Secretary of the Communist Party of the Soviet Union, alleging that the play was an allegory which drew a parallel between Molière's humiliating treatment by Louis XIV and the treatment of Soviet artists - which very likely was Bulgakov's intention. The play was immediately banned.

=== Shostakovich ===
When the Soviet Union was founded, cultural policy was devolved to the governments of the component republics. This changed in January 1936, with the creation, on 17 January, of the State Committee on the Arts, with Kerzhentsev as its inaugural chairman, which meant that he was responsible for theatre, opera and music, painting and sculpture, as well as all the other art forms.

Within days of its formation, two articles appeared in Pravda attacking Dmitri Shostakovich over his opera Lady Macbeth of Mtsensk, and another of hjis works. The composer turned to Kerzhentsev for advice, and was told to write less complex music that the masses could understand.

=== 'Formalist' art ===
On May 19, 1936, Kerzhentsev sent a Memorandum “On the need to remove from museum exhibitions paintings of the Russian avant-garde, paintings of "Knave of Diamonds" group and other formalist groups” jointly addressed to Stalin and to Vyacheslav Molotov as Chairman of the Council of People's Commissars saying that:

Over the past 20-25 years, two largest museums, the State Tretyakov Gallery and the Russian Museum, have been filled with works of formalist kind. Insignificant in their artistic value and, in many cases, simply harmful, these works occupy a large part of the museums' exhibition space (for example, works by the "Jack of Diamonds" group and other formalist groups. I am enclosing photographs of such paintings). The unacceptably low level of many works that characterize the Soviet period is especially striking in comparison with the remarkable exhibition of Ilya Repin”.

He appealed to Stalin and Molotov to approve “the removal of paintings of formalist sort from the general exhibition halls of Tretyakov Gallery and Russian Museum in Leningrad. Simultaneously, he asked them to permit special exhibitions of the realist artists Ilya Repin, Vasily Surikov and Rembrandt “for the purpose of promoting realistic art”.

In June 1936, he published article “About the Tretyakov gallery” in “Pravda”, where he repeated the thesis already mentioned in his Memorandum of May 19, 1936:

The Tretyakov Gallery directors acted from the liberal position that the tasks of the gallery are to display all trends in painting without sufficient criteria and without any consideration of whether these canvases are realistic or not. In reality, that was concealed indulgence for all formalistic trends in painting. As a result, the Tretyakov Gallery began to be filled with formalistic works. Such paintings should not be in the general halls, but in special rooms for the needs of art historians or for the purpose of demonstrating the grossest formalistic errors committed by some of our artists. While the works of the greatest realist painters of the past should be returned to the Tretyakov Gallery and the Russian Museum.

=== Meyerhold ===
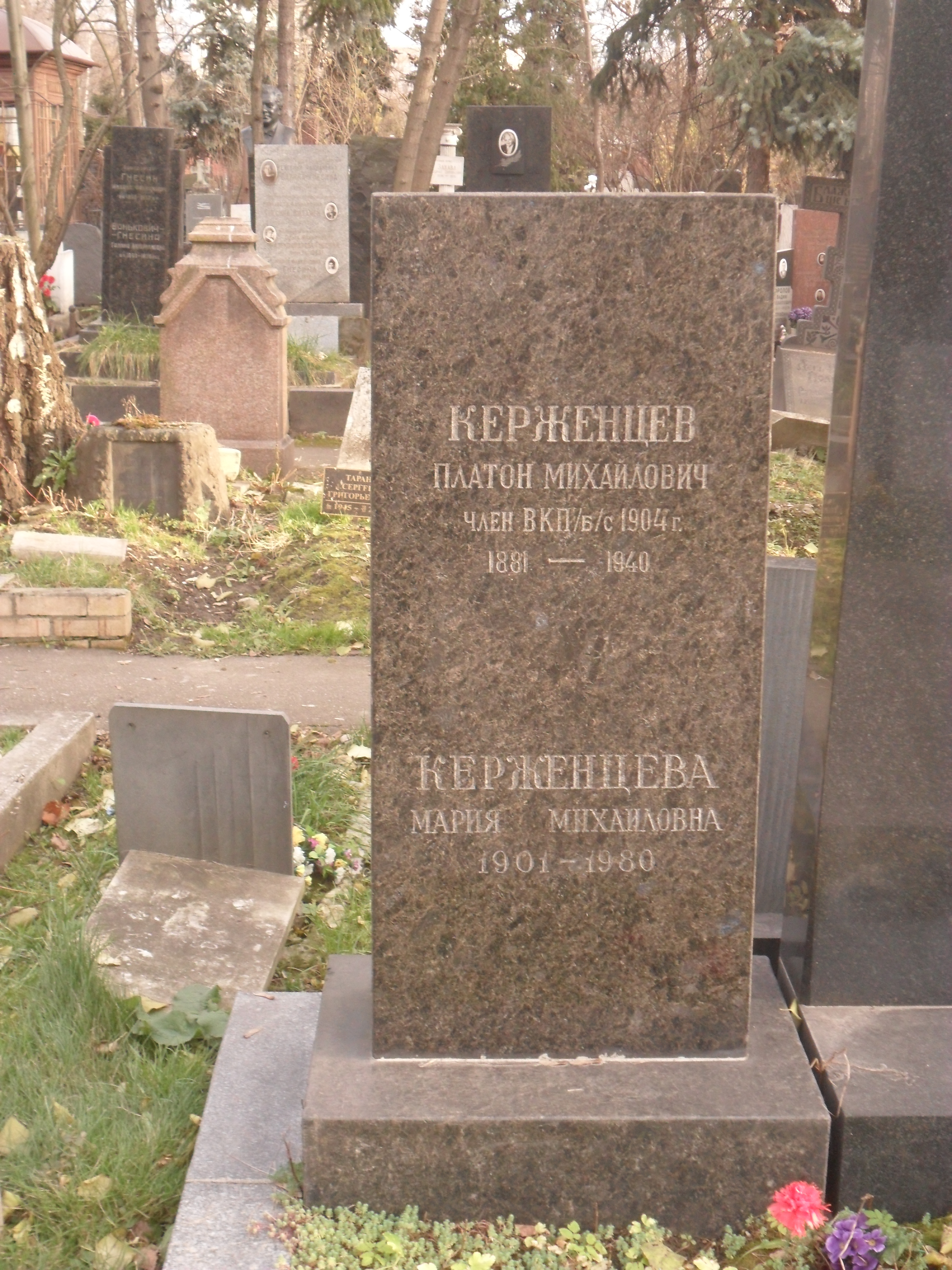
Platon Kerzhentsev's grave at the Novodevichy Cemetery

In November 1937, during preparations to celebrate the 20th anniversary of the Bolshevik revolution, Kerzhentsev and other officials went to watch a production of the play One Life, by Nikolai Ostrovsky, directed by Russia's best known experimental theatre director, Vsevolod Meyerhold, at the theatre named after him. On 17 December, Kerzhentsev launched an attack on the production, and the director, alleging that "Meyerhold cannot and, apparently, will not comprehend Soviet reality or depict the problems which concern every Soviet citizen..." The Meyerhold theatre was closed three weeks later, and Meyerhold was arrested, tortured, and killed.

=== Dismissal and Later Life ===
During a session of the USSR Supreme Soviet, on 17 January 1938, Andrei Zhdanov, the party secretary responsible for culture, criticised Kerzhentsev and the committee he chaired for having tolerated the Meyerhold theatre for too long. Kerzhentsev was dismissed two days later.

In the last years of his life, he was engaged in historical works, preparing the publication of the fundamental work "History of the Paris Commune of 1871". From April 1938 he was editor-in-chief and director of the Small Soviet Encyclopedia, deputy editor-in-chief of the Great Soviet Encyclopedia and deputy director of the Soviet Encyclopedia publishing house.

He died of heart failure in 1940.

== Publications ==
=== Books and pamphlets ===
Cover of Kerzhentsev's Stolitsa Anglii (State Publishing House, 1919).

- Biblioteka sotsialʹ-demokrata ; sistematicheskii ukazatelʹ sotsialʹ-demokraticheskoi literatury s prilozheniem programm dlia chteniia, primernykh bibliotek, spiskov knig po trudnosti i poverochnykh voprosov. [Social Democratic Library: A Systematic Index of Social Democratic Literature with Reading Syllabi, Sample Libraries, Lists of Books by Difficulty, and Test Questions] Nizhny-Novgorod: N.I. Volkov, 1906.
- Soiuzniki i Rossiia. [Allies and Russia] Moscow: Izdatel'stvo VTsIK Sovetov, 1918.
- Bor'ba za zemliu i voliu v Irlandii. [The Struggle for Land and Liberty in Ireland] Moscow: Kniga, 1918.
- Novaia Angliia. [New England] Moscow: Kniga, 1918.
- Gazeta: Ee otganizatsiia i tekhnika. [The Newspaper: Its Organization and Technique] Moscow: Izdatel'stvo VTsIK Sovetov, 1919. (reissued 1925.)
- Kul'tura i sovetskaia vlast'. [Culture and Soviet Power] Moscow: Izdatel'stvo VTsIK Sovetov, 1919.
- Tvorcheskii teatr. [Creative Theatre] Moscow: Izdatel'stvo VTsIK Sovetov, 1919.
- Revoliutsionnaia Irlandiia. [Revolutionary Ireland] Moscow: Gosizdat, 1918. (reissued 1922.)
- Revoliutsiia i teatr. [Revolution and Theatre] Moscow: Dennitsa, 1918.
- Кak vesti sobraniia. [How to Conduct Meetings] Moscow: Kniga, n.d. [1910s].
- Pervoe maia i mirovaia revoliutsiia, [The First of May and the World Revolution] Tver: Tsentropechat', 1919.
- Stolitsa Anglii. Progulki po Londonu. [The Capital of England: Walks Around London.] Moscow: Gosudarstvennoe izdatel’stvo 1919.
- К novoi kul'ture [Towards a New Culture] St. Petersburg: Gosizdat, 1921.
- Bor'ba za vremia. [The Struggle for Time] Moscow: Krasnaia Nov', 1923[?].
- Printsipy organizatsii. [Principles of Organization] Moscow–Petrograd: Gosizdat, 1923.
- Nauchnaia organizatsiia truda i zadachi partii. [Scientific Organization of Labor and the Tasks of the Party] Moscow–Petrograd: Gosizdat, 1923.
- Scientific Organization of Labor and the Tasks of the Party. [1923] Corvallis, OR: 1000 Flowers Publishing, 2026.
- Leninizm: Vvedenie v izuchenie leninizma. [Leninism: An Introduction to the Study of Leninism] Moscow: Gosizdat, 1925.
- Stranitsy istorii RKP(b). [Pages of History of the RKP(b)] Leningrad: Priboi, 1925.
- Organizuy camogo sebia. [Organize Yourself] Moscow: Molodaia gvardiia, 1925.
- Chemu uchit Lenin. [What Lenin Teaches] Leningrad–Moscow: Gosizdat, 1925.
- Azbuka Leninizma: Posovie dlia gorodskikh partshkol i samoobrazovaniia. [The ABCs of Leninism: A Handbook for City Party-schools and Self-Education.] Moscow: Gosizdat, 1929.
- Diktatura proletariata. [The Dictatorship of the Proletariat] Moscow: Gosizdat, 1929.
- Bolshevism for Beginners: A Handbook for New Members of the Communist Party and for Self-Education. Moscow: Centrizdat, 1931.
- Irlandiia v bor'be za nezavisimost'. [Ireland in the Struggle for Independence] Moscow: Gos. Sots.-Ekon. Izdatel'stvo, 1936.
- Zhizn' Lenina, 1870–1924. [The Life of Lenin, 1870–1924] Moscow: Partizdat, 1937.
- Protiv falsifikatsii narodnogo proshlogo. [Against the Falsification of the People’s Past] Moscow–Leningrad: Iskusstvo, 1937.
- Life of Lenin. New York: International Publishers, 1939.
- Istoriia Parizhskoi kommuny 1871 g. [History of the Paris Communne of 1871] Moscow: 1940. Second edition, 1959.

=== Articles ===
- "Proletkul't—organizatsiia proletarskoi samodeiatel'nosti," Proletarskaia kul'tura, no. 1 (1918), pp. 7–8;
- "Organizatsiia literaturnogo tvorchestva," Proletarskaia kul'tura, no. 5 (1918), pp. 23–26.
- "Posle prazdnika," Iskusstvo, no.6 (1918): 3–5.
- "Repertuar proletarskogo teatra," Iskusstvo, no. 1 [5] (1918), pp. 5–7.
- "Kollektivnoe tcorchestvo v teatre," Proletarskaia kul'tura, no. 7–8 (1919), pp. 37–41.
- "Mozhno li iskazhat' p'esy postanovkoi?" Vestnik teatra, no. 1 (1919), p. 2.
- "O professionalizme," Gorn, no. 4 (1919), pp. 69–71.
- "Peredelyvaite p'esy!', Vestnik teatra, no. 36 (1919), pp. 6–8.
- "Rozn' iskusstva," Vestnik teatra, no. 19 (1919), p. 2.
- "Burzhuaznoe nasledie," Vestnik teatra, no. 51 (1920), pp. 2–3.
- "Teatral'nyi muzei," Vestnik teatra, no. 48 (1920), pp. 4–5.
- "Pis'mo v redaktsiiu,", Vestnik teatra, no. 53 (1920), p. 5.

== See also ==
- Proletkult
