= Council of Ministers of the Soviet Union =

Highest executive and administrative organ from 1946 to 1991

Council of Ministers of the USSR Совет министров СССР
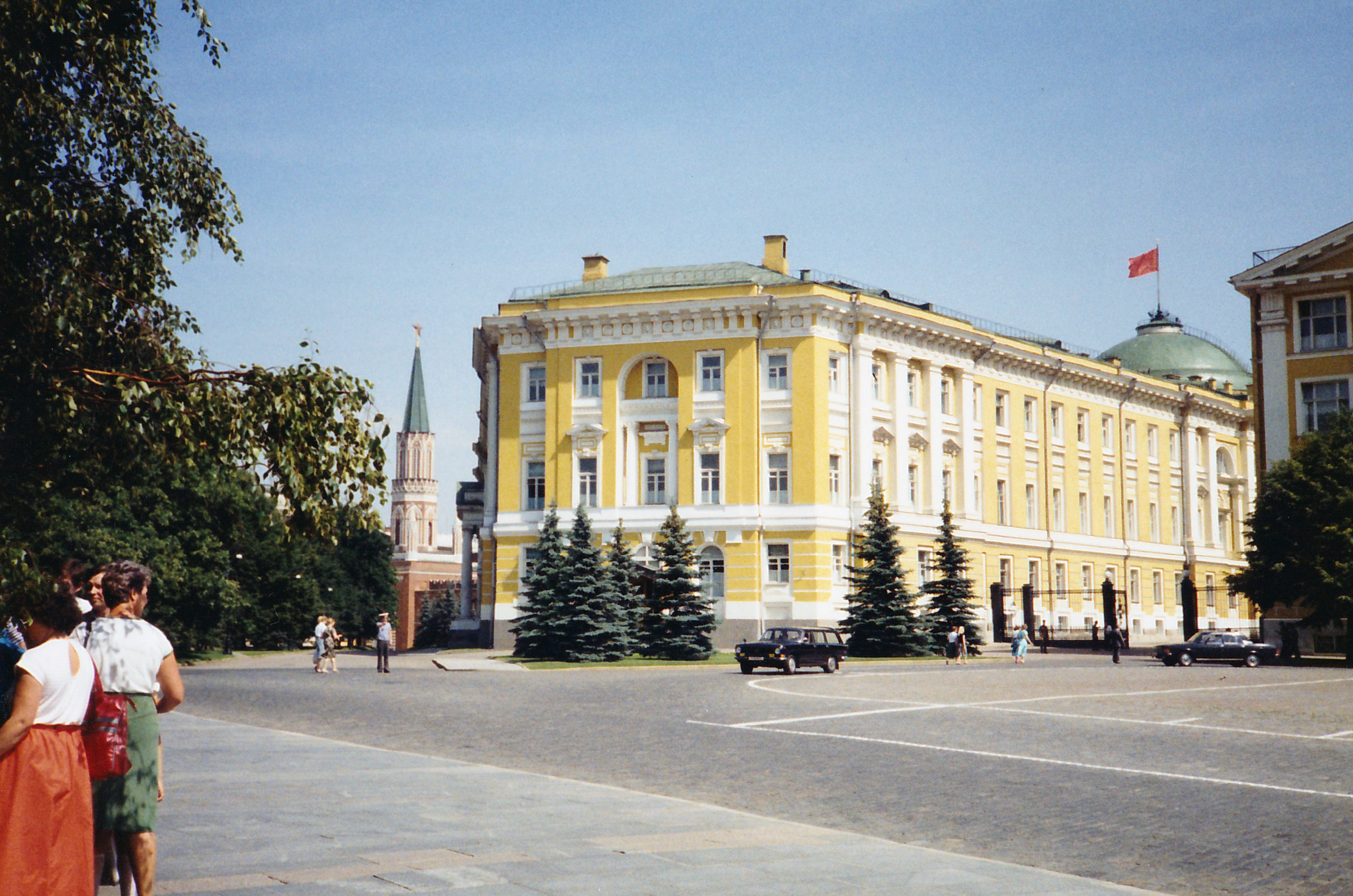
- The headquarters of the Council of Ministers in 1989

Agency overview
- Formed: 15 March 1946
- Preceding agency: Council of People's Commissars
- Dissolved: 14 January 1991
- Superseding agency: Cabinet of Ministers
- Jurisdiction: Union of Soviet Socialist Republics
- Headquarters: Kremlin Senate, Moscow

The Council of Ministers of the Union of Soviet Socialist Republics (Russian: Совет министров СССР, romanized: Sovet ministrov SSSR, IPA: [sɐˈvʲet mʲɪˈnʲistrəf ˌɛsˌɛsˌɛsˈɛr]) was the highest executive and administrative organ of state authority of the Union of Soviet Socialist Republics (USSR) from 1946 until 1991.

During 1946 the Council of People's Commissars was reorganized as the Council of Ministers. Accordingly, the People's Commissariats were renamed as Ministries. The council issued declarations and instructions based on and in accordance with applicable laws, which had obligatory jurisdictional power in all republics of the Union. However, the most important decisions were made by joint declarations with the Central Committee of the Communist Party of Soviet Union (CPSU), which was de facto more powerful than the Council of Ministers. During 1991 the Council of Ministers was dissolved, and replaced by the newly established "Cabinet of Ministers", which itself disappeared only months later when the USSR was disbanded.

There were seven Chairmen of the Council of Ministers between 1946 and early 1991, who were in effect the Premier of the USSR. After Nikita Khrushchev's dismissal from the jobs of First Secretary of the Communist Party and Premier, to be replaced by Leonid Brezhnev and Alexei Kosygin respectively, a Central Committee plenum forbade any person to hold the positions of First Secretary and Premier concurrently.

The Presidium of the Council of Ministers was the collective decision-making body of government. The Chairman of the Council of Ministers, his First Deputy Chairmen, Deputy Chairmen, ministers, State Committee chairmen, Soviet Republican Council of Ministers chairmen and other unspecified personnel were members of the Presidium.

== History ==
Chairmen	Term
Joseph Stalin	1946–1953
Georgy Malenkov	1953–1955
Nikolai Bulganin	1955–1958
Nikita Khrushchev	1958–1964
Alexei Kosygin	1964–1980
Nikolai Tikhonov	1980–1985
Nikolai Ryzhkov	1985–1991

The Council of People's Commissars, the Soviet Government, was transformed into the Council of Ministers during March 1946. At the same time The People's Commissariats were transformed into Ministries. Joseph Stalin's death began a power struggle within the Soviet government between the Government apparatus managed by Georgy Malenkov as Premier, and the Party apparatus managed by Nikita Khrushchev as General Secretary (a job which was named First Secretary from 1953 until 1966). Malenkov lost the power struggle, and during 1955 he was demoted from his office as Chairman of the Council of Ministers. He was succeeded in his job by Nikolai Bulganin, who was dismissed and replaced by Khrushchev because of his assistance to the Anti-Party Group, which had tried to oust Khrushchev during 1957.

After Khrushchev's dismissal from power, the collective leadership organized by Leonid Brezhnev and Alexei Kosygin had a Central Committee plenum which forbade any single person to have the two most powerful jobs in the country: First Secretary (renamed General Secretary during 1966) and Premier of the Council of Ministers. Kosygin, the Premier of the Council of Ministers, was in charge of economic administration while Brezhnev, the General Secretary, cared for other domestic matters. During the later part of the Brezhnev era the job of Premier of the Council of Ministers lost its rank as the second-most powerful in the USSR to the Chairman of the Presidium of the Supreme Soviet. Nikolai Podgorny's dismissal as chief of state during 1977 had the effect of reducing Kosygin's role in day-to-day management of government activities as Brezhnev strengthened his control over the government apparatus.

Kosygin resigned during 1980, to be succeeded by his First Deputy Chairman Nikolai Tikhonov. After five-years service, by the rules established by Leonid Brezhnev, Yuri Andropov and Konstantin Chernenko, Tikhonov was compelled to retire by Mikhail Gorbachev on 27 September 1985. Tikhonov was succeeded by Nikolai Ryzhkov. Ryzhkov was a half-hearted reformer, and was skeptical about de-nationalisation and the monetary reform of 1989; however, he did endorse the creation of a "regulated market" economy. During 1991 Ryzhkov was succeeded as Premier by Valentin Pavlov. The Council of Ministers was dissolved and replaced with the newly established Cabinet of Ministers.

== Duties, functions and responsibilities ==
The Council of Ministers was the manager of the government's executive part. Formed at a joint meeting of the Soviet of the Union and the Soviet of Nationalities, it consisted of a Premier, several First Deputies, Deputies, ministers, Chairmen of the state committees and the Chairmen of the Council of Ministers of the Soviet Republics. The Premier of the Council of Ministers could also recommend people who he found suitable for membership of the Council of Ministers to the Supreme Soviet. The Council of Ministers ended its functions on each first-convocation of a newly elected Supreme Soviet.

Responsible and accountable to the Supreme Soviet and during the period between convocations of the Supreme Soviet, the Council of Ministers was accountable to the Presidium of the Supreme Soviet and regularly reported to the Supreme Soviet on its work, as well as being tasked with resolving all state administrative duties in the jurisdiction of the USSR which were not the responsibility of the Supreme Soviet or the Presidium. Within its limits, the Council of Ministers had responsibility for:

- Management of the national economy and socio-cultural construction and development.
- Formulation and submission of the five-year plans for "economic and social development" to the Supreme Soviet along with the state budget.
- Defence of the interests of state, socialist property, public order and to protect the rights of Soviet citizens.
- Ensuring state security.
- General policies for the Soviet armed forces and determination of how many citizens were to be drafted into service.
- General policies concerning Soviet foreign relations and trade, economic, scientific-technical and cultural cooperation of the USSR with foreign countries as well as the power to confirm or denounce international treaties signed by the USSR.
- Creation of necessary organisations within the Council of Ministers concerning economics, socio-cultural development and defence.

The Council of Ministers could also issue decrees and resolutions and later verify their execution. All organisations were obliged to obey the decrees and resolutions issued by the All-Union Council of Ministers. The All-Union Council also had the power to suspend all mandates and decrees issued by itself or organisations subordinate to it. The Council coordinated and directed the work of the union republics and union ministries, state committees and other organs subordinate to it. The competence of the Council of Ministers and its Presidium with respect to their procedures and activities and the council's relationships with subordinate organs were defined in the Soviet constitution by the Law on the Council of Ministers of the USSR.

== Structure and organisation ==
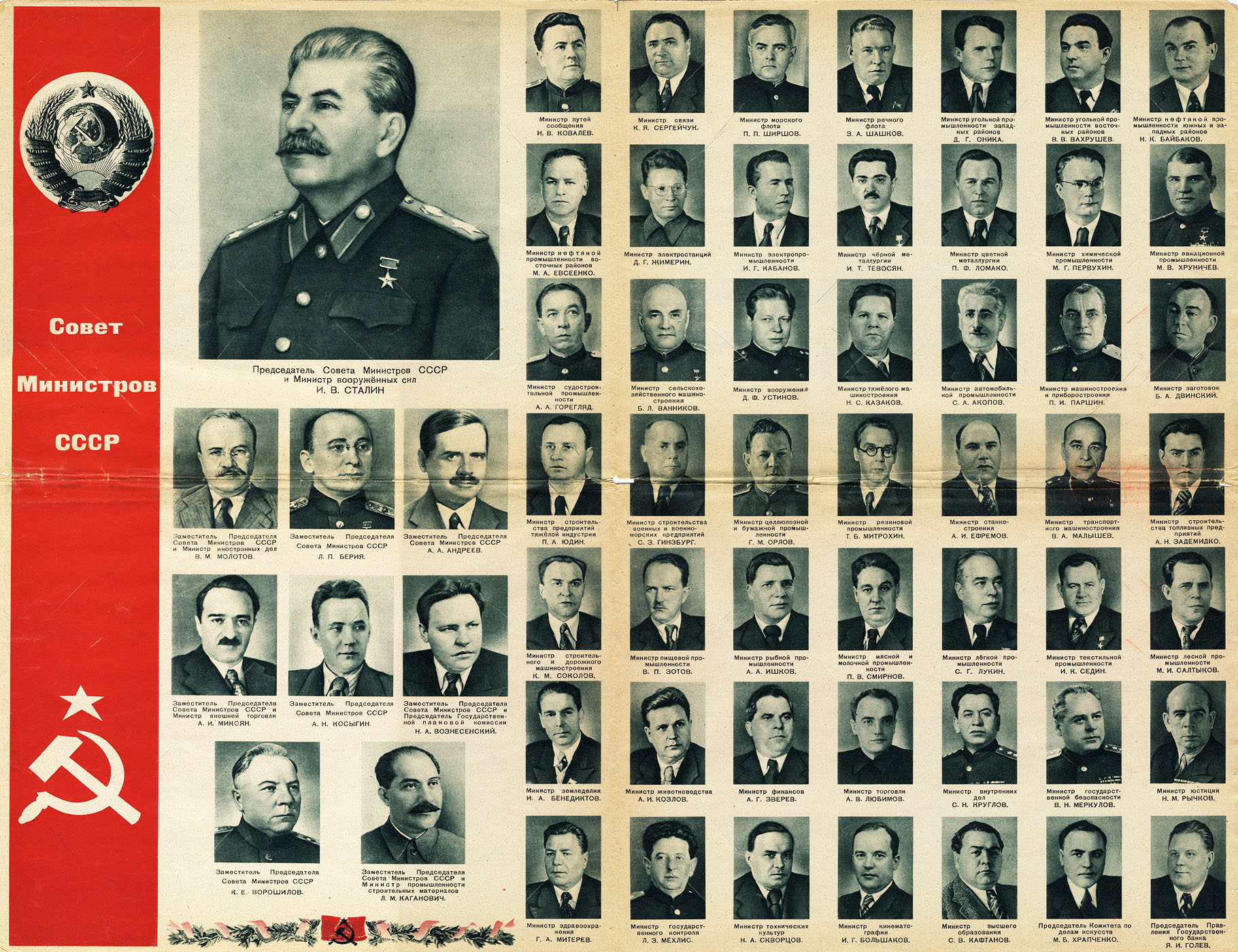
Composition of the Council of Ministers in 1950 with Joseph Stalin as Prime Minister

=== Ministries ===
During 1946, the All-Union Council of People's Commissars became the Council of Ministers (Russian: Совет Министров, tr.: Sovet Ministrov SSSR), whilst People's Commissars and People's Commissariats became Ministers and Ministries. Ministers were important for ordinary decision-making, with 73 percent of them elected full-members of the Central Committee at the 25th Party Congress.

Nikita Khrushchev's attempt during the late 1950s to decentralise decision-making by reforming the chain of command that was in use since the early times of the Council of People's Commissars to manage local industries and enterprises resulted in major reorganisation of the USSR ministries. A large number of ministries were eliminated and replaced by a network of regional and local sovnarkhoz supervised by the Supreme Soviet of the National Economy. Khrushchev's economic reform proved disastrous as it severed regional economic relations and was abandoned by the Soviet Government after Khrushchev's ousting in 1964. The year later twenty-eight industrial ministries, eleven All-union and seventeen Union ministries were reestablished. The second attempt at decentralising the Soviet economy was in 1965, with Premier Alexei Kosygin initiating a new economic reform aimed at giving enterprises more economic freedom and incentives to be profitable.

Certain major ministries had more influence over the national and international politics of the USSR, with their ministers being full members of Politburo. Among them were notables such as Leon Trotsky, Vyacheslav Molotov and Andrei Gromyko, heads of the Ministry of Foreign Affairs, and Andrei Grechko and Dmitriy Ustinov, the defence ministers.

=== State Committee ===
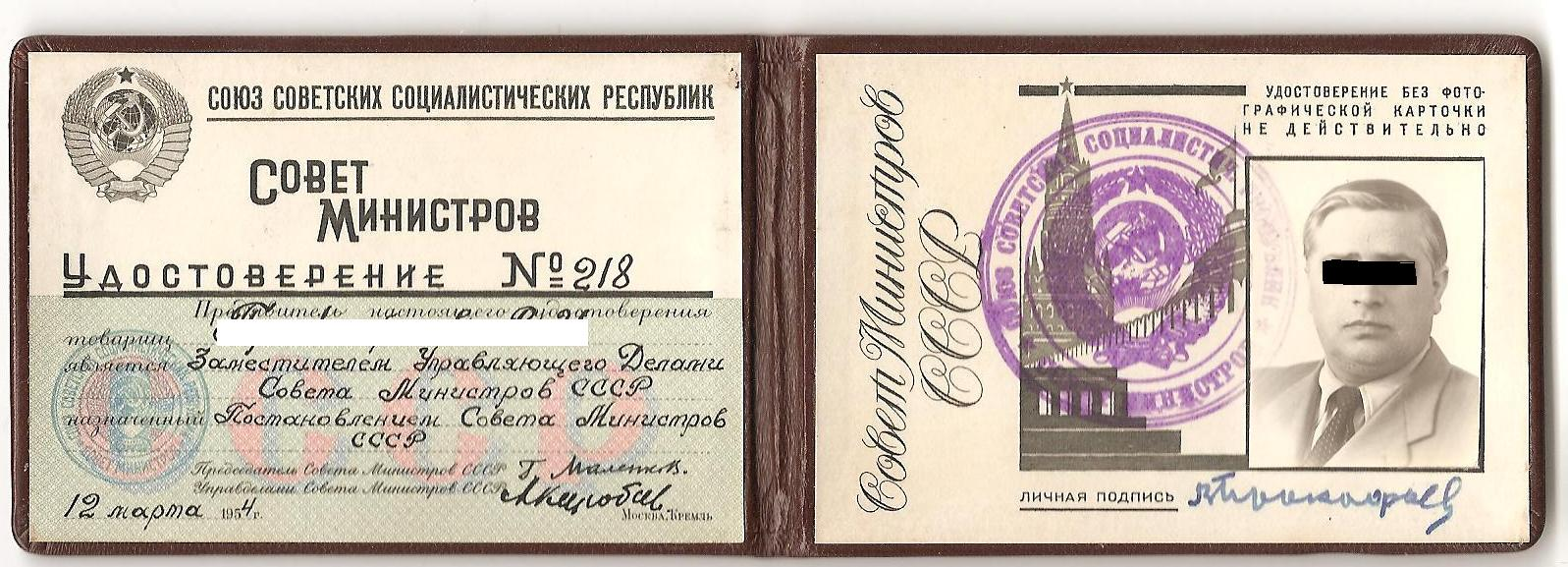
Identity document of a worker of the Council of Ministers apparatus from the 50s

USSR state committees were different from the ministries in that a state committee was primarily responsible for several parts of government as opposed to the one specific topic for which a ministry was solely responsible. Therefore, many state committees had jurisdiction over certain common activities performed by ministries such as research and development, standardisation, planning, building construction, state security, publishing, archiving and so on. The distinction between a ministry and a state committee could be obscure as for the case of the Committee for State Security (KGB).

State committees were instrumental in keeping the vast Soviet economic system coherent and integrated.

=== Presidium ===
The Presidium of the Council of Ministers was established during March 1953 as a result of the reorganisation of a special bureau formed during 1944 for the purpose of supervising and coordinating a vast network of government committees, commissions, and other institutions that reported directly to the Council of People's Commissars.

Throughout its existence, the Presidium of the Council of Ministers was a mysterious institution. First World observers knew little of the Presidium's activities and functions, or even the frequencies of its meetings. In Soviet textbooks and by officials it was described as an internal organ of the government. Churchward noted in his 1975 book that it was impossible to determine the importance of the Presidium in comparison with other organs of the Council of Ministers. British historian Leonard Schapiro, writes in his book The Government and Politics of the Soviet Union, that the Presidium worked somewhat as an "Inner Cabinet" for policy-making. Historians Hough and Fainsod believed there to be a "great overlap" between the responsibilities and functions of the Central Committee, Secretariat and the Presidium of the Council of Ministers. However, Schapiro was not sure of the Presidium's membership or if the Presidium had any meetings.

It is unknown whether the Presidium had any importance for ordinary policy-making during the 1950s and 1960s. Soviet works from that period make no mention of a Presidium of the Council of Ministers. Professor T.H. Rigby believes that the duties and responsibilities of the Presidium were at the time largely assumed by the Current Affairs Commission of the Council of Ministers and from 1956 possibly by the State Economic Commission of the Council of Ministers with both Commissions directed by Mikhail Pervukhin. During his visit to the USSR, political scientist Robert C. Tucker asked Mansur Mirza-Akhmedov, the Premier of the Council of Ministers of the Uzbek Soviet Socialist Republic, if the Presidium still functioned as an inner policy-making body. The answer he received was yes, and that the Presidium consisted of the Premier, two first deputy chairmen, four deputy chairmen, the Minister of Finance and the Minister of Agriculture.

During the 1970s Soviet authorities officially defined the Presidium's responsibilities and membership. The 1977 Soviet Constitution referred to the Presidium as a "permanent" organ of the Council of Ministers, which was established to secure good economic leadership and assume other administrative responsibilities. The few documents published provide evidence that the Presidium emphasised economic planning and decision-making as well as making important decisions lesser than those of the Communist Party's Politburo. Article 132 of the 1977 Soviet Constitution and Article 17 of the 1978 USSR Law that regulated the activities of the Soviet Government state that the Premier, the First Deputy, Deputy Chairmen, and other members of the USSR Council of Ministers were members of the Presidium. Regardless, the actual names of its members (other than the Premier) were never disclosed to the public.

== See also ==
- Deputy Chairman of the Council of Ministers
- First Deputy Chairman of the Council of Ministers
- Executive Officer of the Council of Ministers
- Council of People's Commissars
- Cabinet of Ministers (Soviet Union)

== Bibliography ==
- Churchward, L.G. (1975). Contemporary Soviet Government. Taylor & Francis. ISBN 978-0-7100-8202-2.
- Hough, Jerry; Fainsod, Merle (1979). How the Soviet Union is Governed. Harvard University Press. ISBN 978-0-674-41030-5.
- Schapiro, Leonard (1977). The Government and Politics of the Soviet Union. Taylor & Francis. ISBN 978-0-09-131721-8.
