= Administrator of Affairs of the Soviet Union =

Soviet Union government official

The Administrator of Affairs of the Council of People's Commissars of the Soviet Union and Council of Labour and Defense (Note: Russian: Управляющие делами Совета Народных Комиссаров Союза ССР и Совета Труда и Обороны, romanized: Upravlyayushchie delami Soveta Narodnykh Komissarov Soyuza SSR i Soveta Truda i Oborony,) or Secretary to the Premier, was a high-standing officer within the Soviet Government whose main task was to co-sign, with the Premier of the Soviet Union, decrees and resolutions made by the All-Union government.

The government apparatus (office of government affairs, Russian: Управление Делами Совета Народных Комиссаров Союза ССР, romanized: Upravlenie Delami Soveta Narodnykh Komissarov Soyuza SSR) prepared items of policy, which the office holder would check systematically against decrees of the Party-Government. This function consisted of several departments and other structural units. The Soviet government apparatus was headed by the Administrator of Affairs who, in accordance with the established order, was a member of the federal government body.

== List of administrators ==
# (Note: These numbers are not official.)	Holder	Tenure	Premier
1	Administrator of Affairs of the Council of People's Commissars (1922–1946)		
1	Nikolai Gorbunov	17 July 1923 – 29 December 1930	Vladimir Lenin
1	Nikolai Gorbunov	17 July 1923 – 29 December 1930	Alexey Rykov
1	Nikolai Gorbunov	17 July 1923 – 29 December 1930	Vyacheslav Molotov
2	Platon Kerzhentsev	29 December 1930 – 23 March 1933	Vyacheslav Molotov
3	Ivan Miroshnikov	23 March 1933 – 29 March 1937	Vyacheslav Molotov
4	Mikhail Arbuzov	29 March 1937 – 31 July 1937	Vyacheslav Molotov
5	Nikolay Petrunichev	31 July 1937 – 5 November 1938	Vyacheslav Molotov
6	Ivan Bolshakov	17 December 1938 – 4 June 1939	Vyacheslav Molotov
7	Mikhail Khlomov	10 June 1939 – 14 November 1940	Vyacheslav Molotov
8	Yakov Chadayev	14 November 1940 – 15 March 1946	Vyacheslav Molotov
8	Yakov Chadayev	14 November 1940 – 15 March 1946	Joseph Stalin
8	Administrator of Affairs of the Council of Ministers (1946–1991)		
8	Yakov Chadayev	19 March 1946 – 13 March 1949	Joseph Stalin
9	Mikhail Pomaznev	13 March 1949 – 29 June 1953	Joseph Stalin
9	Mikhail Pomaznev	13 March 1949 – 29 June 1953	Georgy Malenkov
10	Anatoly Korobov	29 June 1953 – 1 July 1958	Georgy Malenkov
10	Anatoly Korobov	29 June 1953 – 1 July 1958	Nikolai Bulganin
10	Anatoly Korobov	29 June 1953 – 1 July 1958	Nikita Khrushchev
11	Pyotr Demichev	1 July 1958 – 3 March 1959	Nikita Khrushchev
12	George Stepanov	18 March 1959 – 22 October 1964	Nikita Khrushchev
12	George Stepanov	18 March 1959 – 22 October 1964	Alexei Kosygin
13	Mikhail Smirtyukov	18 December 1964 – 7 June 1989	Alexei Kosygin
13	Mikhail Smirtyukov	18 December 1964 – 7 June 1989	Nikolai Tikhonov
13	Mikhail Smirtyukov	18 December 1964 – 7 June 1989	Nikolai Ryzhkov
14	Mikhail Shkabardnya	7 June 1989 – 21 March 1991	Nikolai Ryzhkov
15	Administrative Director of the Cabinet of Ministers (1991)		
15	Igor Prostiakov	21 March 1991 – 26 November 1991	Valentin Pavlov
15	Igor Prostiakov	21 March 1991 – 26 November 1991	Ivan Silayev
