= Supreme Soviet of the National Economy =

Soviet government executive body

Supreme Board of the National Economy
- Высший совет народного хозяйства
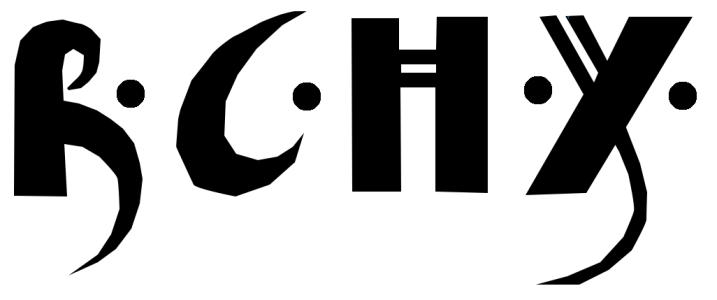
- Logo image

Agency overview
- Formed: 1917
- Jurisdiction: Russian Socialist Federative Soviet Republic
- Headquarters: Moscow

The Supreme Soviet of the National Economy or Superior Soviet of the People's Economy (Russian: Высший совет народного хозяйства, ВСНХ, romanized: Vysshiy sovet narodnogo khozyaystva, VSNKh, Vesenkha or Vesenka) was the superior state institution for management of the economy of the RSFSR and later of the Soviet Union. There were two institutions with this name, at different times, 1917–1932 and 1963–1965.

== 1917–1932 ==
The VSNKh of the first period was the supreme organ of the management of the economy, mainly of the industry.

=== Foundation ===
The VSNKh was launched on December 5, 1917, through a decree of the Council of People's Commissars (Sovnarkom) and All-Russian Central Executive Committee of Soviets of the Russian Socialist Federative Soviet Republic. Its stated purpose was to "plan for the organization of the economic life of the country and the financial resources of the government". It was subordinated to the Sovnarkom. The recently established All-Russian Council for Workers' Control was dissolved into the new organisation. It had rights of confiscation and expropriation. The first chairman was Valerian Osinsky and with Bukharin, Georgy Oppokov (Lomov), Milyutin, Sokolnikov, and Vasili Schmidt also appointed to the council.

=== Reorganisation ===
After the creation of the Soviet Union in 1923 it was transformed into the joint all-Union and republican People's Commissariat. In 1932, it was reorganized into three People's Commissariats: of heavy industry, light industry and forestry.

In each of the union republics of the Soviet Union, subordinate organisations existed. These were referred to as ВСНХ followed by their union republic acronym. (for example ВСНХ БССР (VSNKh BSSR) for the Belarusian SSR). The all-union council could be referred to as ВСНХ СССР (VSNKh SSSR). The republican VSNKhs had control over small scale, minor industries which used local materials and supplied local markets and which were referred to as "enterprises of republican subordination". Large scale industrial enterprises ("enterprises of union subordination") were controlled by one of the industrial sector departments of the all-union VSNKh.

=== Organisational structure ===
Within the VSNKh, departments were split into two types.

==== Functional sector departments ====
Departments within the functional sector dealt with decisions relating to finance, planning, economic policy, and research and development.

==== Industrial sector departments ====
Departments of this type were created by decree in 1926 and consisted of "chief departments", known as glavki (glavnye upravlenija).

Heads of all the departments in this sector formed the council of the all-union VSNKh together with representatives from the union republics.

==== Heads of the VSNKh ====
- Valerian Osinsky (1917–1918)
- Varvara Yakovleva (1918)
- Alexei Rykov (1918–1921)
- Felix Dzerzhinsky (1924–1926)
- Valerian Kuybyshev (1926–1930)
- Sergo Ordzhonikidze (1930–1932)

== 1963–1965 ==
Vesenkha was reestablished by Nikita Khrushchev when he introduced decentralization of the management of industry by means of sovnarkhozes. It was subordinated to the Council of Ministers of the USSR and managed industry and construction.

Sovnarkhozes were introduced by Nikita Khrushchev in July 1957 in an attempt to combat the centralization and departmentalism of ministries. The USSR was initially divided into 105 economic regions, with sovharknozes being operational and planning management. Simultaneously, a large number of ministries were shut down.
