= Nikolai Gorbunov =

Soviet politician, chemist, engineer and academic

- Николай Горбунов
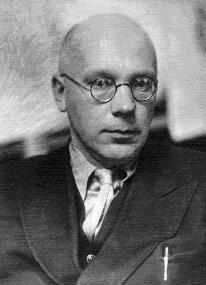
- Gorbunov in 1936

Administrator of Affairs of the Council of People's Commissars of the Soviet Union
- In office 17 July 1923 – 29 December 1930
- Premier: Vladimir Lenin; Alexey Rykov; Vyacheslav Molotov
- Preceded by: Position established
- Succeeded by: Platon Kerzhentsev

Personal details
- Born: 9 July 1892 Krasnoye Selo, St. Petersburg Oblast, Russian Empire
- Died: 7 September 1938 (aged 46) Moscow Oblast, Russian SFSR, Soviet Union
- Party: All-Union Communist Party (Bolsheviks) (1917–1937)
- Profession: Civil servant, chemist

Nikolai Petrovich Gorbunov (Russian: Николай Петрович Горбунов; 21 June 1892 – 7 September 1938) was a Soviet politician, chemist, engineer, academic and mountaineer. At one time he served as personal secretary to Soviet leader Vladimir Lenin. Gorbunov was executed during the Great Purge.

== Biography ==
Born in Krasnoye Selo, in Saint Petersburg, his parents were Pyotr Mikhailovich Gorbunov and Sofia Vasilievna Gorbunova. Pyotr was an honoured citizen who worked as an engineer and later as a director of a paper factory not far from Saint Petersburg. Sofia Vasilievna descended from the Pechatkin family and was a joint owner of the factory, of which her husband was a director. Both Gorbunov's parents owned a number of middle-sized houses. In 1911, they bought an estate of about 1,650 acres (6.7 km^{2}) in Yamburg. Pyotr Mikhailovich was a liberal who founded a school for the children of workers at his factory. His brother was the naturalist Grigoriy Petrovich Gorbunov. Gorbunov graduated from the Petrograd Institute of Technology and received a diploma in chemistry and technology. From his student years he was a convicted Marxist and actively participated in the February Revolution.

Gorbunov joined the Russian Social Democratic Labour (b) in July 1917 and started to work in the apparatus of the Soviet government with the recommendation of Vladimir Bonch-Bruevich.

Gorbunov was secretary of the Council of People's Commissars of the USSR and wrote of the period immediately following the Bolshevik seizure of power:

In spite of the government's decrees and its demands that funds should be made available, the State Bank brazenly sabotaged. The People's Commissar of Finance, Menzhinsky, could do nothing to make the bank place at the government's disposal the funds that were necessary for the revolution. Not even the arrest of Shipov, the Director of the State Bank, helped. Shipov was brought to Smolny and kept there for a time under arrest. He slept in the same room with Menzhinsky and me. In the daytime this room was used as an office (of the Commissariat of Finance, I believe). I was obliged, as a mark of special courtesy and greatly to my annoyance, to let him have my bed while I slept on chairs.

On 17 July 1918, Gorbunov received a coded telegram from Alexander Beloborodov, the Chairman of the Presidium of the Ural Regional Soviet, regarding the shooting of the former Tsar Nicholas II and his family, with instructions to pass on the message to Yakov Sverdlov without delay. Sverdlov announced the tsar's death to the All-Russian Congress of Soviets the following day. Later, in 1925, Gorbunov was part of a Soviet delegation (along with Anatoly Lunacharsky, Mikhail Kalinin and Sergey Oldenburg) that met with Friedrich Schmidt-Ott in Leningrad to discuss scientific cooperation between the Soviet Union and Germany.

In addition to his scientific and political endeavours, Gorbunov was an accomplished mountaineer. He headed a large-scale expedition to the Pamir Mountains in Tajikistan between 1932 and 1935, and partook in the first ascent of Stalin Peak (the highest mountain in the Soviet Union) in September 1933.

He served in his role as Administrator of Affairs of the Council of People's Commissars until 1930, continuing to serve under the Premierships of Alexei Rykov and Vyacheslav Molotov after the death of Lenin. From 1923 to 1929 he was rector of the Bauman Moscow State Technical University. From 1935 he was a full member, and in 1937 he was secretary of the Academy of Sciences of the Soviet Union.

In his capacity as secretary of the Academy, Gorbunov acted as "prosecutor" in the expulsion of Nikolai Bukharin during the Great Purge. However, Gorbunov himself was subsequently arrested, indicted for espionage and sentenced to death. He was executed on the Kommunarka shooting ground on 7 September 1938.

He was rehabilitated in 1954.
