= Vasily Schmidt =

Soviet politician (1886–1938)

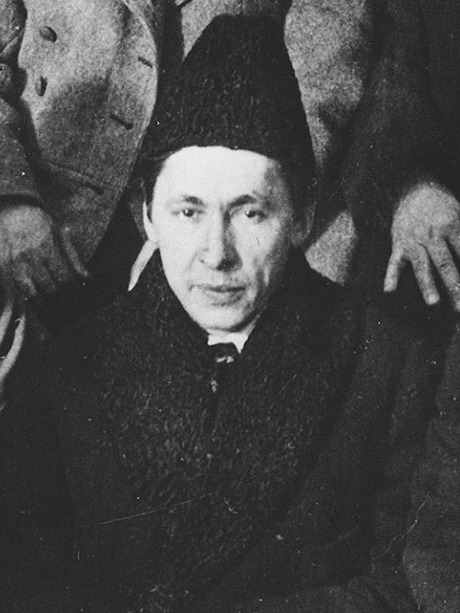
Schmidt at the 8th Party Congress, March 1919

Vasily Vladimirovich Schmidt (Russian: Василий Владимирович Шмидт; December 17, 1886 – July 28, 1938) was a Bolshevik politician, and later a Soviet statesman.

Born in Saint Petersburg to a German Russian working-class family.

He was a member of the Russian Social Democratic Labour Party from 1905.

From February 1917, he became the secretary of the Petrograd Committee of the RSDLP (B) and the Central Council of Trade Unions of Petrograd and a member of the Petrograd Military Revolutionary Committee.

On 1 December 1918, he was appointed People's Commissar for Labour, a post he held until 29 November 1928. The English journalist Arthur Ransome met him soon after his appointment, and described him as "a clean-shaven, intelligent young man, whose attention to business methods is reflected in his Commissariat, which is extremely clean and very well organised." Schmidt told him that the commissariat was "controlled directly by the unions", and that he was elected to his position by the General Council of Trades Unions. At the same time a member of the Presidium and secretary of the All-Union Central Council of Trade Unions. He was particularly concerned with the statification of the trade unions.

During the Great Purge, he was arrested on January 5, 1937. Convicted on June 3, 1937, to 10 years in prison, on January 28, 1938, he was sentenced to capital punishment and shot on the same day.

Schmidt was rehabilitated on July 30, 1957.

== Bibliography ==
- Kaplan, Frederick (1968). Bolshevik Ideology and the Ethics of Soviet labor. Philosophical library, New York.
