= Valerian Kuybyshev =

Soviet politician (1888–1935)

- Валериан Куйбышев
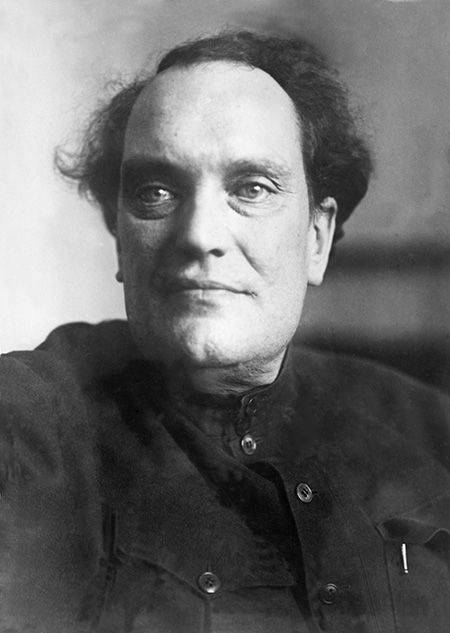
- Kuybyshev in the 1930s

First Deputy Chairman of the Council of People's Commissars of the Soviet Union
- In office 14 May 1934 – 25 January 1935
- Premier: Vyacheslav Molotov

Chairman of the Supreme Soviet of the National Economy
- In office 5 August 1926 – 10 November 1930
- Premier: Alexey Rykov
- Preceded by: Felix Dzerzhinsky
- Succeeded by: Sergo Ordzhonikidze

Chairman of the State Planning Committee
- In office 10 November 1930 – 25 April 1934
- Premier: Vyacheslav Molotov
- Preceded by: Gleb Krzhizhanovsky
- Succeeded by: Valery Mezhlauk

People's Commissar of the Workers' and Peasants' Inspectorate
- In office 6 July 1923 – 5 August 1926
- Premier: Vladimir Lenin; Alexey Rykov
- Preceded by: Post established
- Succeeded by: Sergo Ordzhonikidze

Full member of the 15th, 16th, 17th Politburo
- In office 19 December 1927 – 25 January 1935

Member of the 11th Secretariat
- In office 3 April 1922 – 25 April 1923

Full member of the 12th, 17th Orgburo
- In office 10 February 1934 – 25 January 1935
- In office 26 April 1923 – 2 June 1924

Personal details
- Born: 6 June 1888 Omsk, Russia
- Died: 25 January 1935 (aged 46) Moscow, Soviet Union
- Resting place: Kremlin Wall Necropolis
- Party: RSDLP (Bolsheviks) (1904–1918); Russian Communist Party (1918–1935)

Valerian Vladimirovich Kuybyshev (Note: In this name that follows East Slavic naming customs, the patronymic is Vladimirovich and the family name is Kuybyshev.) (Russian: Валериан Владимирович Куйбышев; 6 June [O.S. 25 May] 1888 – 25 January 1935) was a Russian revolutionary, Red Army officer, and prominent Soviet politician.

== Biography ==
=== Early years ===
Born in Omsk in Siberia on 6 June [O.S. 25 May] 1888, Kuybyshev studied at the Siberian Military Cadet School, a Cadet Corps in Omsk. He joined the Bolshevik faction of the Russian Social Democratic Labour Party in 1904. The following year, he entered the Imperial Military-medical Academy in Saint Petersburg, but was expelled in 1906 for controversial political activities.

=== Revolutionary career ===
Between 1906 and 1914 Kuybyshev carried out subversive activities for the Bolsheviks throughout the Russian Empire, for which he was exiled to Narym (near Tomsk) in Siberia. There together with Yakov Sverdlov, he set up a local Bolshevik organization. In May 1912 he fled from exile and returned to Omsk, where he was arrested the next month, and imprisoned for a year. He was transferred to Tambov to live independently under police surveillance, but soon fled again, whereafter he spent 1913–14 encouraging civil unrest in the cities of Saint Petersburg, Kharkov, and Vologda. He relocated to Samara in 1917; and became president of the local soviet—a position he held at the time of the 1917 October Revolution and for the next year. During the Russian Civil War of 1917-1923 he chaired the revolutionary committee of Samara province and became a political commissar in the First and Fourth Red Armies.

=== Political career ===
In 1920 Kuybyshev became a member of the Presidium of the Red International of Trade Unions, which charged him with the implementation of the GOELRO plan. From 6 July 1923 to 5 August 1926 he served as the first economical inspector of the USSR (People's Commissar of the Rabkrin). From 1926 to 1930 he chaired the Supreme Council of the National Economy, from 1930 to 1934 he directed Gosplan, and he served as a full member of the Politburo from 1934 until his death. As a principal economic advisor to Joseph Stalin, he became one of the most influential members in the Communist Party. He was awarded the Order of the Red Banner. Kuybyshev was one of the initiators of the first edition of the Great Soviet Encyclopedia and served as a member of its chief editorial board.

== Death and legacy ==
Kuybyshev married several times.

Kuybyshev died in Moscow on 25 January 1935 of heart failure at the age of 46.

In accordance with Bolshevik tradition, he was cremated, and the urn with his ashes was interred in the Kremlin Wall Necropolis.

Kuybyshev's younger brother, Nikolay, was also an old Bolshevik and Red Army officer until his 1938 arrest in the Great Purge.

== Commemoration ==
The city of Samara (the administrative city of the Samara Oblast, Russia), the town of Bolgar (in the Republic of Tatarstan, Russia), the village of Haghartsin, Armenia, and the village of Urasar, Armenia were all renamed "Kuybyshev" during the period between 1935 and 1991. The town of Kuybyshev in Novosibirsk Oblast, Russia, retains the name to this day. Statues of Kuybyshev stand in Kuybyshev Square in Samara and in Dushanbe, Tajikistan.

Ships named after Valerian Kuybyshev include:

- the Soviet destroyer Valerian Kuybyshev (under that name from 1937 to 1957)
- the river cruise-ship Valerian Kuybyshev from 1976 to 2018

== See also ==
- Outline of the Russian Revolution and Civil War
- Bibliography of the Russian Revolution and Civil War
- Bibliography of Stalinism and the Soviet Union
- Index of Old Bolsheviks
- Index of articles related to the Russian Revolution and Civil War
