= Index of Old Bolsheviks =

Alphabetical list of Old Bolsheviks

Old Bolsheviks Старые большевики
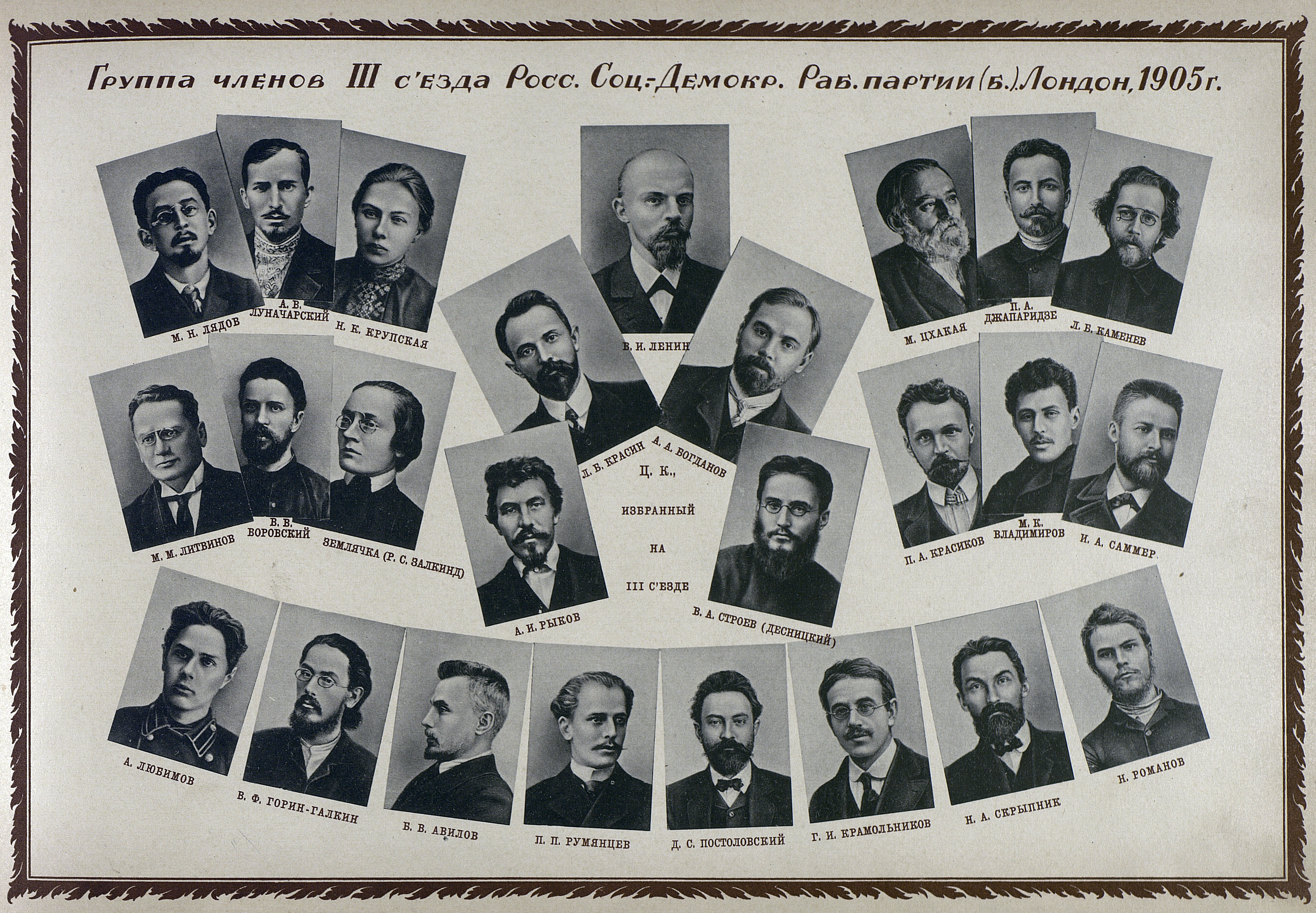
- Leader: Vladimir Lenin (1903–1924)
- Founder: Vladimir Lenin
- Founded: 1903
- Split from: Russian Social Democratic Labour Party
- Ideology: Bolshevism; Marxism; Leninism
- Political position: Far-left
- National affiliation: Russian Social Democratic Labour Party (1903–1918); Communist Party of the Soviet Union (from 1918)

The following list is an index of individuals considered Old Bolsheviks.

The term "Old Bolshevik" referred to Bolsheviks who joined the Russian Social Democratic Labour Party before 1905. On February 13, 1922, the Society of Old Bolsheviks was established under the chairmanship of Mikhail Olminsky. Its first statute required party membership before January 1, 1905, (Note: Some works include those that joined the Bolsheviks before the 1917 revolution.) though Social Democrats with equal seniority who later joined the Bolsheviks were sometimes admitted. The society dissolved itself in 1935.

== A ==
- Alexander Abramov-Mirov - (1895 – executed 1937)
- Iosif Adamovich - (1897 – 1937)
- Vladimir Adoratsky - (1878 – 1945)
- Sultan Majid Afandiyev - (1887 – executed 1938)
- Konstantin Akashev - (1888 – executed 1931)
- Ivan Akulov - (1888 – executed 1937)
- Grigory Aleksinsky - (1879 – 1967)
- Andrey Andreyevich Andreyev - (1895 – 1971)
- Zigmas Angarietis - (1882 – 1940)
- Olga Anikst - (1886 – 1959)
- Nikolai Antipov - (1894 – executed 1938)
- Vladimir Antonov-Ovseenko - (1883 – executed 1938)
- Vladimir Antonov-Saratovsky - (1884 – 1965)
- Jaan Anvelt - (1884 – 1937)
- Ernest Appoga - (1898 – executed 1937)
- Inessa Armand - (1874 – 1920)
- Aleksandr Arosev - (1890 – executed 1938)
- Peter Arshinov - (1887 – executed 1937)
- Aleksandra Artyukhina - (1889 – 1969)
- Georgi Atarbekov - (1891 – 1925)
- Voldemar Aussem - (1879 – ?)
- Varlam Avanesov - (1884 – 1930)
- Vasiliy Averin - (1884 – 1945)
- Mashadi Azizbeyov - (1876 – executed 1918)

Return to Table of Contents

== B ==
- Ivan Babushkin - (1873 – executed 1906)
- Alexei Badayev - (1883 – 1951)
- Sergey Yustinovich Bagotsky - (1879 – 1953)
- Ivan Bakayev - (1887 – executed 1936)
- Vladimir Bakhmetyev - (1885 – 1966)
- Sergei Bakinsky - (1886 – 1939)
- Pyotr Baranov - (1892 – 1933)
- Vladimir Bazarov - (1874 – 1939)
- Georgy Bazilevich - (1889 – executed 1939)
- Demyan Bedny - (1883 – 1945)
- Dāvids Beika - (1885 – 1946)
- Alexander Bekzadyan - (1879 – executed 1938)
- Alexander Beloborodov - (1891 – executed 1938)
- Eizhen Berg - (1892 – executed 1918)
- Boris Berman - (1901 – executed 1939)
- Matvei Berman - (1898 – executed 1939)
- Jan Antonovich Berzin - (1881 – executed 1938)
- Reinholds Bērziņš - (1888 – executed 1938)
- Aleksandr Bezymensky - (1898 – 1973)
- Georgy Blagonravov - (1898 – executed 1938)
- Vasily Blyukher - (1889 – 1938)
- Stanisław Bobiński - (1882 – executed 1937)
- Cecilia Bobrovskaya - (1873 – 1960)
- Vladimir Bobrovsky - (1873 – 1924)
- Alexander Bogdanov - (1873 – 1928)
- Pyotr Bogdanov - (1882 – executed 1939)
- Vladimir Bogushevsky - (1895 – executed 1939)
- Gleb Bokii - (1879 – executed 1937)
- Vladimir Bonch-Bruyevich - (1873 – 1955)
- Mikhail Borodin - (1884 – 1951)
- Yevgenia Bosch - (1879 – 1925)
- Yacov Boyarsky - (1890 – executed 1940)
- Mieczysław Broński - (1882 – executed 1938)
- Mikhail Brusnev - (1864 – 1937)
- Nikolai Bryukhanov - (1878 – executed 1938)
- Andrei Bubnov - (1883 – executed 1938)
- Nikolai Bukharin - (1888 – executed 1938)
- Nikolai Bulganin - (1895 – 1975)
- Anton Bulin - (1894 – executed 1938)
- Dadash Bunyadzade - (1888 – executed 1938)
- Nikolay Burenin - (1874 – 1962)
- Ullu-biy Buynaksky - (1890 – executed 1919)

Return to Table of Contents

== C ==
- Vasily Chapayev - (1887 – 1919)
- Alexander Chervyakov - (1892 – 1937)
- Vlas Chubar - (1891 – executed 1939)
- Nikolai Chuzhak - (1876 – 1937)

Return to Table of Contents

== D ==
- Alexander Danieliuk-Stefanski - (1897 – executed 1937)
- Jūlijs Daniševskis - (1884 – executed 1938)
- Pauls Dauge - (1869 – 1946)
- Terenty Deribas - (1883 – executed 1938)
- Gaioz Devdariani - (1901 – executed 1937)
- Semyon Dimanstein - (1886 – executed 1938)
- Nikolay Dobrokhotov - (1879 – executed 1938)
- Anna Dodonova - (1888 – 1967)
- Alexander Dogadov - (1888 – executed 1937)
- Yakov Doletsky - (1888 – 1937)
- Yakov Drobnis - (1890 – executed 1937)
- Ivan Naumovich Dubovoy - (1896 – executed 1938)
- Iosif Dubrovinsky - (1877 – 1913)
- Semyon Dukelsky - (1892 – 1960)
- Boris Dumenko - (1888 – executed 1920)
- Pavel Dybenko - (1889 – executed 1938)
- Felix Dzerzhinsky - (1877 – 1926)
- Prokofy Dzhaparidze - (1880 – executed 1918)

Return to Table of Contents

== E ==
- Ilya Ehrenburg - (1891 – 1967)
- Aleksandr Eiduk - (1886 – executed 1938)
- Teodors Eihmans - (1897 – executed 1938)
- Robert Eikhe - (1890 – executed 1940)
- Shalva Eliava - (1883 – executed 1937)
- Konstantin Eremeev - (1874 – 1931)
- Peter Ermakov - (1884 – 1952)
- Efrem Eshba - (1893 – executed 1939)
- Maria Essen - (1872 – 1956)

Return to Table of Contents

== F ==
- Rafail Farbman - (1893 – 1966)
- Innokenty Fedenev - (1878 – 1946)
- Ivan Fedko - (1897 – executed 1939)
- Yakov Fedorenko - (1896 – 1947)
- Yuri Petrovich Figatner - (1889 – executed 1937)
- Ivan Fioletov - (1884 – executed 1918)
- Lydia Fotiyeva - (1881 – 1975)
- Vladimir Fritsche - (1870 – 1929)
- Mikhail Frunze - (1885 – 1925)

Return to Table of Contents

== G ==
- Yakov Ganetsky - (1879 – executed 1937)
- Aleksei Gastev - (1882 – executed 1939)
- Sasha Gegechkori - (1887 – 1928)
- Anatoly Gekker - (1888 – executed 1937)
- Konstantin Gey - (1896 – executed 1939)
- Nikolai Gikalo - (1897 – executed 1938)
- Nikolai Glebov-Avilov - (1887 – executed 1937)
- Jacob Golos - (1889 – 1943)
- Filipp Goloshchyokin - (1876 – executed 1941)
- Serafima Gopner - (1880 – 1966)
- Boris Gorbachyov - (1892 – executed 1937)
- Nikolai Gorbunov - (1892 – executed 1938)
- Boris Gudz - (1902 – 2006)
- Sergey Ivanovich Gusev - (1874 – 1933)

Return to Table of Contents

== H ==
- Aleksander Hendrikson - (1895 – 1977)

Return to Table of Contents

== I ==
- Maria Iasneva-Golubeva - (1861 – 1936)
- Shaymardan Ibragimov - (1899 – 1957)
- Chingiz Ildyrym - (1890 – executed 1941)
- Andrei Ivanov - (1888 – 1927)
- Vladimir Ivanov - (1893 – executed 1938)

Return to Table of Contents

== J ==
- Älıbi Jangeldin - (1883 – 1953)
- Julius Janonis - (1896 – 1917)
- Nikolai Janson - (1882 – executed 1938)
- Jānis Jansons-Brauns - (1872 – 1917)
- Adolph Joffe - (1883 – 1927)
- Johannes Jürna - (1895 – 1930)

Return to Table of Contents

== K ==
- Lazar Kaganovich - (1893 – 1991)
- Mikhail Kaganovich - (1888 – 1941)
- Fedor Kalinin - (1882 – 1920)
- Mikhail Kalinin - (1875 – 1946)
- Ekaterina Kalinina - (1882 – 1960)
- Jānis Kalnbērziņš - (1893 – 1986)
- Lev Kamenev - (1883 – executed 1936)
- Olga Kameneva - (1883 – executed 1941)
- Grigory Kaminsky - (1895 – executed 1938)
- Kamo - (1882 – 1922)
- Semyon Kanatchikov - (1879 – ?)
- Lev Karakhan - (1889 – executed 1937)
- Lev Karpov - (1879 – 1921)
- Lavrenty Kartvelishvili - (1890 – executed 1938)
- Sergey Kavtaradze - (1885 – 1971)
- Benyamin Kayurov - (1876 – executed 1936)
- Mikhail Kedrov - (1878 – executed 1941)
- Platon Kerzhentsev - (1881 – 1940)
- Ferdinand T. Kettunen - (1889 – 1920)
- Mendel Khatayevich - (1893 – executed 1937)
- Tikhon Khvesin - (1894 – executed 1938)
- Alexandra Kim - (1885 – executed 1918)
- Viktor Kingissepp - (1888 – executed 1922)
- Kuprian Kirkizh - (1886 – 1932)
- Sergei Kirov - (1886 – 1934)
- Nikolay Kiryukhin - (1896 – 1953)
- Aleksei Kiselyov - (1879 – executed 1937)
- Arkadiy Kiselyov - (1880 – executed 1938)
- Gustav Klinger - (1876 – 1937)
- Vilhelm Knorin - (1890 – executed 1939)
- Pyotr Kobozev - (1878 – 1941)
- Ivan Kodatsky - (1893 – executed 1937)
- Nadezhda Kolesnikova - (1882 – 1964)
- Alexandra Kollontai - (1872 – 1952)
- Nikolay Komarov - (1889 – executed 1937)
- Grigory Korganov - (1886 – executed 1918)
- Stanisław Kosior - (1889 – executed 1939)
- Haykaz Kostanyan - (1898 – executed 1938)
- Alexei Kosterin - (1896 – 1968)
- Yuriy Kotsiubynsky - (1896 – executed 1937)
- Sergey Kovalev - (1886 – 1960)
- Innokentiy Kozhevnikov - (1879 – executed 1931)
- Mieczysław Kozłowski - (1876 – 1927)
- Grigory Kramarov - (1887 – 1970)
- Pyotr Krasikov - (1870 – 1939)
- Leonid Krasin - (1870 – 1926)
- Alexander Krasnoshchyokov - (1880 – executed 1937)
- Nikolay Krestinsky - (1883 – executed 1938)
- Alexander Krinitsky - (1894 – executed 1937)
- Harald Krumin - (1894 – 1943)
- Nadezhda Krupskaya - (1869 – 1939)
- Nikolai Krylenko - (1885 – executed 1938)
- Gleb Krzhizhanovsky - (1872 – 1959)
- Vladimir Ksandrov - (1877 – 1942)
- Ivan Ksenofontov - (1884 – 1926)
- Ivan Kulyk - (1897 – executed 1937)
- Béla Kun - (1886 – executed 1938)
- Vladimir Kurdyumov - (1895 – 1970)
- Dmitry Kursky - (1874 – 1932)
- Valerian Kuybyshev - (1888 – 1935)
- Dmitry Kuzmin-Karavayev - (1886 – 1959)
- Nikolai Kuzmin - (1883 – executed 1938)
- Emanuel Kviring - (1888 – executed 1937)

== L ==
- Nestor Lakoba - (1893 – 1936)
- Isaak Lalayants - (1870 – 1933)
- Kārlis Landers - (1883 – 1937)
- Mikhail Lashevich - (1884 – 1928)
- Jānis Lācis - (1897 – 1937)
- Martin Latsis - (1888 – executed 1938)
- Johannes Lauristin - (1899 – 1941)
- Sergey Lazo - (1894 – executed 1920)
- Dora Lazurkina - (1884 – 1974)
- Dmitry Lebed - (1893 – executed 1937)
- Pavel Lebedev-Polianskii - (1881 – 1948)
- Vladimir Lenin - (1870 – 1924)
- Olga Lepeshinskaya - (1871 – 1963)
- Dmitry Leshchenko - (1876 – 1937)
- Julian Leszczyński - (1889 – executed 1939)
- Martyn Liadov - (1872 – 1947)
- Zlata Lilina - (1882 – 1929)
- Maxim Litvinov - (1876 – 1951)
- Vissarion Lominadze - (1897 – 1935)
- Solomon Lozovsky - (1878 – executed 1952)
- Sargis Lukashin - (1883 – executed 1937)
- Fyodor Lukoyanov - (1894 – 1947)
- Anatoly Lunacharsky - (1875 – 1933)
- Yury Lutovinov - (1887 – 1924)
- Isidor Lyubimov - (1882 – executed 1937)
- Artemy Lyubovich - (1880 – executed 1938)
- Vladimir Lyuksemburg - (1888 – 1971)

== M ==
- Maksim Mager - (1897 – executed 1941)
- Konstantin Ivanovich Makarov - (1894 – 1918)
- Filipp Makharadze - (1868 – 1941)
- Roman Malinovsky - (1876 – executed 1918)
- Burhan Mansurov - (1889 – 1942)
- Dmitry Manuilsky - (1883 – 1959)
- Julian Marchlewski - (1867 – 1925)
- Vukašin Marković - (1874 – 1943)
- Ludwig Martens - (1874 – 1948)
- Magaza Masanchi - (1886 – 1938)
- Nikolay Matveyev - (1877 – 1951)
- Vladimir Mayakovsky - (1893 – 1930)
- Polikarp Mdivani - (1877 – executed 1937)
- Filipp Medved - (1890 – executed 1937)
- Mikhail Medvedev-Kudrin - (1891 – 1964)
- Alexei Medvedev - (1884 – executed 1937)
- Pavel Spiridonovich Medvedev - (1888 – 1919)
- Sergei Medvedev - (1885 – executed 1937)
- Konstantin Mekhonoshin - (1889 – executed 1938)
- Boris Melnikov - (1896 – executed 1938)
- Vyacheslav Menzhinsky - (1874 – 1934)
- Kirill Meretskov - (1897 – 1968)
- Vladimir Meshcheryakov - (1885 – 1946)
- Nikolai Meshcheryakov - (1865 – 1942)
- Stanislav Messing - (1890 – 1937)
- Valery Mezhlauk - (1893 – executed 1938)
- Illarion Mgeladze - (1890 – executed 1941)
- Alexander Miasnikian - (1886 – 1925)
- Pavel Mif - (1901 – executed 1939)
- Anastas Mikoyan - (1895 – 1978)
- Nikolay Alexandrovich Milyutin - (1889 – 1942)
- Vladimir Milyutin - (1884 – executed 1937)
- Solomon Mogilevsky - (1885 – 1925)
- Vyacheslav Molotov - (1890 – 1986)
- Pyotr Moskatov - (1894 – 1969)
- Ivan Moskvin - (1890 – executed 1937)
- Sergei Mrachkovsky - (1888 – executed 1936)
- Romuald Muklevich - (1890 – executed 1938)
- Alexander Muralov - (1886 – executed 1937)
- Nikolay Muralov - (1877 – executed 1937)
- Matvei Muranov - (1873 – 1959)
- Johannes-August Müürman - (1894 – 1938)
- Gavril Myasnikov - (1889 – executed 1945)

== N ==
- Theodor Nette - (1895 – 1926)
- Vladimir Nevsky - (1876 – executed 1937)
- Pyotr Nikiforov - (1882 – 1974)
- Iona Nikitchenko - (1895 – 1967)
- Aleksei Nikitin - (1870 – 1938)
- Klavdiya Nikolayeva - (1893 – 1944)
- Viktor Nogin - (1878 – 1924)

== O ==
- Valerian Obolensky - (1887 – executed 1938)
- Mikhail Olminsky - (1863 – 1933)
- Georgy Oppokov - (1888 – executed 1937)
- Mamia Orakhelashvili - (1881 – executed 1937)
- Sergo Ordzhonikidze - (1886 – 1937)
- Aleksandr Osatkin-Vladimirsky - (1885 – executed 1937)
- Konstantin Ostrovityanov - (1892 – 1969)
- Nikolai Ostrovsky - (1904 – 1936)
- Hayk Ovsepyan - (1891 – executed 1937)

== P ==
- Alexander Parkhomenko - (1886 – 1921)
- Evgeny Pashukanis - (1891 – executed 1937)
- Arvīds Pelše - (1899 – 1983)
- Jēkabs Peterss - (1886 – executed 1938)
- Peter Petroff - (1884 – 1947)
- Grigory Petrovsky - (1878 – 1958)
- Leonid Petrovsky - (1897 – 1941)
- Osip Piatnitsky - (1882 – executed 1938)
- Olga Pilatskaya - (1884 – executed 1937)
- Boris Pinson - (1892 – executed 1936)
- Valerian Pletnev - (1886 – 1942)
- Vadim Podbelsky - (1887 – 1920)
- Nikolai Podvoisky - (1880 – 1948)
- Mikhail Pokrovsky - (1868 – 1932)
- Pavel Poltoratskiy - (1888 – executed 1918)
- Hans Pöögelmann - (1875 – executed 1938)
- Alexander Poskrebyshev - (1891 – 1965)
- Pyotr Pospelov - (1898 – 1979)
- Pavel Postyshev - (1887 – executed 1939)
- Karolis Požela - (1896 – executed 1926)
- Boris Pozern - (1882 – executed 1939)
- Yevgeni Preobrazhensky - (1886 – executed 1937)
- Vitaly Primakov - (1897 – executed 1937)
- Dmitri Protopopov - (1897 – 1986)
- Vitovt Putna - (1893 – executed 1937)
- Georgy Pyatakov - (1890 – executed 1937)

== R ==
- Karl Radek - (1885 – 1939)
- Viktor Radus-Zenkovich - (1877 – 1967)
- Eino Rahja - (1885 – 1936)
- Jukka Rahja - (1887 – 1920)
- Christian Rakovsky - (1873 – executed 1941)
- Fyodor Raskolnikov - (1892 – 1939)
- Stanislav Redens - (1892 – executed 1940)
- Mikhail Reisner - (1868 – 1928)
- Afanasiy Remnyov - (1890 – 1919)
- Ren Fuchen - (1884 – 1918)
- David Riazanov - (1870 – executed 1938)
- Itska Rizhinashvili - (1886 – 1906)
- Arkady Rosengolts - (1889 – executed 1938)
- Theodore Rothstein - (1871 – 1953)
- Kustaa Rovio - (1887 – executed 1938)
- Karl Rozental - (1890 – 1983)
- Fricis Roziņš - (1870 – 1919)
- Elena Rozmirovich - (1886 – 1953)
- Filipp Rudkin - (1893 – 1954)
- Semyon Rudnev - (1899 – 1943)
- Jakob Rudnik - (1894 – 1963)
- Endre Rudnyánszky - (1885 – ?)
- Jānis Rudzutaks - (1887 – executed 1938)
- Dmitry Ryabyshev - (1894 – 1985)
- Alexei Rykov - (1881 – executed 1938)
- Martemyan Ryutin - (1890 – executed 1937)
- Oscar Ryvkin - (1899 – executed 1937)

== S ==
- Georgy Safarov - (1891 – executed 1942)
- Sahib-Garey Said-Galiev - (1894 – executed 1938)
- Jussi Sainio - (1880 – 1920)
- Timofei Sapronov - (1887 – executed 1937)
- Maximilian Saveliev - (1884 – 1939)
- Nikodim Schlegel - (1877 – ?)
- Alexander Schlichter - (1868 – 1940)
- Vasily Schmidt - (1886 – executed 1938)
- Kristjan Seaver - (1898 – 1941)
- Alexander Sedyakin - (1893 – executed 1938)
- Nikolai Semashko - (1874 – 1949)
- Alexander Serebrovsky - (1884 – executed 1938)
- Leonid Serebryakov - (1890 – executed 1937)
- Semyon Sereda - (1871 – 1933)
- Fyodor Sergeyev - (1883 – 1921)
- Danush Shahverdyan - (1882 – 1941)
- Vasyl' Shakhrai - (1888 – executed 1919)
- Lazar Shatskin - (1902 – executed 1937)
- Stepan Shaumian - (1878 – executed 1918)
- Efim Shchadenko - (1885 – 1951)
- Trifon Shevaldin - (1888 – 1954)
- Matvei Shkiryatov - (1883 – 1954)
- Alexander Shliapnikov - (1885 – executed 1937)
- Dmitry Shmidt - (1896 – executed 1937)
- Alexander Shotman - (1880 – executed 1937)
- Pavel Shternberg - (1865 – 1920)
- Boris Shumyatsky - (1886 – executed 1938)
- Konstantin Shvedchikov - (1884 – 1952)
- Nikolai Shvernik - (1888 – 1970)
- Rudolf Sivers - (1892 – 1918)
- Ephraim Sklyansky - (1892 – 1925)
- Maria Skobtsova - (1891 – 1945)
- Mykola Skrypnyk - (1872 – 1933)
- Ivan Skvortsov-Stepanov - (1870 – 1928)
- Vera Slutskaya - (1874 – 1917)
- Józef Smaga - (1896 – 1982)
- Pyotr Smidovich - (1874 – 1935)
- Ivar Smilga - (1892 – executed 1937)
- Aleksandr Petrovich Smirnov - (1877 – executed 1938)
- Ivan Smirnov - (1881 – executed 1936)
- Pyotr Smirnov - (1897 – executed 1939)
- Vladimir Smirnov - (1887 – executed 1937)
- Pyotr Smorodin - (1897 – executed 1939)
- Grigory Sokolnikov - (1888 – 1939)
- Sofia Sokolovskaya - (1894 – executed 1938)
- Tatiana Solomakha - (1892 – executed 1918)
- Aaron Soltz - (1872 – 1945)
- Lev Sosnovsky - (1886 – executed 1937)
- Suren Spandaryan - (1882 – 1916)
- Joseph Stalin - (1878 – 1953)
- Leonid Stark - (1889 – 1937)
- Elena Stasova - (1873 – 1966)
- Yuri Steklov - (1873 – 1941)
- Jan Sten - (1899 – executed 1937)
- Aleksei Stetskii - (1896 – executed 1938)
- Boris Stomonyakov - (1882 – executed 1940)
- Pēteris Stučka - (1865 – 1932)
- Ivan Sturua - (1870 – 1931)
- Daniil Sulimov - (1891 – executed 1937)
- Avetis Sultan-Zade - (1889 – executed 1938)
- Hamid Sultanov - (1889 – executed 1938)
- Alexander Svanidze - (1886 – executed 1941)
- Yakov Sverdlov - (1885 – 1919)
- Sergey Syrtsov - (1893 – executed 1937)

== T ==
- Adolf Taimi - (1881 – 1955)
- Alexander Tarasov-Rodionov - (1885 – executed 1938)
- Viktor Taratuta - (1881 – 1926)
- Ivan Teodorovich - (1875 – executed 1937)
- Sahak Ter-Gabrielyan - (1886 – 1937)
- Alexey Tereshkov - (1893 – 1960)
- Nikolay Tolmachyov - (1895 – 1919)
- Vladimir Tolmachyov - (1887 – executed 1937)
- Mikhail Tomsky - (1880 – 1936)
- Ilya Trainin - (1886 – 1949)
- Valentin Trifonov - (1888 – executed 1938)
- Mikhail Trilisser - (1883 – executed 1940)
- Leon Trotsky - (1879 – 1940)
- Alexander Troyanovsky - (1882 – 1955)
- Kote Tsintsadze - (1887 – 1930)
- Alexander Tsiurupa - (1870 – 1928)
- Ilya Tsivtsivadze - (1881 – 1938)
- Mikhail Tskhakaya - (1865 – 1950)
- Alexander Tsulukidze - (1876 – 1905)

== U ==
- Ieronim Uborevich - (1896 – executed 1937)
- Nikolai Uglanov - (1886 – executed 1937)
- Konstantin Ukhanov - (1891 – executed 1937)
- Vasiliy Ulrikh - (1889 – 1951)
- Dmitry Ilyich Ulyanov - (1874 – 1943)
- Anna Ulyanova - (1864 – 1935)
- Maria Ilyinichna Ulyanova - (1878 – 1937)
- Iosif Unshlikht - (1879 – executed 1938)
- Moisei Uritsky - (1873 – 1918)

== V ==
- Stepan Vaganov - (1886 – 1918)
- Nikolai Valentinov - (1880 – 1964)
- Artur Vallner - (1887 – executed 1939)
- Iosif Vareikis - (1894 – executed 1938)
- Mikhail Vasilyev-Yuzhin - (1876 – executed 1937)
- Vladimir Vilensky-Sibiryakov - (1888 – 1942)
- Alexander Vinokurov - (1869 – 1944)
- Mikhail Vladimirsky - (1874 – 1951)
- Pyotr Voevodin - (1884 – 1964)
- Vladimir Voitinsky - (1885 – 1960)
- Boris Volin - (1886 – 1957)
- Aleksei Volkov - (1889 – 1942)
- V. Volodarsky - (1891 – 1918)
- Voldemar Vöölmann - (1887 – executed 1937)
- Aleksandr Voronsky - (1884 – executed 1937)
- Kliment Voroshilov - (1881 – 1969)
- Vatslav Vorovsky - (1871 – 1923)
- Pyotr Voykov - (1888 – 1927)

== W ==
- Anna Weisman - (1875 – 1942)

== Y ==
- Genrikh Yagoda - (1891 – executed 1938)
- Iona Yakir - (1896 – executed 1937)
- Vasily Yakovlev - (1885 – executed 1938)
- Yakov Yakovlev - (1896 – executed 1938)
- Varvara Yakovleva - (1884 – executed 1941)
- Xösäyen Yamaşev - (1882 – 1912)
- Yemelyan Yaroslavsky - (1878 – 1943)
- Mark Yelizarov - (1863 – 1919)
- Avel Yenukidze - (1877 – executed 1937)
- Vasily Yesin - (1888 – 1960)
- Grigory Yevdokimov - (1884 – executed 1936)
- Yefim Yevdokimov - (1891 – executed 1940)
- Nikolai Yezhov - (1895 – executed 1940)
- Yi Wijong - (1884 – 1924)
- Yakov Yurovsky - (1878 – 1938)

== Z ==
- Vladimir Zagorsky - (1883 – 1919)
- Leonid Zakovsky - (1894 – executed 1938)
- Ivan Zalkind - (1885 – 1928)
- Pyotr Zalutsky - (1887 – executed 1937)
- Yevgeny Zamyatin - (1884 – 1937)
- Volodymyr Zatonsky - (1888 – executed 1938)
- Isaak Zelensky - (1890 – executed 1938)
- Rosalia Zemlyachka - (1876 – 1947)
- Yakov Zevin - (1888 – executed 1918)
- Andrei Zhdanov - (1896 – 1948)
- Tengiz Zhghenti - (1887 – 1937)
- Grigory Zinoviev - (1883 – executed 1936)
- Vyacheslav Zof - (1890 – executed 1937)
- Prokopy Zubarev - (1886 – executed 1938)

== See also ==
- Russian Revolution
- Communist Party of the Soviet Union
- Bibliography of the Russian Revolution and Civil War
- Bibliography of Stalinism and the Soviet Union
- Outline of the Russian Revolution and Civil War
- Index of articles related to the Russian Revolution and Civil War
