= Bobrovsky (surname) =

Bobrovsky (Russian: Бобровский, feminine: Bobrovskaya, Russian: Бобровская) is a Russian surname. Bobrovský (feminine: Bobrovská) is a Czech surname. Bobrovskyi (feminine: Bobrovska) is a Ukrainian surname. They are ultimately derived from the Russian and Ukrainian word бобер (bober) and the Czech word bobr, meaning 'beaver' and phonetic transliteration of the Polish surname Bobrowski. Notable people with the surname include:

- Cecilia Bobrovskaya (1873–1960), Russian revolutionary and memoirist
- Elena Bobrovskaya (born 1975), Kyrgyz athlete
- Jan Bobrovský (born 1945), Czech basketball player
- Sergei Bobrovsky (born 1988), Russian ice-hockey player
- Solomiia Bobrovska (born 1989), Ukrainian politician and civic activist
- Vladimir Bobrovsky (1873–1924), Russian Bolshevik revolutionary
- Zdeněk Bobrovský (1933–2014), Czech basketball player

== See also ==
- Bobrovsky (disambiguation)
