= Babrauskas =

- Lithuanian surname
- m.: Babrauskas
- f.: (married): Babrauskienė
- Related names: Bobrowski, Bobrovsky

Babrauskas is a Lithuanian surname. Notable people with the surname include:

- Benediktas Babrauskas (1910–1968), Lithuanian writer, poet, critic, and public figure
- Dita Babrauskaitė, birth name of Dita Želvienė (born 1968), Lithuanian swimmer and coach
- Steponas Babrauskas (born 1984), Lithuanian professional basketball coach and former player
