= Jacob Peters =

Jacob Peters may refer to:

- Jēkabs Peterss or Jacob Peters, Latvian Communist revolutionary
- Jacob Peters (swimmer), British swimmer
