= Minsk electoral district =

Constituency of the Russian Republic

Minsk
- Former Civilian constituency for the All-Russian Constituent Assembly
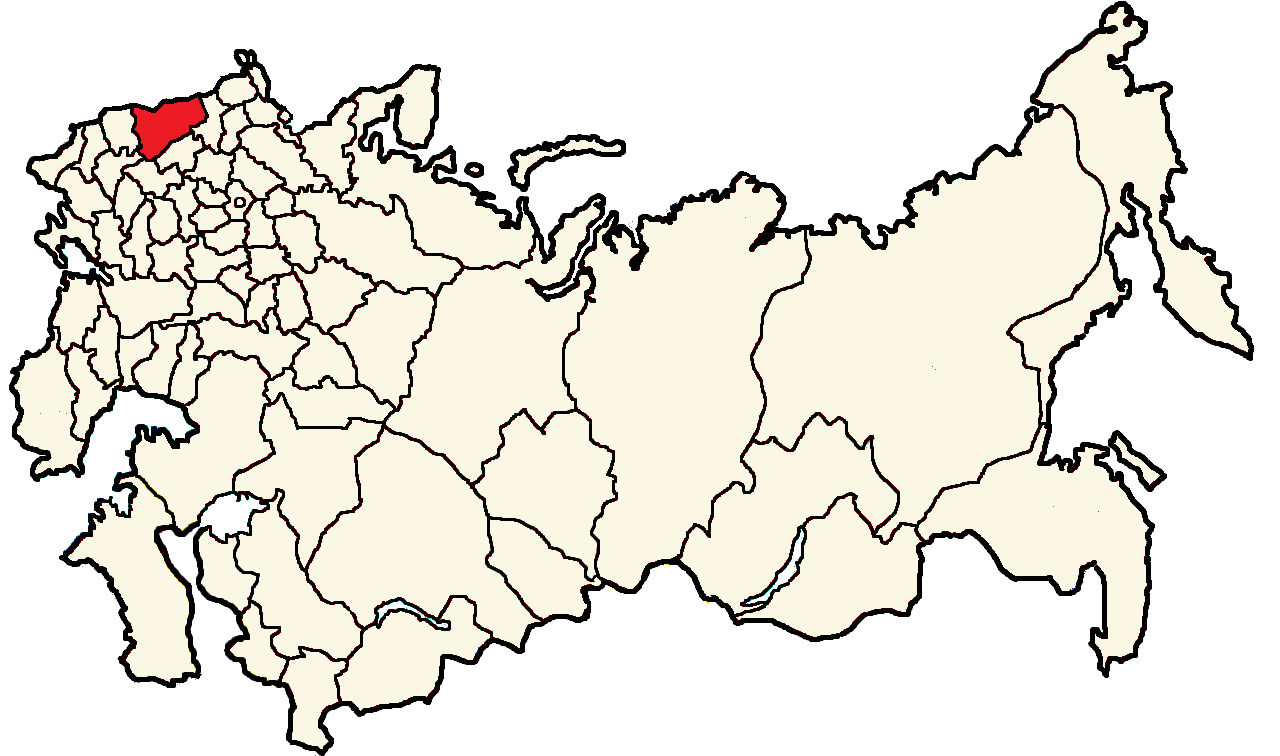

Former constituency
- Created: 1917
- Abolished: 1918
- Number of members: 16
- Number of Uyezd Electoral Commissions: 11
- Number of Urban Electoral Commissions: 2
- Number of Parishes: 204

The Minsk electoral district (Russian: Минский избирательный округ) was a constituency created for the 1917 Russian Constituent Assembly election.

The electoral district consisted of the Minsk Governorate and the parts of the Vilna Governorate and the Kovno Governorate that were not under German occupation. Notably, the soldiers based in the garrison in Minsk voted in the Western Front electoral district rather than the Minsk electoral district.

White Russian separatism was a negligible force in the electoral district. The conservative press reported a quiet and orderly election in the province.

The most voted list in the city of Minsk was the Jewish National Electoral Committee, which obtained 12,688 votes (35.5%), followed by the Bolsheviks with 9,521 votes (26.7%), the Polish list 4,242 votes (11.9%), Menshevik-Bund 2,870 votes (8%), Kadets 2,057 votes (5.8%), Poalei-Zion 1,463 votes (4.1%), Russian Democrats 1,446 votes (4.1%), SRs 977 votes (2.7%), United Jewish Socialist Labour Party 278 votes (0.8%), Gromada 160 votes (0.4%) and Landowners 49 voters.

== Results ==
According to U.S. historian Oliver Henry Radkey, whose account is used for the results table below, stated that his count of the result in Minsk was largely complete, only lacking 3 out of 25 volosts in Mozyrsky Uyezd. These 3 volosts had 16,755 eligible voters. Per Soviet historian L. M. Spirin, there were two lists (List no. 4 - Kalinkavichy Soviet of Peasants Deputies and List no. 7 - Unity) that were registered but did not figure in the vote count.

Minsk
Party	Vote	%
List 9 - Bolsheviks	579,087	63.13
List 12 - Bloc of Socialist-Revolutionaries and the Soviet of Peasants Deputies	181,673	19.81
List 2 - Jewish National Electoral Committee	65,046	7.09
List 8 - Polish Electoral Committee	36,882	4.02
List 5 - Mensheviks-Bund	16,277	1.77
List 6 - Kadets	10,724	1.17
List 11 - Russian Democratic Party	10,040	1.09
List 10 - Jewish Soc.-Dem. Labour Party (Poalei Zion)	6,184	0.67
List 1 - United Socialist Jewish Labour Party (S.S. and E.S.)	4,880	0.53
List 3 - Union of Landowners	3,465	0.38
List 13 - Belarusian Socialist Assembly	2,998	0.33
Total:	917,256	

Deputies Elected
Balay	SR
Drizo	SR
Gamzagurdi	SR
Nesterov	SR
Brutzkus	Jewish National Electoral Committee
Alibekov	Bolshevik
Freiman	Bolshevik
Gromashevsky	Bolshevik
Kozhuro	Bolshevik
Krivoshein	Bolshevik
Lander	Bolshevik
Schlegel	Bolshevik
Seleznev	Bolshevik
Taganov	Bolshevik
