= Maria Golubeva =

Maria Golubeva may refer to:

- Maria Golubeva (1861-1936), Russian revolutionary
- Marija Golubeva (born 1973), Latvian politician and political scientist
