= Korean Democratic Corps =

1920–1921 Korean militant activist group

- Leader: Kim Gyu-moon
- Founded: March 12, 1919
- Dissolved: June 1922
- Country: Korea
- Allegiance: Provisional Government of the Republic of Korea
- Headquarters: Chomojeongja, Hunchun-hyeon; Shinhanchon, Primorsky Krai, Russia.
- Ideology: Korean independence movement Protestantism
- Size: 700
- Part of: Korean Socialist Party

- Korean Democratic Corps
- Hangul: 대한신민단
- Hanja: 大韓新民團
- Revised Romanization: Daehansinmindan
- McCune–Reischauer: Taehansinmindan

The Korean Democratic Corps (Korean: 대한신민단), also known as the Shinminhoe, Daehan Shinminhoe, or Shinmindan, was a Protestant-affiliated armed independence movement group organized in Vladivostok, Primorsky Krai and East Manchuria in March 12, 1919. It was led by Director Kim Gyu-myeon, Vice Director Han Gwang-taek, General Affairs Director Choi Sang-jin, Finance Director Lee Jon-su, and Foreign Affairs Director Kim Deok-bo were appointed.

== History ==
When the March 1st Declaration of Independence was proclaimed, they attempted to expand their organization in order to prepare for an independence war and effectively develop a cultural movement to seize the country. Afterwards, about 40 district organizations and 20,000 members were secured in Manchuria, Noryeong, and Korea. They instilled patriotism in their members through educational activities, and opened the way for them to study by creating farmers' movements and food industry cooperatives.

Meanwhile, two branches were newly established as an independent army, with Wangcheong-hyeon branch having Kim Jun-geun as leader, Park Seung-gil as commander and chief of staff, and Honchun-hyeon branch having Commander Han Gyeong-se as commander and chief of staff. To strengthen the military, rifles, pistols, and ammunition were purchased with military funds collected from North Hamgyong Province, Gando, and Russian territory, and armed about 500 independence fighters. About 200 soldiers were stationed and active in Lisu-gu, Hunchun County and Jangdong, Wangqing County.

In April 1919, the corps merged with the Korean Socialist Party (대한신민단; 大韓新民團) at the second representative congress of Korean Socialist Party. In early 1920, they advanced into the country in the Gangnam area of Duman, raised military funds, and attacked Japanese military posts. This group was one of eight organizations in the North Gando Armed Independence Movement, and on October 20, 1920, it integrated 250 troops into the army under the 1st Regiment Commander Hong Beom-do and made a remarkable contribution in the Battle of Wanlu-gu and Orangchon. In May, it was transferred to the 4th Battalion of the Korean Northern Army Command. On June 4, about 30 troops attacked Japanese Army units in North Hamgyong Province Gangyang-dong (강양동; 江陽洞), marking the beginning of the Battle of Fengwudong. In October, he joined Hong Beom-do's Korean Independence Army and participated in the Battle of Cheongsanri. Afterwards, Kim Seong-bae was dispatched as a representative of the Korean People's Assembly to a rally for the formation of the Korean Independence Corps held in Mirsan in December, but it did not achieve any significant results.

As the Free City Incident occurred and Japan's ruthless campaign to sweep away independence forces unfolded, the Honchun branch, along with the Wangcheong branch, went into exile and moved to Noryeong. Afterwards, while working for military training and promoting independence ideology, in December 1922, the Lenin government notified of the order of disbandment and disarmament.

As a result, it split into the Jaeso faction of Han Gyeong-se and Moon Seong-ryong and the Manchurian faction of Kim Kyu-sik, and in retaliation against the Soviet Union, Kim Gyu-sik killed three Soviet soldiers. As a result of this incident, Han Gyeong-se and Moon Seong-ryong were arrested and imprisoned, and the Jaesopa group was disbanded. And Kim Gyu-sik's group escaped to Manchuria and attempted to resume the independence movement, but it was soon disbanded.

== Activities ==
Although it was not a large-scale independence movement organization, it raised 30,000 won for military funds for the independence army in May 1920, and during the Battle of Fengwudong, Yi Heung-su led about 60 members. Hong Beom-do led the combined unit of the Korean Northern Military Command at the Battle of Cheongsanri. He also participated in battles and carried out an armed struggle against Japan. He also dispatched Lee Hyeon-su, Hyeon Eul-sun, Seo Seong-du, and Kim Deok-seon to Korea to raise military funds.

== See also ==
- Korean Independence Movement
  - List of militant Korean independence activist organizations
- Korean Independence Army
- Korean Socialist Party
