= Bobrowski =

Bobrowski (Polish pronunciation: [bɔˈbrɔfski]; feminine: Bobrowska; plural: Bobrowscy) is a Polish-language surname. Variants of the name are also common in Belarus, Ukraine and Russia. It is a toponymic surname derived from the placenames Bobrowa, or Bobrowo. The placenames are derived from the noun bobrъ ("beaver" in Slavic languages).

Notable people with the name include:

- Alicja Bobrowska (1936–2025), Polish model and actress, Miss Polonia in 1957
- Czesław Bobrowski (1904–1996), Polish economist
- Johannes Bobrowski (1917–1965), German poet
- Stefan Bobrowski (1840–1863), Polish politician
- Szymon Bobrowski (born 1972), Polish actor
- Tadeusz Bobrowski (1829–1894), Polish social activist

== Related surnames ==
Language	Masculine	Feminine
Polish	Bobrowski	Bobrowska
Belarusian (Romanization)	Баброўскі (Babroŭski)	Баброўская (Babroŭskaja, Babrouskaya)
Lithuanian	Babrauskas	Babrauskienė (married); Babrauskaitė (unmarried)
Russian (Romanization)	Бобровский (Bobrovsky, Bobrovskiy, Bobrovskij)	Бобровская (Bobrovskaya, Bobrovskaia, Bobrovskaja)
Ukrainian (Romanization)	Бобровський (Bobrovskyi, Bobrovskyy, Bobrovskyj)	Бобровська (Bobrovska)

== See also ==
- Bobrovsky (disambiguation)
