= Korean Socialist Party =

1918–1921 Soviet Union political party

- Founder: Yi Dong-hwi
- Founded: 11 May 1918
- Dissolved: January 1921
- Merger of: Korean Democratic Corps
- Succeeded by: Korean Communist Party
- Headquarters: Kalinina 18, Khabarovsk, Khabarovsk Krai, Soviet Russia
- Newspaper: Jayujong
- Armed wing: Korean Red Guards; Korean Democratic Corps
- Ideology: Socialism; Left wing nationalism
- International affiliation: Comintern

Korean Socialist Party

Korean name
- Hangul: 한인사회당
- Hanja: 韓人社會黨
Transcriptions
- Revised Romanization: Hanin sahoedang
- McCune–Reischauer: Hanin sahoedang

Russian name
- Russian: Корейская социалистическая партия

The Korean Socialist Party (Korean: 한인사회당) was a socialist party of Korea.

== History ==
The party was founded in 1918 in Khabarovsk, Soviet Russia. In April 1919, the party merged with the Korean Democratic Corps (대한신민단; 大韓新民團) at the second representative congress of Korean Socialist Party. The establishment of the party was supported by the local Bolshevik authority in the Russian Far East, represented by the likes of Alexander Krasnoshchyokov and Alexandra Kim. In 1921, the party merged with Korean communist groups of Irkutsk and was renamed as the Korean Communist Party.
