= Bobrovskoye, Vologodsky District, Vologda Oblast =

Bobrovskoye Бобровское
- Village
- Location within Vologda Oblast Location within Russia
- Coordinates: 59°38′N 39°01′E
- Country: Russia
- Region: Vologda Oblast
- District: Vologodsky District
- Time zone: UTC+3:00

Bobrovskoye (Russian: Бобровское) is a rural locality (a village) in Novlenskoye Rural Settlement, Vologodsky District, Vologda Oblast, Russia. The population was 2 as of 2002.

== Geography ==
Bobrovskoye is located 86 km northwest of Vologda (the district's administrative centre) by road. Bilibino is the nearest rural locality.
