= Pavel Poltoratskiy =

Pável Gerásimovich Poltorátskiy
- Павел Герасимович Полторацкий
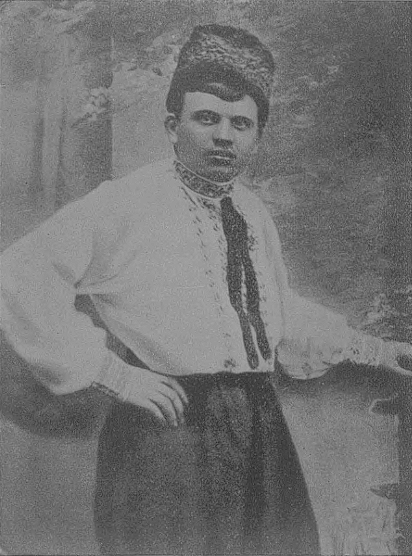
- Born: 1888; Novocherkassk
- Died: 1918; Merv
- Cause of death: Executed by firing squad
- Citizenship: Russian

Pável Gerásimovich Poltorátskiy (c. 1888, Novocherkassk – 21 July 1918) (Russian: Павел Герасимович Полторацкий) was a Bolshevik revolutionary. He served as People's Commissar for Labor in the early Turkmen Soviet Socialist Republic and as editor of the daily newspaper Sovetskiy Turkmenistan.

Poltoratskiy worked as a typesetter. He became active as a revolutionary in Rostov-on-Don and Baku, but was imprisoned in 1913. In 1917 he became chairman of the Soviet established in Kogon, Uzbekistan. He was sent as a delegate to the First All-Russian Congress of Workers' and Soldiers' Deputies' Soviets. According to another source, he was also a railroad worker.

== Career ==
Poltoratskiy traveled from Tashkent to Merv, arriving 13 July 1918, leading a small group of revolutionaries. He was soon taken captive by the Transcaspian Government which had recently been formed by Mensheviks and Socialist Revolutionaries. He was executed by firing squad near a brickyard in Merv on 21 July 1918.

== Legacy ==
From 17 July 1919 until 27 October 1927 the capital city of Turkmenistan, Ashgabat, was named Poltoratsk in his honor.
