= Cecilia Bobrovskaya =

Cecilia Samoylovna Bobrovskaya (Russian: Цецилия Самойловна Бобровская, née Zelikson [Зеликсон]; 19 September 1873 [O.S. 7 September] – 6 July 1960) was an early Bolshevik activist, revolutionary, and memoirist. She played a notable role in various local organizations of the Bolshevik Party – consequently facing repeated persecution by the authorities of the Russian Empire. Bobrovskaya is best known for her memoirs, Twenty Years in Underground Russia: Memoirs of a Rank-and-File Bolshevik (1934).

== Biography ==
Bobrovskaya, née Cecilia Samoylovna Zelikson, was born into the family of Samuil Zelikson, an observant Jewish bookkeeper whom she described as preoccupied with his "Talmudic and philosophic researches," and his wife, a significantly younger Jewish woman, in Velizh, a provincial Russian town in the Vitebsk Guberniya (now Smolensk Oblast, Russia).

Bobrovskaya stepped into the Russian socialist current as a student in Warsaw in the 1890s. She entered into the Russian Social Democratic Labour Party (RSDLP) in 1898, and sided with its Bolshevik faction following the intra-party division into the Bolshevik and Menshevik camps in 1903. She met her husband, Vladimir Bobrovsky, during their mutual involvement in political work against the czarist regime.

Bobrovskaya was first arrested in Kharkov in 1900. After a period in Switzerland in 1902, she returned to Russia, choosing Tver as a center of activity following an arrest in St. Petersburg. She first met with Lenin, then based in the Swiss city of Geneva, in 1902, during her work as an agent of the Iskra, the party newspaper Lenin had founded in 1900, and, together with her husband Vladimir, followed the party's work to the Caucasus. In 1905, she was arrested by the police while on her way to the party's conference in Moscow. Arrested in Moscow again after an illegal party gathering outside the city in June 1908, Bobrovskaya spent two years in exile in Vologda, being spared, according to her later recollection of the episode, from the harsher sentence of four years of internal exile in eastern Siberia on account of her poor state of health.

Bobrovskaya was involved in the Serpukhov and Moscow party committees during 1917, and participated in the 1917 October Revolution. From March 1919 to May 1920, Bobrovskaya led the military affairs council of the Bolshevik Party's Moscow branch.

She worked for the Comintern between 1918 and 1940, and was a member of the Institute of Marxism-Leninism under the Central Committee of the Communist Party of the Soviet Union, the party's central theoretical and research institute, in later years. She died in Moscow in 1960.

Bobrovskaya wrote down a number of personal accounts of the revolution and remembrances of such figures as Lenin and Nadezhda Krupskaya, and others. Her best known work, the memoir Twenty Years in Underground Russia: Memoirs of a Rank-and-File Bolshevik, documenting in first person her role in the revolutionary movement from 1894 to 1914, was published in Moscow in 1934 and is cited as a primary source on the pre – World War I period by both Soviet and Western historians.
