= Konstantin Ivanovich Makarov =

Bolshevik revolutionary (1894–1918)

Konstantin Ivanovich Makarov (Russian: Константин Иванович Макаров; 1894 – 15 May 1918) was a Soviet revolutionary and Putilov worker, member of the RSDLP since 1917.

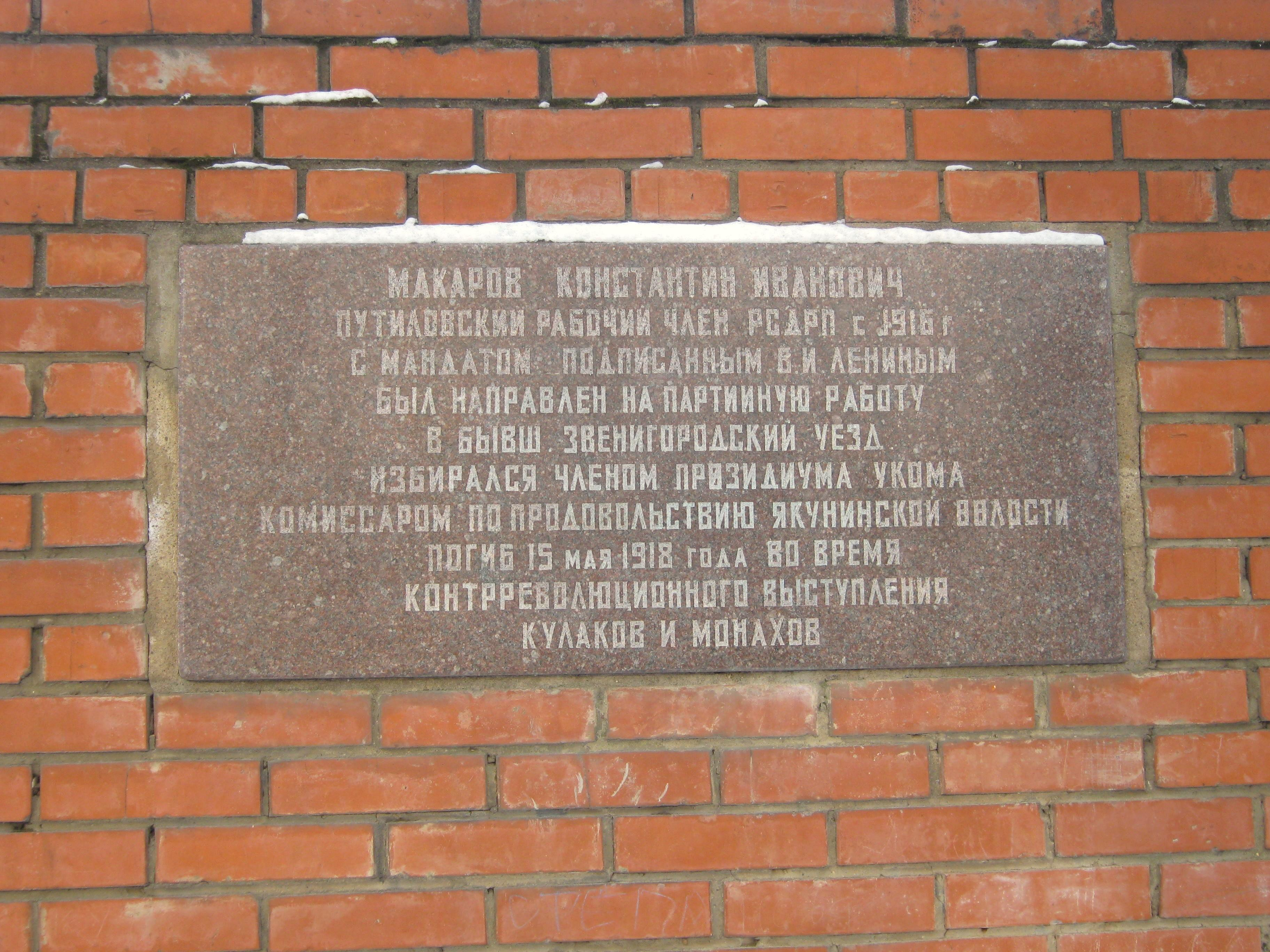
Memorial plaque on Makarov Street in Zvenigorod

Makarov was born in the family of a peasant in the village Yagunino, Yaguninskaya Volost, Zvenigorod Uyezd, Moscow Governorate. At twelve, he became a bookseller in a shop in the city of Berdychiv, in the Kiev Governorate. He lived and worked in Berdychiv for 7 years. After that, Makarov moved to the city of Kamenets-Podolsk, where he worked as a bookseller. Before the War of 1914, he came to his parents in his native village. In addition to land tilling, his parents were also engaged in handicraft, here Makarov was trained in turning work. He moved to Petrograd and became a Putilov worker.

In 1917, Makarov joined the Bolshevik Party. Then the Putilov organization sent him as a revolutionary propagandist to the Chernigov Governorate. On the way, he drove home where the campaign began by choice in the Russian Constituent Assembly, in which he took an active part, at rallies in 3 villages (Munino (Russian: Мунино), Shikhovo (Russian: Шихово) and Savvinskaya Sloboda (Russian: Саввинская Слобода)) he argued to the peasants about the need to vote for list No. 5. He was elected to the Volispolkom (Ispolkom (Executive Committee) of the Volost), then to the Uispolkom (Ispolkom (executive committee) of the Uyezd). The Uispolkom appointed him the chairman of the Uyezd Committee.

Later, he was appointed a commissioner of economy of the former Savvino-Storozhevsky Monastery. In this position, he had to face the monks who were on the territory of the monastery, who had prepared an uprising in May 1918. During the uprising the infuriated mob brutally beat Makarov and threw him into the pond. Makarov tried to get out of the pond, but someone from the crowd shot him with a revolver and killed him.

After his death, his old parents and his two children remained. At the request of his parents, Makarov was buried on church territory of Savvinskaya Sloboda. During the Zvenigorod uprising, two more of his assistants were shot along with Makarov: Yakov Rotnov and Vasily Dmitrievich Sokolov. There was an attempt to overthrow the Soviet usurpers in Zvenigorod, but already on 16 May the Zvenigorod uprising was suppressed.

His name is one of the streets of Zvenigorod; a memorial plaque is installed.
