= Harald Krumin =

Latvian Soviet journalist and economist

Harald Krumin (Latvian: Haralds Krūmiņš; Russian: Гаральд Иванович Крумин; 21 July 1894 – 17 May 1943) was a Latvian Soviet journalist, economist and editor.

== Biography ==
=== Early life and career ===
Krumin was born in the family of a village teacher. In 1905, he graduated from the parish school and entered the Riga Gymnasium.

He was a member of the Latvian Social Democratic Labor Party (RSDLP(b)) from 1909.

In 1910, Krumin was searched for illegal Marxist literature and was expelled from the gymnasium and sent under the supervision of a local priest to the island of Ezel, where he continued to study at the local gymnasium. However, in 1912, he was also expelled from this gymnasium for "uncharitableness".

In 1913, he graduated from the gymnasium in Pernov (Pärnu). He entered the Faculty of History and Philology of St. Petersburg University. He was one of the active members of the party organization of the Latvian Bolshevik district "Prometheus" in St. Petersburg. He published articles, notes, and correspondence in Pravda.

In 1916, after graduating from the historical and philological faculty of Petrograd University, he was again persecuted and lived illegally in Pskov. In 1916, in Moscow, he worked in the underground Latvian district (Northern Group) of the Moscow Committee of the RSDLP(b) and the Presnensky Committee of the RSDLP(b).

=== Russian Revolution ===
After the February Revolution of 1917, together with a group of prominent Latvian revolutionaries, he organized the publication of the Latvian Bolsheviks' organ, the newspaper "Social Democrat" and became a member of its editorial staff.

During the October Revolution of 1917, he was a member of the Moscow District Military Revolutionary Committee, a member of the Latvian Revolutionary Center in Moscow. He headed the editorial staff of "Izvestia VRK Gorodsky District" of Moscow, collaborated in the newspaper "Derevenskaya Pravda".

From March 1918, he was the head of the editorial and publishing department of the Supreme Council of the National Economy of the RSFSR and the editor of the magazine "Narodnoe hozyaztyo".

=== Soviet functionary ===
From September 1919 to June 1929, he was the editor-in-chief of the newspaper "Economic Life". In 1921-1922, he was a member of the Council of Labor and Defense of the RSFSR.

From August 1928 to July 1930, Krumin was a member of the Editorial Bureau of the Pravda newspaper. From July 1930 to April 1931 he served as editor-in-chief of the newspaper Izvestia.

From May 1931, he was the deputy chairman of the Ural Regional Control Commission of the Communist Party of Ukraine (b). From 1932 to January 1934 he was Chairman of the Ural Regional Planning Commission and Deputy Chairman of the Executive Committee of the Ural Regional Council.

From January 1934 to August 1935, he was the chairman of the Chelyabinsk Regional Planning Commission and the deputy chairman of the executive committee of the Chelyabinsk Regional Council.

From August 1935 to 1937, he was the deputy editor-in-chief of the Great Soviet Encyclopedia, editor-in-chief of the magazine Problems of Economics, a lecturer at the Higher School of Party Organizers under the Central Committee of the All-Union Communist Party of Ukraine (b) and lecturer at the Correspondence Study Institute under the Central Committee of the All-Union Communist Party of Ukraine (b).

=== Arrest and death ===
In January 1938, Krumin was arrested by the NKVD authorities for his connections with Robert Eikhe and Jānis Rudzutaks. He denied all accusations of treason but was convicted by the Military Board of the Supreme Court of the Soviet Union and sentenced to 10 years of imprisonment in correctional labor camps. He served his sentence in the Kotlas camp in the Komi ASSR, where he died on May 17, 1943.

Harald Krumin was posthumously rehabilitated in 1955.
