= Alexander Muralov =

Soviet Agriculturalist and Politician

Alexander Ivanovich Muralov (Russian: Алексáндр Ивáнович Мурáлов; 14 June 1886 – 30 October 1937) was a Soviet agriculturist and politician. He was the younger brother of revolutionary and Soviet military leader Nikolai Muralov.

== Biography ==
Muralov was one of 11 children, whose parents had a small farm near Taganrog. He joined the Bolshevik faction of the Russian Social Democratic Labour Party in 1905. Two of his brothers, and two sisters were also Bolsheviks. In 1906 he entered Moscow University. In his student years, he was arrested for revolutionary activities.

After graduating from the university in 1912–1915 he worked in the Kashirsky district of the Tula province as a local zemstvo agronomist and head of the laboratory of the Verkhnedneprovsky experimental field.

In 1915 he came to Serpukhov and after the February Revolution was elected to the Serpukhov Soviet of Workers' Deputies. From October 1917 to 1919 Muralov was Chairman of the Aleksinsky District Bolshevik Committee and the District Executive Committee.

In 1919 he was appointed provincial military commissar of Tula and commandant of the Tula fortified area. From 1920 to 1923 – Chairman of the Moscow, then Donetsk economic councils and from 1923 to 1928 he was Chairman of the Nizhny Novgorod Provincial Executive Committee.

In the years 1928–1929 Muralov was deputy commissar and from 1930 to 1933 he served as People's Commissar of Agriculture of the RSFSR. From 1933 to 1936 he was Deputy People's Commissar of Agriculture of the USSR and Chairman of the Committee for Resettlement.

Muralov was Vice President (1930–1935) and then President of VASKhNIL (1935-1937). One of the theorists and leaders of collectivization in the countryside, he took part in drawing up the first five-year plan for the development of agriculture in the RSFSR.

He was also a member of the All-Russian Central Executive Committee and the Central Executive Committee of the Soviet Union.

In July 1937 Muralov was arrested on charges of sabotage and being involved in an underground counter-revolutionary organization. On 21 October 1937, his name was included on a death list signed by Stalin, Molotov, Kaganovich and Voroshilov. He was tried and convicted on October 29 of the same year, and sentenced to capital punishment. On 3 September 1938 Muralov was shot on 30 October 1937. He was rehabilitated in 1956. A street in the city of Aleksin bears the name of Muralov.

Alexander Muralov was the author of many scientific works on agrochemistry and agriculture. Under his editorship, the first yearbook "Agriculture of the USSR" was published.

Muralov's wife, Valentina Kuzmina, a teacher, died in 1923 from appendicitis. Their daughter, Yulia (born 1918) was arrested on 28 April 1938, for allegedly belonging to "an anti-Soviet student group whose parents were repressed", and was sentenced to five years in a labour camp. His brother, Nikolai, was shot on 1 February 1937.
