= Alexandra Kim =

Korean Russian revolutionary (1885–1918)

- Александра Петровна Ким
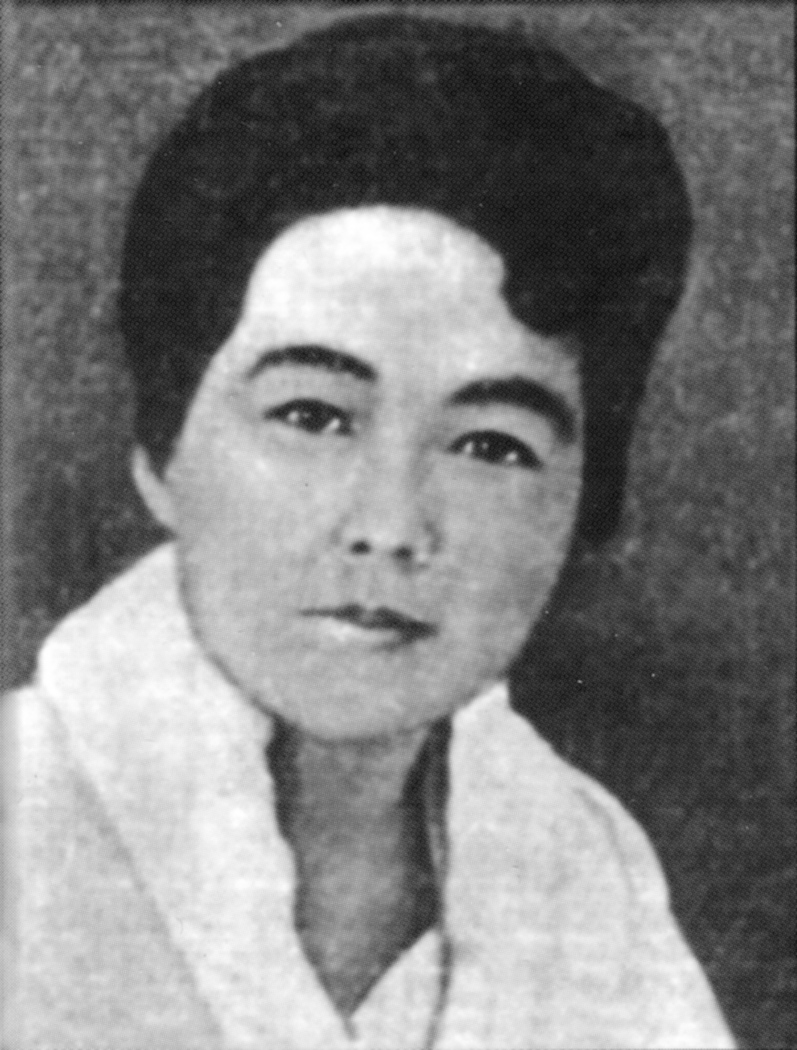
- Kim c. 1917
- Born: 22 February [O.S. 10 February] 1885; Sinelnikovo, Amur region, Russian Empire
- Died: 16 September 1918 (aged 33); Khabarovsk, Russian State
- Political party: Russian Social Democratic Labour Party
- Spouse: Jozef Stankevich's son (divorced)

Alexandra Petrovna Kim (Russian: Александра Петровна Ким; born Kim Aerim; February 22, 1885 – September 16, 1918) was a revolutionary political activist of Korean descent. Having joined the Bolsheviks in 1916, she is recognized as the first Korean communist.

== Early life ==
Kim Aerim was born in Sinelnikovo, a Korean village in Siberia. At the time, the area was a hotbed of Korean nationalism. In 1869, her father, Kim Du Suh, had emigrated to Russia, adopting the name Piotr Kim and converting to Orthodox Christianity. He worked as a translator. Later he went to Manchuria to work as an interpreter on the railway. In 1895, Alexandra joined him in China. Soon after her arrival in China, Kim Du Suh died. Alexandra was adopted by Jozef Stankevich, a Russian friend of her father. She attended a girls school in Vladivostok, Siberia. After finishing her education, she began working as a teacher in a primary school. She married Stankevich's son.

== Political activism ==
Kim gave up teaching and moved back to Vladivostok, where she took part in political activities for the cause of Korean migrants.

Her marriage did not last long. She divorced her husband and shifted to the Urals region. In the Urals she began political activism. In 1916, she joined the Russian Social Democratic Labour Party (Bolsheviks). In 1917, Lenin sent her back to Siberia to mobilize Koreans there against the counter-revolutionary forces and the Allied Expeditionary Forces.

In Khabarovsk she was in charge of external affairs at the Far-Eastern Department of the Party. There she met with Yi Dong-Wi, Kim Rip and other Korean independence fighters. Together they founded the Korean Socialist Party in Khabarovsk on April 28, 1918.

== Capture ==
Kim was captured, along with many other Korean communists, by White forces and Japanese troops on September 4, 1918. She was executed on September 16, 1918. Reportedly, her last words were "Freedom and Independence for Korea!"

== Recognition ==
On 29 September 2008, a memorial evening dedicated to Alexandra Petrovna Kim-Stankevich was held. As part of the event, a presentation was given for the book Alexandra Petrovna Kim-Stankevich. Essays, Documents, and Materials (Moscow, 2008), compiled by Boris Dmitrievich Pak and his daughter Bella Borisovna Pak.

== Bibliography ==
- Pan Pyong Yul. The Life and Activities of Kim Alexandra Petrovna (Stankevich): A Short Biography of the First Korean Communist Yun Pyong Sok Kyosu Hwangapkinyom Hanguk Kundaesa Nonchong, Seoul, 1990.
- Pak Hwan. Kim Alexandra Petrovna (Stankevich), Leader of Korean Socialist Party Hanguksahan Nonchong, Seoul, 1992.
- Boris Pak, Bella Pak. Alexandra Petrovna Kim-Stankevich. Essays. Documents and materials. - Institute of Oriental Studies RAS, 2008. - 248 p. - 500 copies. - ISBN 978-5-89282-313-5 /Александра Петровна Ким-Станкевич. Очерки, документы и материалы. М. Институт востоковедения РАН, 2008/.
