= Tatiana Solomakha =

Russian revolutionary (1892–1918)

- Татьяна Соломаха
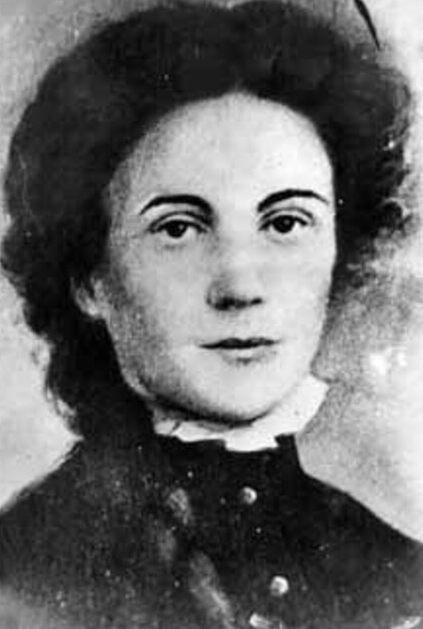

Commissar for Food Supplies
- In office 1917 – 7 November 1918
- Preceded by: Office established

Personal details
- Born: Tatiana Grigorievna Solomakha; 1892 Poputnaya (village), Labinsk Department, Kuban Oblast, Russian Empire
- Died: 7 November 1918 (aged 25–26) Poputnaya (village), Russian SFSR
- Citizenship: Soviet
- Party: Russian Social Democratic Labour Party (1916–1917); Russian Social Democratic Labour Party (Bolsheviks) (1917–1918); Russian Communist Party (Bolsheviks) (1918)

Tatiana Grigorievna Solomakha (Note: Russian: Татья́на Григо́рьевна Солома́ха, romanized: Tat'yána Grigór'yevna Solomákha, IPA: [tɐˈtʲjanə ɡrʲɪˈɡorʲjɪvnə səlɐˈmaxə].) (1892 – 7 November 1918) was a Russian revolutionary of Cossack origin, a Bolshevik and a participant in the Russian Civil War and the establishment of Soviet power in the Kuban. Solomakha was captured by the White Guards and killed along with 19 others on 7 November 1918, making her one of the victims of the White Terror.

== Early life ==
Solomakha was born into the family of a rural teacher in the village of Poputnaya. She studied at the women's gymnasium in Armavir, and after graduating in 1910 began working as a teacher. The same year, Solomakha's father was fired from his school when he was deemed unreliable by a priest. As the eldest child, Solomakha became the family breadwinner.

== Revolutionary activity ==
Solomakha was a partial participant in the Russian Revolution of 1905 at age 12–13. During World War I, Solomakha actively worked among front-line soldiers returning to the village. In 1916, she became a member of the Bolshevik Party, and in the February Revolution of 1917 she spoke at meetings and campaigned for the Bolsheviks. The following year, Solomakha joined the Red Army in the midst of the Russian Civil War.

At the first meeting of the Revolutionary Committee, Solomakha was appointed Commissar for Food Supplies. In the fall of 1918, the Red Army men retreated from Poputnaya along with Solomakha. Near Stavropol, she fell ill with typhus. While sick, she was captured during the night by White Guards from Anton Denikin's Volunteer Army at the Blagodarny farm, near the village of Kazminsky. She was forcibly returned to the village of Poputnaya, Solomakha, along with other sick Red Army men, was thrown into prison. For three weeks, the prisoners were beaten with ramrods and whips, while being pressured into changing sides. During one of the torture sessions Solomakha exclaimed:

The Soviets are coming soon, and your days are numbered. Our blood will not be shed in vain… Soviet power cannot be killed!

On the night of 7 November 1918, Solomakha and her comrades were executed. Solomakha was killed last, first, they cut off her hands, then her legs, then her head.

== Personal life ==
Solomakha was a bibliophile. One of her favorite books was Ethel Voynich's novel The Gadfly. She read other revolutionary works; Solomakha first became acquainted with the works of Vladimir Lenin after a student who spent the night in her house gave her a book, on the cover of which was written “Lenin”.

== Family ==
She came from a revolutionary family. Her mother, Natalia Semyonovna Solomakha, was also killed by Denikin's Volunteer Army troops on 7 November 1918, on the same day as her daughter. Tatiana's brothers, Nikolai G. Solomakha and Grigory G. Solomakha, were executed in Mozdok. Her sister was Raisa G. Solomakha and her father was Grigory Solomakha.
