= Mikhail Trilisser =

Soviet intelligence officer (1883–1940)

Mikhail Trilisser Михаил Трилиссер

Head of the Foreign Department of the GPU/OGPU
- In office May 13, 1922 – October 27, 1929
- Preceded by: Solomon Mogilevsky
- Succeeded by: Stanislav Messing

Personal details
- Born: April 1, 1883 Astrakhan, Russian Empire
- Died: February 2, 1940 (aged 56) Moscow, Russian SFSR, Soviet Union
- Party: Russian Communist Party (1918–1937)
- Other political affiliations: RSDLP (Bolsheviks) (1901–1918)

Mikhail Abramovich Trilisser (Russian: Ме́ер Абра́мович Трили́ссер; born Meier Abramovich Trilisser) (1 April 1883 – 2 February 1940), also known by the pseudonym Moskvin (Russian: Москви́н), was a chief of the Foreign Department of the Cheka, i.e. the State Political Directorate or GPU, and then the OGPU of the Russian Soviet Federative Socialist Republic. Later, he worked for the NKVD as a covert bureau chief and Comintern leader.

== Background ==
Trilisser was born Meier Abramovich Trilisser on April 1, 1883, in Astrakhan to a Jewish family, his father working as a shoemaker.

== Career ==
=== Pre-revolution ===
In 1901, Trilisser joined the Russian Social Democratic Labour Party in Odessa and was arrested in the same year for revolutionary activities.

During the revolution of 1905, he was a revolutionary propagandist in Kazan, Petrograd and Finland. In July 1907, the police arrested him, investigated him at length and sentenced him in 1909 to eight years of hard labour. In November 1914 during this sentence, the government sent him into permanent exile in Siberia.

=== Revolution ===
After the February Revolution of 1917, Trilisser served first as editor of the Irkutsk newspaper Voice of the Social-Democrat and then in the military Irkutsk Committee of the Bolsheviks.

=== Intelligence ===
In October 1917, Trilisser worked in Siberia. As the Bolsheviks regained territory in the Far East from the Japanese, Trilisser worked underground in the Russian-Chinese border town of Blagoveshchensk, north of Harbin. After helping form a buffer state, the Far Eastern Republic (FER) or Chita Republic (1920–1922), Trilisser was appointed commissioner of the Amur region.

=== Cheka ===
By 1921, Trilisser was working under Felix Dzerzhinsky in the foreign intelligence department of the Soviet secret police or Cheka. In 1922, he became head of the foreign department of the new State Political Directorate or GPU (later OGPU).

As such, Trilisser played a significant role in the "Trust" operation, among whose achievements were penetration of counter-Soviet and White Russian organizations and the capture and executions of Boris Savinkov and British super spy Sidney Reilly.

=== OGPU ===
In 1926, Trilisser became vice-chairman of the OGPU.

In October 1929, he was ousted from the foreign department of the OGPU, and was replaced by Artur Artuzov. Trilisser was dismissed for attacking his boss, Genrikh Yagoda, behind his back at a Party meeting—a breach of protocol.

Trilisser was possibly associated with Georgy Chicherin. In Paris, Chicherin and Trilisser may have organized a Soviet subsidy for Nicholas Roerich's expeditions in Central Asia.

In 1930, Stalin had him transferred to the Workers and Peasants Inspection of the RSFSR as deputy commissar. In 1934–1935, he was representative of the Soviet Control Commission in the Far East.

=== Comintern and NKVD ===
Replacing Osip Pyatnitsky, on 10 August 1935, Trilisser was appointed a member of the Executive Committee of the Comintern, and became head of its Department of International Relations (OMS), which handled subsidies to foreign communist parties. Trilisser adopted the pseudonym, Mikhail Aleksandrovich Moskvin. When Stalin queried this, his deputy Lazar Kaganovich explained that it was "because his surname is known as that of an NKVD functionary". Trilisser developed ciphers to disguise Communist activities. His tasks as a Comintern member appear to have been those of a policeman rather than a communist agitator, including the recruitment of NKVD agents overseas and the kidnapping or assassination of various Soviet emigres, Comintern members and other 'enemies of the people'. Another of Trilisser's tasks was to recruit covert couriers to supply funds, training, and political support to various overseas communist movements deemed sympathetic to the Soviet Union. In January 1936, he was tasked with verifying loyalty of all the Comintern staff and emigre communists in the USSR. By August, he had identified 3,000 possible 'saboteurs, spies, provocateur agents, etc." whose names were passed to the NKVD, also described as a purge of the Comintern.

=== United States ===
In the United States, Trilisser provided Soviet visas for couriers sent to supply funds to left-wing trade unions, African-American worker organizations, and communist movements, including the CPUSA. In January 1938, at the request and recommendation of Earl Browder, head of the Communist Party of the United States, Trilisser gave Max Bedacht, an American Communist Party activist and former unsuccessful New York Senate candidate, a Soviet visa and employment as a courier supplying funds to the CPUSA and communist front organizations. Bedacht soon began traveling between the United States, Europe, and the Soviet Union as a courier, using his official cover as an international delegate for the American Communist Party.

== Purge and death ==
Trilisser evidently came into conflict with the NKVD boss Genrikh Yagoda, which led to his dismissal in 1929, but that meant that he was trusted by Yagoda's successor Nikolai Yezhov and survived the mass arrests of NKVD officers that followed Yagoda's dismissal. He was arrested on 23 November 1938, as Lavrentiy Beria was wresting control of the NKVD from Yezhov. His sudden disappearance shocked the head of Comintern, Georgi Dimitrov, who tried to intervene, but was warned by Yezhov that 'Moskvin' was suspected of having been 'entrapped' into becoming a spy. He was executed on 2 February 1940.

== Legacy ==
In 1956, Trilisser was posthumously rehabilitated during the period of Destalinization.

In 1967, a Soviet adventure TV series Operation Trust (Операция "Трест") was created.

In 1983, his character appears in the final episodes of Reilly, Ace of Spies, portrayed by an English actor Anthony Higgins.

== External sources ==
- Directing the Purges and supervising the NKVD
- Starkov, Boris A. "The trial that was not held". Vol. 46, no. 8.
