= Stanislav Messing =

Soviet intelligence officer (1890-1937)

Stanislav Messing Станислав Мессинг
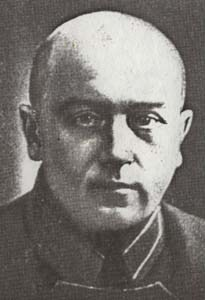

Acting Head of the Foreign Department of the OGPU
- In office October 27, 1929 – July 31, 1931
- Preceded by: Mikhail Trilisser
- Succeeded by: Artur Artuzov

Personal details
- Born: 1890 Warsaw, Russian Empire
- Died: September 2, 1937, Moscow, USSR Moscow, RSFSR, Soviet Union
- Party: Russian Communist Party
- Other party: Social Democracy of the Kingdom of Poland and Lithuania

Military service
- Allegiance: Russian Empire (1913–1917); Russian Soviet Federative Socialist Republic (1917–1922); Soviet Union (1922–1934)
- Battles/wars: World War I Russian Civil War

Stanislav Adamovich Messing (Russian: Станислав Адамович Мессинг; 1890, in Warsaw, Russian Empire – September 2, 1937, in Moscow, USSR) was a Soviet national party leader and a leader of the Soviet state security and intelligence bodies. He was a member of the Central Control Commission of the CPSU(b) from 1930 to 1934.

== Early life ==
Stanislav Messing was born into a Jewish family, the child of a musician and a midwife (accoucheuse). Due to financial difficulties, he only finished four classes in grammar school, after which he studied to become a locksmith. He eventually began working in a printing house.

== Career ==
In 1908, he joined the Social Democratic Party of Poland, where he met Felix Dzerzhinsky and Józef Unszlicht, who had given him patronage after the Great Revolution of 1917. He was arrested several times and imprisoned in the Warsaw Fortress. In the same year, he was sentenced to administrative deportation to Belgium, where he earned his livelihood as an unskilled laborer. In 1911, Messing returned to his homeland and continued to participate in the activities of the Social Democratic Party of Poland. He was arrested again and then released.

In 1913, he was drafted into the army and served in Turkestan as a common soldier of the 17th Turkestan Regiment, which had been based at the Caucasian Front since 1914. In 1917, he was elected a member of the regimental soldiers' committee.

=== Petrograd and Moscow ===
In the spring of 1917, during the Russian revolution, Messing was in Moscow and participated in street unrest. Immediately after the revolution he was appointed secretary of the Sokolniki Executive Committee and chairman of the Sokolniki District Cheka. Beginning in December 1918, Messing was the head of the secret operations department of the Moscow Cheek. In July 1920, he was approved a member of the VChK Council. On January 3, 1921, he was appointed chairman of the Moscow Cheka. and in November of that year become chairman of Leningrad, then still called Petrograd

=== Petrograd ===
In November 1921, Felix Dzerzhinsky, who directed the Red Terror during post-revolution Russia, appointed Messing as chairman of the Petrograd Cheka. He held this rank from November 3, 1921, to February 6, 1922. Petrograd was a capital of Russia until 1922; in 1922, Moscow became the capital again.

== Moscow ==
In 1929, implicated in Bukharin-Kamenev affair and the poor health conditions of Mezhinsky, Mikhail Trilisser lost out against Messing and Messing was appointed as second deputy chairman of OGPU.
