= Western Front electoral district =

Constituency of the Russian Republic

The Western Front electoral district (Russian: округе Западного фронта) was a constituency created for the 1917 Russian Constituent Assembly election. The electoral district covered the Western Front of the Russian Army.

== Results ==
Western Front
Party	Vote	%
List 9 - Bolsheviks	653,430	66.95
List 12 - Socialist-Revolutionaries and the Soviet of Peasants Deputies of the Armies of the Western Front	180,582	18.50
List 1 - Ukrainian SRs and Ukrainian Social Democratic Labour Party	85,062	8.72
List 2 - Muslim Socialists	16,846	1.73
List 3 - Kadets	16,750	1.72
List 5 - Mensheviks-Bund	5,622	0.58
List 4 - Belorussian Socialist Party (Gromada) and the Congress of Belorussian Soldiers of the Western Front	4,380	0.45
List 6 - Russian Democratic Party	3,055	0.31
List 10 - Bloc of Popular Socialists, Unity and right-wing SRs (based around the Volya Naroda newspaper)	2,840	0.29
List 7	?	
List 8	?	
List 11	?	
Unaccounted	7,433	0.76
Total:	976,000	

Deputies Elected
Bazyak	Ukrainian Bloc
Lebedinets	Ukrainian Bloc
Morgenstiern	SR
Nikolayev	SR
Zetel-Zusman	SR
Anuchin	Bolshevik
Apeter	Bolshevik
Fedenev	Bolshevik
Ksenofontov	Bolshevik
Kukonkov	Bolshevik
Lysyakov	Bolshevik
Miasnikian	Bolshevik
Rogozinsky	Bolshevik
Grzelszczak	Bolshevik
Tikhmenev	Bolshevik
Vasiliev	Bolshevik
Yakovlev	Bolshevik

The result for Muslim Socialists stems from a newspaper report in Russkiye Vedomosti, which had data from 472 out of 602 voting centres.
