= Jēkabs Peterss =

Latvian communist revolutionary

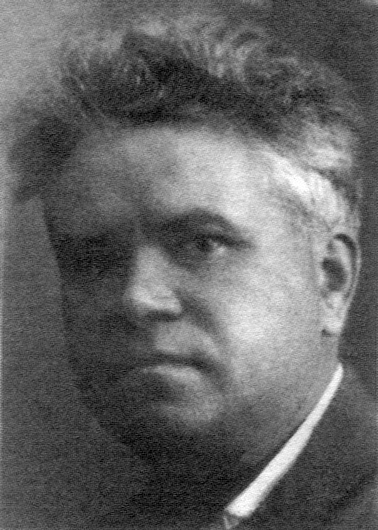

Deputy Chief of the Cheka
- In office 20 December 1917 – 7 July 1918
- Prime Minister: Vladimir Lenin
- Preceded by: Position established
- Succeeded by: Himself
- In office August 22, 1918 – 27 March 1919
- Preceded by: Himself
- Succeeded by: Ivan Ksenofontov

Acting Chief of the Cheka
- In office July 7 – 22 August 1918
- Preceded by: Felix Dzerzhinsky
- Succeeded by: Felix Dzerzhinsky

Chief of Petrograd Defense
- In office March 1919 – August 1919

Chief of Kiev Defense
- In office August 1919 – August 1919
- Preceded by: Position established

Chief of Tashkent Cheka
- In office 1920–1926

Chief of East Department of the GPU/OGPU
- In office 2 June 1922 – 31 October 1929

Chairman of Moscow Control Commission of Party
- In office 1930–1934
- Prime Minister: Vyacheslav Molotov

Personal details
- Born: 21 November [O.S. 3 December] 1886 Brinken district, Kreis Hasenpoth, Courland Governorate, Russian Empire
- Died: 25 April 1938 (aged 51) Kommunarka shooting ground, Moscow Oblast, Soviet Union
- Citizenship: Russian Empire (1886–1917); Russian Soviet Federative Socialist Republic (1917–1922); Soviet Union (1922–1938)
- Party: All-Union Communist Party (Bolsheviks) (1917–1937)
- Other political affiliations: Latvian Social Democratic Workers' Party (1904–1917); Communist Party of Latvia (1909–1917); British Socialist Party (1909–1917)
- Spouse: May Freeman (m 1910s-1917)
- Children: Maisie (daughter)
- Education: none
- Profession: Statesman and revolutionary

Jēkabs Peterss (Russian: Я́ков Христофо́рович Пе́терс, Yakov Khristoforovich Peters, English: Jacob Peters; 3 December [O.S. 21 November] 1886 – 25 April 1938) was a Latvian Communist revolutionary and politician who played a part in the establishment of the Soviet Union. Together with Felix Dzerzhinsky, he was one of the founders and chiefs of the Cheka, the secret police of Soviet Russia. He was the Deputy Chairman of the Cheka from 1918 and briefly the acting Chairman of the Cheka from 7 July to 22 August 1918.

== Early years ==
He was born on 3 December 1886 in Brinken volost of Kreis Hasenpoth, Courland Governorate (now Nīkrāce parish, Skrunda Municipality), the son of Latvian farmers. He became a member of the Latvian Social Democratic Workers' Party in 1904. In the aftermath of the Russian Revolution of 1905 he was arrested in March 1907 for the attempted murder of a factory director in Libau, but was later acquitted by the Riga military court in 1908. Peterss emigrated to England and lived in London, where he was a member of the London Group of the Social Democracy of Latvia and of the British Socialist Party.

=== The Siege of Sidney Street ===
Peterss was a first cousin of Fritz Svaars, a Latvian anarchist, who was suspected of sabotage, robbery and of the murders of a shopkeeper and a policeman during the 1905 revolution, and was arrested and tortured in Riga, but escaped early in 1906. He moved to London, and was one of a gang who tried to rob a jeweler's shop in Houndsditch, in December 1910. Caught in the act, they killed three unarmed police officers. Svaars and a fellow anarchist were traced to a house in Sidney Street in January 1911, and opened fire on the police, setting off the Siege of Sidney Street which ended with the deaths of both suspects. Peterss was arrested at his home in Turner Street, London, on 22 December. Unlike his cousin, he did not attempt to resist arrest. In May 1911, he and three other Latvian emigres were tried in the Old Bailey. The judge ordered the jury to acquit Peterss on the charge of murder, for lack of evidence. After he had given evidence under cross-examination, he was acquitted of the separate charge of conspiring to commit a burglary.

=== Family ===
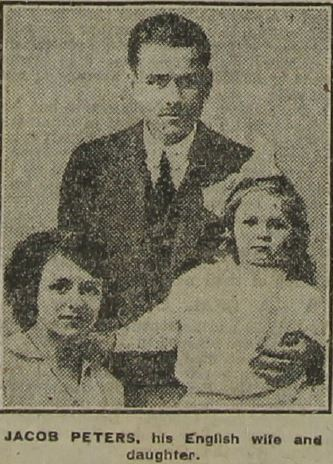
Jēkabs Peterss with his English wife and daughter taken ca October 1918

In 1916, he married May Freeman, the daughter of a London banker, by whom he had already fathered a daughter, Maisie Peters-Freeman (born 1914). After the October Revolution, he invited his wife and daughter to join him there, where they discovered that he had a new family. Maisie never left Russia and died there in 1971.

== October Revolution ==
Peterss returned to Russia in May 1917 after the February Revolution. In Riga, Peterss became one of the leaders of the Social Democracy of Latvia working at the front-lines of the Northern Front. During the German advance he moved to Valmiera where he was an editor of the party newspaper Cīņa. Peterss was a peasant representative of the Governorate of Livonia to the Democratic discussion initiated by Kerensky.

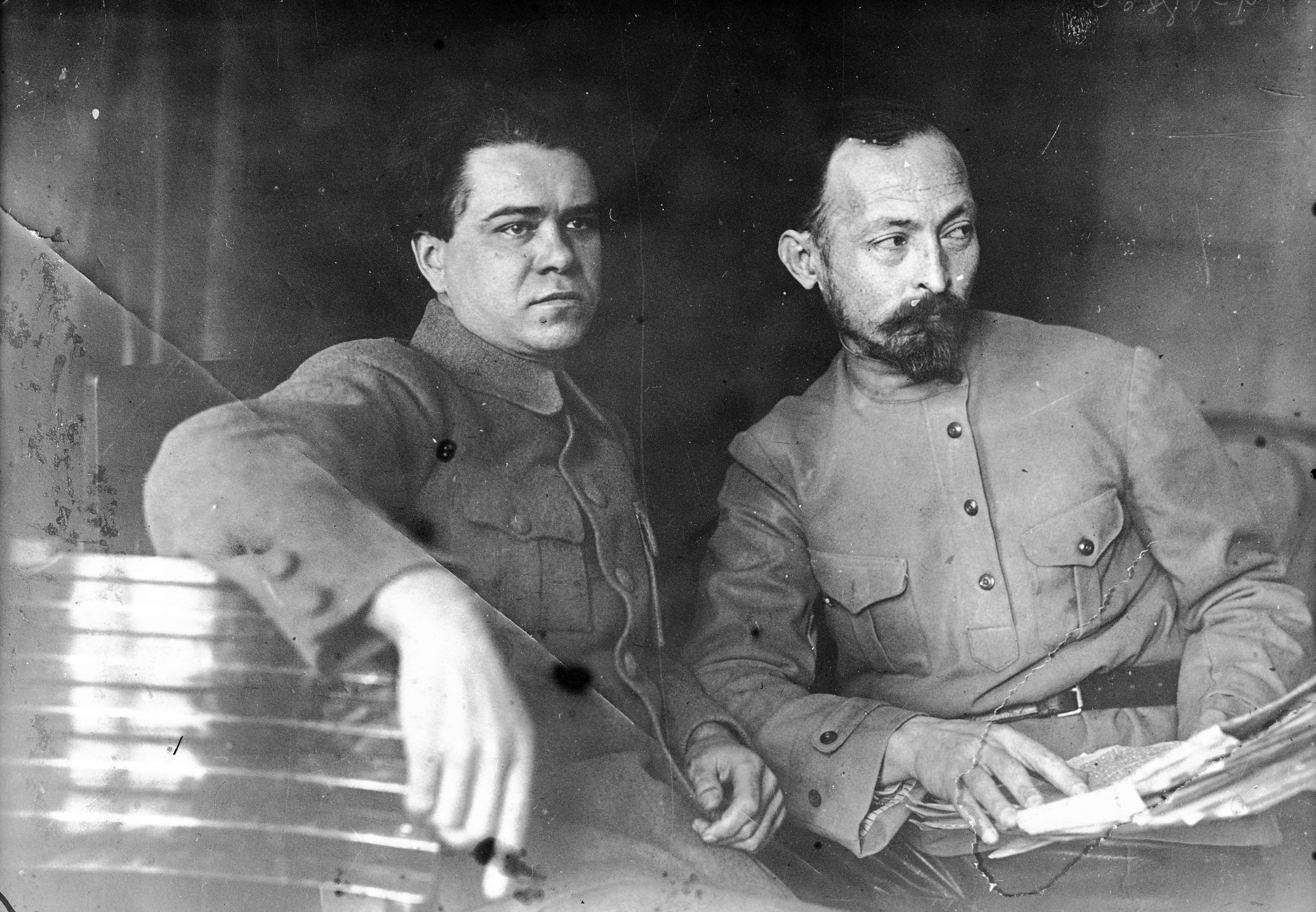
Peters with Felix Dzerzhinsky

Moving to Petrograd, he actively participated in the Bolshevik revolution of October 1917 as a member of the Military-Revolutionary Committee in Petrograd. At that time he was preparing military units for the October Revolution. Afterward, he was a member of Cheka Collegiate, the Deputy Chairman of the Commission, the deputy head of the Moscow Cheka, and the chairman of the Revolutionary Tribunal. He participated in the disclosure of the alleged Lockhart plot as well as leading the liquidation of the Left SR mutiny of 1918. Following Dzerzhinsky's resignation in the aftermath of the Left SR Uprising, assassination of Mirbach, and the Treaty of Brest-Litovsk, Peterss briefly served as the acting chief of the Cheka from 7 July 1918 until Dzerzhinsky resumed his duties on 22 August 1918. As one of the Cheka's leaders, Peterss was responsible for the first major Cheka operations involving killings. These were against alleged anarchists in Petrograd and later in May 1918 against anarchists in Petrograd and Moscow. He also was involved in the investigation of the SR attempt on Lenin's life in August 1918 (Fanny Kaplan case), for the indiscriminate Red Terror campaigns and reprisals that followed. He called it a "Hysterical Terror" in the newspaper "Utro Moskvy" (#21) of November 4, 1918. During these times appeared a term "room of souls" in numerous prisons such as Butyrka.

In March 1919, he was appointed as the Chief of internal defense in Petrograd, and then the Commandant of the reinforced raion. Following the retreat of the Yudenich forces he was appointed as the Commandant of the reinforced raion in Kiev in August 1919. Upon the sack of Kiev he was a member of the Military Council in Tula. In winter 1919–20 Peters became the deputy chairman of the Special Committee of the STO in providing military preparations on railways.

== Post-revolution ==
In 1920, he represented the Cheka in the Northern Caucasus and served there as the Commissar of the Northern Caucasus Railways. There is a story that when workers in Rostov-on-Don came to him complaining about starvation, Peters told them: "Is this famine, when your Rostov garbage pits are chock-full of various garbage and leftovers? In Moscow, where the garbage pits are completely empty and clean - as if they had been licked clean - there is hunger there!"

In 1922, for the direct command of military operations in Bukhara, RKKA commander S.S. Kamenev and Peterss were sent to purge the Bukhara party, military, and militia of Pan-Turkist and Pan-Islamist elements. Responding to Enver Pasha, the Soviet administration under the Turkestan Front, commanded by N. Kakurin and P. Pavlov, organized 2 cavalry brigades, 2 cavalry squadrons, and 1 rifle division, with roughly 7,500–8,000 soldiers and 20 machine guns. Peterss, and one of the first commanders of the Communist Party, along with S. Kamenev, commander of the RSFSR, were sent to Buhara to conduct operations against Enver.

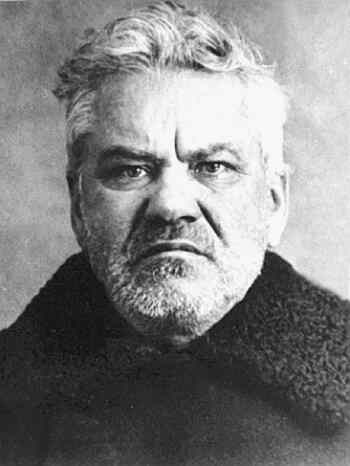
Jēkabs Peterss after arrest by NKVD, 1937

During the Great Purge, as a part of the so-called "Latvian Operation", Peterss was arrested in December 1937, and then executed by the NKVD on April 25, 1938, at the Kommunarka shooting ground. He was posthumously rehabilitated in 1956.

== Reputation ==
In 1919, an American diplomat testified to Congress that Peterss was, with another Cheka leader Aleksandr Eiduk, considered the "most blood-thirsty monster in Russia". At that time, Peterss' influence was vastly overstated by English language newspapers, because he was known to the police in the UK, and because he was the only one of the founders of the Cheka who spoke excellent English. On 25 January 1919, The Times in London belatedly learnt that the Bolsheviks had been divided over whether to conduct a revolutionary war with Germany, and claimed that "One party is headed by Lenin, the other by Trotsky, Peterss, Radek and Zinovieff...The Trotsky and Peters party believe in heroic measures..." Peterss did not merit a mention in any of Trotsky's extensive writings about the period, and certainly was not in the front ranks of the Bolsheviks leadership. As a Chekist, he undoubtedly had many people killed, yet the portrayal of him as 'the most blood-thirsty monster' contrasts with the opinion of the British diplomat, Robert Bruce Lockhart, who spent a month under arrest in Moscow in 1918 and was interrogated by Peterss. Bruce Lockhart wrote:

He told me strange tales of his experiences as a revolutionary. He had been in prison in Riga in Tsarist days. He showed me his nails as a proof of the torture which he had undergone. There was nothing in his character to indicate the inhuman monster he is commonly supposed to be. He told me that he suffered physical pain every time he signed a death sentence. I believe it was true. There was a strong streak of sentimentality in his nature, but he was a fanatic as far as the clash between Bolshevism and capitalism was concerned, and he pursued his Bolshevik aims with a sense of duty which was relentless.

== See also ==
- Outline of the Russian Revolution and Civil War
- Bibliography of the Russian Revolution and Civil War
- Bibliography of Stalinism and the Soviet Union
- Index of Old Bolsheviks
- Index of articles related to the Russian Revolution and Civil War
- Peter the Painter, a possible alternate identity of Peterss' while in England.
