= Bobrovsky =

Bobrovsky (Russian: Бобровский; masculine), Bobrovskaya (Бобровская; feminine), or Bobrovskoye (Бобровское; neuter) is the name of several rural localities in Russia:

- Bobrovsky, Kaluga Oblast, a settlement in Khvastovichsky District of Kaluga Oblast
- Bobrovsky, Kemerovo Oblast, a settlement in Kalininskaya Rural Territory of Mariinsky District of Kemerovo Oblast
- Bobrovsky, Khanty-Mansi Autonomous Okrug, a settlement in Khanty-Mansiysky District of Khanty-Mansi Autonomous Okrug
- Bobrovsky, Sverdlovsk Oblast, a settlement in Sysertsky District of Sverdlovsk Oblast
- Bobrovskoye, Sverdlovsk Oblast, a selo in Slobodo-Turinsky District of Sverdlovsk Oblast
- Bobrovskoye, Nyuksensky District, Vologda Oblast, a village in Bobrovsky Selsoviet of Nyuksensky District of Vologda Oblast
- Bobrovskoye, Ust-Kubinsky District, Vologda Oblast, a village in Zadneselsky Selsoviet of Ust-Kubinsky District of Vologda Oblast
- Bobrovskoye, Vologodsky District, Vologda Oblast, a village in Bereznikovsky Selsoviet of Vologodsky District of Vologda Oblast
- Bobrovskaya, Konoshsky District, Arkhangelsk Oblast, a village in Klimovsky Selsoviet of Konoshsky District of Arkhangelsk Oblast
- Bobrovskaya, Krasnoborsky District, Arkhangelsk Oblast, a village in Belosludsky Selsoviet of Krasnoborsky District of Arkhangelsk Oblast
- Bobrovsky District in Voronezh Oblast, Russia

== See also ==
- Bobrowski
