= Nikolay Muralov =

Russian revolutionary and military commander, Soviet politician (1877–1937)

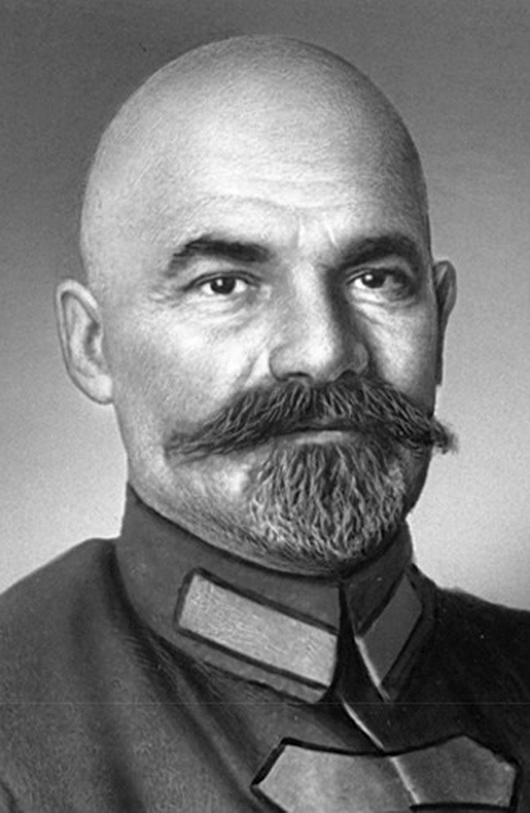
Nikolay Muralov

Nikolay Ivanovich Muralov (Russian: Никола́й Ива́нович Мура́лов; 7 December 1877 – 1 February 1937) was a Bolshevik revolutionary leader and military commander in Russia, who after 1923 became a member of the Left Opposition.

Muralov was a direct participant in both the Revolution of 1905 and the October Revolution of 1917. A personal friend of Leon Trotsky, Muralov was arrested in 1936 during the Great Terror and was a defendant in the so-called "Trial of the Seventeen" in January 1937, after which he was executed.

The official Soviet reckoning of Muralov was softened during the 1960s and he was afforded a full posthumous rehabilitation in 1986.

== Biography ==
=== Early years ===
Nikolay Ivanovich Muralov was born in 1877 in the farm (khutor) Grecheskie Roty near Taganrog, a port city on the Sea of Azov. His father had attended a classical gymnasium for six years and had been a volunteer in the Russian Army during the Crimean War, in the process earning Russia's highest military decoration, the Order of St. George, fourth class, for bravery. An educated and cultured man, his father had made the acquaintance of Alexander Herzen and was a political admirer and subscriber to Herzen's thick journal, Kolokol. His younger brother Alexander, was also involved in the revolutionary movement.

Nikolay worked on the farm throughout his youth and was taught to read and write by his father from an early age. At the age of 17, Muralov went away to an agricultural school, graduating three years later. He then worked as an estate manager in the village of Znamenka, Tambov district, and Nazarov, Moscow district.

During the late 1890s Muralov was a volunteer in the Tsarist army, serving briefly in the Grenadier Regiment in Moscow before being dismissed for reserve duty at Taganrog.

In the fall of 1899, Muralov went to the town of Maikop in the Caucasus Mountains and worked as a manager of a distillery and a creamery. It was there that he was first exposed to Marxist political literature, including the official newspaper of the Russian Social Democratic Labor Party, Iskra, which he read as part of an underground political circle.

=== Political career ===
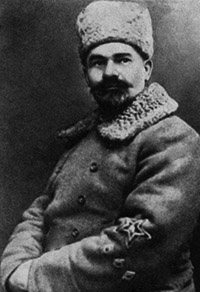
Muralov earlier in his life

Early in 1902, Muralov traveled to Moscow, where he was arrested by the Tsarist political police for the first time. He was held for three months before being released. Muralov joined another underground Marxist circle at Serpukhov, Moscow Oblast, later that same year and became involved in the zemstvo movement. He took a job as an assistant agronomist in the nearby town of Podolsk in 1903, joining the Bolshevik Party at this time.

In the fall of 1905, Muralov made his way to Moscow, where he took an active part in the 1905 Revolution. He remained in the city until the rebellion's suppression by the military in January 1906, participating further in the revolutionary movement in the Don region and at Taganrog, where he came to be regarded as a party specialist in agricultural affairs. He was arrested at Taganrog for a second time later that same year and was imprisoned at Nikolaev for a protracted period.

After his release, Muralov returned briefly to Moscow before taking a job in the Tula district as an estate manager in 1907. There he helped open a tearoom, disguised as a unit of the Temperance Society, but in reality a cover for the underground political movement.

Muralov was drafted into the military during World War I, serving in infantry and transport regiments until the outbreak of the February Revolution in 1917. After that time he became active as an organizer of the Bolshevik faction in the military, helping to establish the soldiers' section of the Moscow Soviet.

During the October Revolution he was a member of the Moscow Revolutionary Military Council (RVS) and part of the revolutionary headquarters staff. He led a detachment to capture the Moscow radio station and to open the prisons, freeing political prisoners.

Muralov signed the order of the Moscow Military Revolutionary Committee and on the same day was appointed chief Commissar of the Moscow Military District.

He was a member of the RVS of the 3rd Army during the Russian Civil War. At the end of the civil war Muralov was named a member of the governing Collegium of the People's Commissariat of Agriculture. He also continued to serve as a district commander of the Red Army in the Moscow Military District and the North Caucus Military District.

=== In opposition ===
From 1925 he was a member of the Central Control Commission of the Russian Communist Party (b) and from 1925 to 1927 he was head of the naval inspection of the Workers' and Peasants' inspection of the USSR and rector of Russian State Agrarian University.

Muralov was one of a handful of close personal friends of Leon Trotsky during his Russian interlude. He became a signatory to the dissident Declaration of the 46 in October 1923, which ushered in a period of oppositionist political activity.

Muralov spoke in defense of the Left Opposition at the 15th Congress of the VKP(b) in December 1927, during which he was heckled mercilessly. Following the congress he was expelled from the VKP(b) and assigned to rural work in Siberia.

Muralov was one of four signatories of a letter to the 16th Congress of the VKP(b) in 1930, a document which demanded free expression for all political oppositions. He continued to work in Siberian agriculture, but refused to denounce either his friend Trotsky or his political past, gaining repute as the last of the leading Bolsheviks to have rejected such measures.

=== Arrest and trial ===
Muralov was arrested by the Soviet secret police (NKVD) on April 17, 1936. He was named as one of eight unindicted co-conspirators in the so-called Kemerovo Trial of October 1936, a highly publicized trial which asserted that Trotskyist saboteurs had caused an explosion at the Kemerovo Central Mine — a blast in which 12 miners had died and 14 others suffered serious injury.

The Kemerovo mine explosion and trial, which had resulted in death sentences for all nine defendants, was made the basis for the second of three great public show trials of the Great Purge — the so-called "Trial of the Anti-Soviet Trotskyist Center." This trial, held over an eight-day period in January 1937, is best remembered for its lead defendants Iurii Piatakov and Karl Radek. Muralov was another of the leading defendants in this public spectacle.

Muralov's abasement was complete during the proceeding. During his direct testimony answering the questions of prosecutor Andrey Vyshinsky, Muralov indicated that he had declined to provide the confession demanded by the secret police until December 5, 1936 — eight months after his arrest. After this date, he signed on to an elaborate confession. He dutifully testified:

"The beginning of my downfall must be dated from the moment I signed the first document against the Party. That was the declaration of the 46 of 1923. With this my downfall began. Later I was drawn into the Trotskyite organization and so on right up to my expulsion from the Party and exile to West Siberia."

Muralov asserted:"For more than ten years I was a faithful soldier of Trotsky, the evil-doer of the working class, the fascist agent worthy of all our contempt, that enemy of the working class and the Soviet Union." He confessed to have established a Siberian Trotskyist center in Novosibirsk and to have received in 1932 a letter from Trotsky's son, Leon Sedov, letters containing Trotsky's instruction written in invisible ink which "proposed to hasten the terrorist acts against Stalin, Voroshilov, Kaganovich, and Kirov." Muralov claimed that he had coordinated the organization of small terrorist cells with several other defendants in the current trial, including Piatakov and Radek, and to have played a part in directly organizing an assassination attempt against Stalin's right-hand man, V.M.Molotov in which a car in which he was traveling was to intentionally be driven and rolled at high speed into a ravine.

In accord with the severity of the crimes to which he confessed, Muralov was sentenced to death.

Following his death sentence, Muralov drafted an appeal for commutation of his sentence to the Central Executive Committee of the Communist Party. He wrote:

"I am sixty years old. I want to devote the remainder of my life fully to the good of constructing our great Motherland. I take the liberty of beseeching the Central Executive Committee of the USSR to spare my life."

The appeal was to be unsuccessful.

=== Death and legacy ===
Nikolay Ivanovich Muralov was executed on February 1, 1937.

An official softening of the historical assessment of Muralov began even under the regime of Leonid Brezhnev. In 1966 the newspaper Sovetskaia Rossiia lauded the Old Bolshevik Muralov as "a courageous and stalwart Leninist, and illustrious statesman, and a solid Bolshevik."

Muralov was formally accorded posthumous rehabilitation in April 1986.
