= Ivan Ksenofontov =

Bolshevik revolutionary

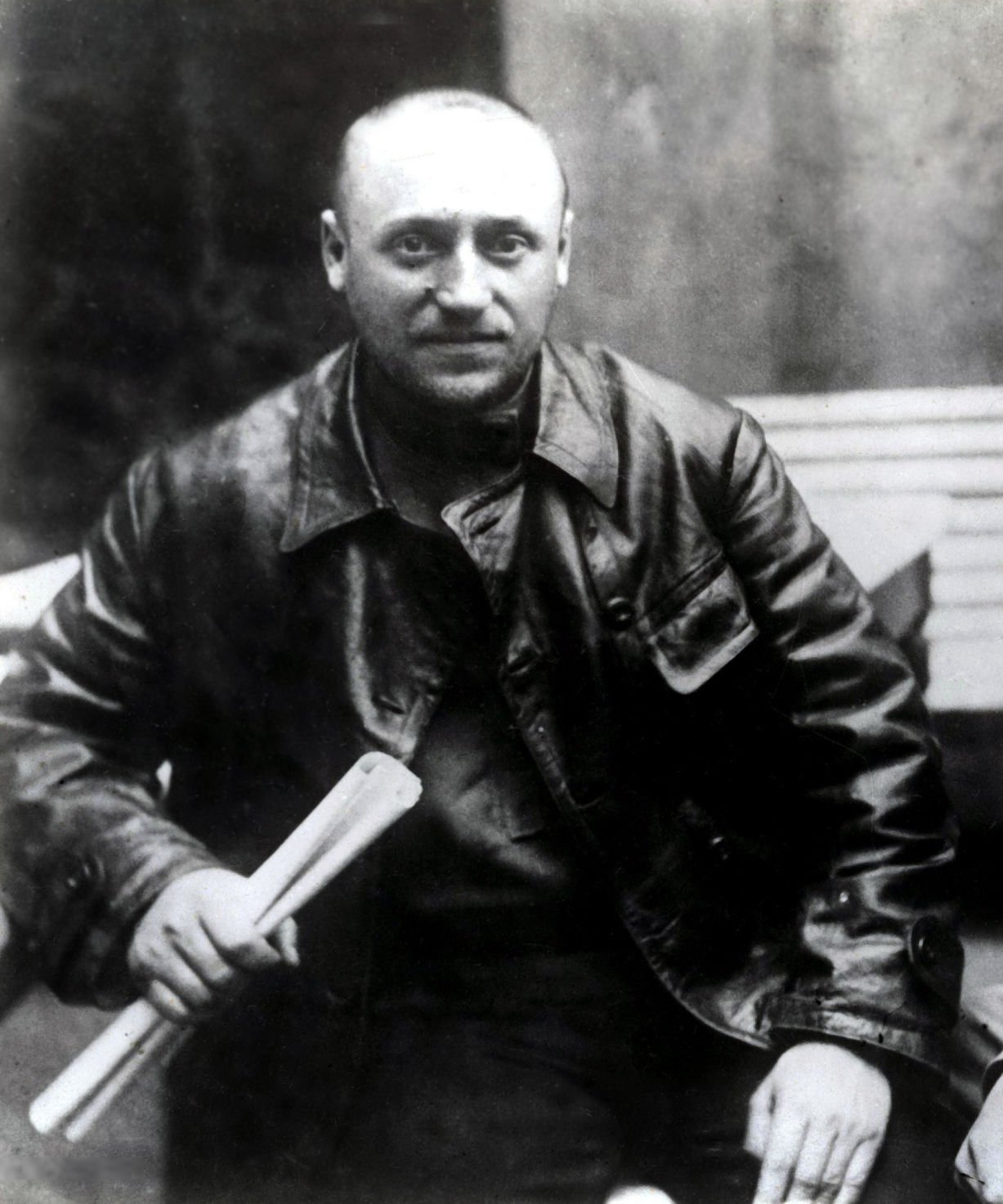
- Ksenofontov in 1919

Deputy Chief of the Cheka
- In office 27 March 1919 – 12 April 1921
- Prime Minister: Vladimir Lenin
- Preceded by: Jēkabs Peterss
- Succeeded by: Józef Unszlicht

Member of the All-Russian Central Executive Committee
- In office 1917–1920

Member of the Russian Constituent Assembly
- In office 28 November 1917 – 5 January 1918

Personal details
- Born: 29 August 1884 Savinki village, Gzhatsky Uyezd, Smolensk Governorate, Russian Empire
- Died: 23 March 1926 (aged 41) Moscow Oblast, Soviet Union
- Citizenship: Russian Empire; Russian Soviet Federative Socialist Republic; Soviet Union
- Party: Communist Party of the Soviet Union (1917-1937)
- Other political affiliations: Russian Social Democratic Labour Party (1903-1917)
- Spouse: Irina Ksenofontova
- Children: Nikolai and Boris
- Profession: Statesman and revolutionary

Military service
- Allegiance: Russian Empire (1906–1908) (1914–1917); Russian Soviet Federative Socialist Republic (1918–1922); Soviet Union (1922–1925)
- Branch/service: Imperial Russian Army; Cheka; GPU; OGPU
- Battles/wars: World War I Russian Civil War

Ivan Ksenofontovich Ksenofontov (Russian: Иван Ксенофонтович Ксенофонтов; August 29, 1884 – March 23, 1926) was a Bolshevik revolutionary and one of the founders of the Soviet secret police and state security agency, the Cheka (later GPU and OGPU).

He gained notoriety as Chairman of the Supreme Revolutionary Tribunal and later as First Deputy Chairman of the Cheka, the agency's "number two" under Felix Dzerzhinsky, where he played a decisive role in crushing various anti-Bolshevik factions and the Kronstadt uprising. An early supporter of Joseph Stalin, he was described as Stalin's "mole" in the security services.

== Biography ==
Born Ivan Kraikov in Moscow, he came from a family of ethnic Pontic Greeks. Not much is known about his childhood and education.

One of the earliest members of the Bolsheviks, he joined them in 1903 upon their formation. From 1906 to 1909 he served in the 15 Rifle Regiment of the Imperial Russian Army, stationed in Latvia. After that, he did "party work", which included armed robberies, for which he was arrested. Released in 1914 upon the outbreak of World War I to serve again in the Army, he bravely fought in the frontlines and was one of the organizers of the Bolshevik committee of the Second Army of the Western Front.

In 1917 he took part in the October Revolution and the seizure of political power by the Bolsheviks. In the election to the Constituent Assembly, he was elected as a Bolshevik for Western Front electoral district. After the October Revolution he was one of the creators of the Cheka, and its vice-chairman, while at the same time chairman of the Special Tribunal of the Cheka and of the Supreme Tribunal of the All-Russian Central Executive Committee.

Ksenofontov took part in the liquidation of the Kronstadt anti-Soviet mutiny of 1921. Between 1921 and 1925 he was chargé d'affaires of the Central Committee of the Party and head of the OGPU Operations Department, at the time heavily engaged against nationalist movements in the Caucasus and Muslim Basmachi guerrillas in Soviet Central Asia. At the same time, he was alleged to have set up the Party Control Office, to provide information to Stalin about the situation in the Party and the security agencies. Ksenofontov was often accused of torture, including hitting and raping women, although in other sources he was described as being polite and art-loving.

He was a delegate to the Tenth, Twelfth, and Thirteenth Party Congresses. He was also elected a member of the All-Russian Central Executive Committee.

Suffering from stomach cancer which caused him excruciating pain, he died in 1926, aged 42.
