= Ivan Sturua =

Georgian revolutionary and Soviet politician (1870–1931)

- ივანე სტურუა

Chairman of the Central Executive Committee of the Georgian SSR
- In office November 1922 – January 1923
- Preceded by: Filipp Makharadze
- Succeeded by: Mikhail Tskhakaya

Personal details
- Born: November 28, 1870 Kulashi, Kutaisi Governorate, Caucasus Viceroyalty
- Died: April 13, 1931 (aged 60) Tbilisi, Georgian SSR, Soviet Union
- Party: RSDLP (Bolsheviks) (1898–1918); All-Union Communist Party (b) (1918–1931)
- Other political affiliations: Communist Party of Georgia
- Relations: Georgy Sturua (brother)

Ivan (Vano) Fyodorovich Sturua (Georgian: ვანო თედორეს ძე სტურუა, romanized: Vano Tedores Dze St'urua, Russian: Иван Фёдорович Стуруа; 28 December 1870 – 13 April 1931) was a Georgian revolutionary and Soviet politician.

== Biography ==
Sturua was born in to peasant family and worked as a railroad worker. From 1896 he became the Marxist social democratic movement. He joined of the Russian Social Democratic Labor Party in 1898 shortly after its founding.

He was one of the founders of the Tiflis Social Democratic Organization and the Tiflis Committee of the RSDLP. One of the leaders of strikes and rallies of Tiflis workers.

In 1900 he moved to Baku, became a member of the Baku Committee of the RSDLP. He worked in the illegal printing houses of the Central Committee of the RSDLP in Baku, Saint Petersburg, and Vyborg. He met with Lenin on the affairs of the illegal printing house and publishing house of the Proletary newspaper. He was arrested several times and was in exile.

After the October Revolution in 1917, he was the chairman of the Kulash volost council of the Kutaisi province and the head of the organization of the RSDLP (B) in Samtredia. From 1918 to 1919 he was a member of the Kutaisi Committee of the Russian Communist Party (Bolsheviks) and a member of the Committee of the RCP (B) of the Western Caucasus. In 1919 and 1921 he was arrested by the government of independent Georgia.

After the establishment of Soviet power in Georgia, from May 1920 to 1921, he was a member of the Presidium of the Central Committee of the Communist Party of Georgia. From 1922 to 1924 he was the People's Commissar of Agriculture of the Georgian SSR.

From October 1921 to January 1923 he was chairman of the All-Georgian Central Executive Committee.

From March 1923 to 13 April 1931, he was Secretary of the Party Board of the Transcaucasian Regional Control Commission of the RCP (b).

Sturua died on 13 April 1931 in Tbilisi.
