= Nikodim Schlegel =

Nikodim Valerianovich Schlegel (Russian: Никодим Валерианович Шлегель; 1877–?) was a Russian politician. He was born in 1877 in Novogrudok. He was a railway worker.

As of 1917 he was a member of the Minsk Committee of the Russian Social Democratic Labour Party (Bolsheviks). In 1917 he was elected to the All-Russian Constituent Assembly from the Minsk constituency.

He later worked at the Minsk Tobacco Factory.

He was arrested in November 1944, accused of collaboration with the German occupation forces. On February 16, 1945, he was sentenced to 8 years of forced labour. He was rehabilitated in 1993.
