= Vladimir Bobrovsky =

Russian revolutionary Marxist

Vladimir Semyonovich Bobrovsky (Russian: Владимир Семёнович Бобровский; 15 October 1873 – 30 March 1924) was a Russian revolutionary Marxist active in the Russian Social Democratic Labour Party and the Russian Bolshevik Party.

Bobrovsky's underground party names included the aliases "Yefrem" ("Ефрем"), "Margarita" ("Маргарита"), "Fyodor" ("Фёдор"), and "Petrov" ("Петров").

== Early life ==
Vladimir Semyonovich Bobrovsky was born on 15 October 1873 in the city of Belgorod in Imperial Russia's Kursk Governorate (now in the southwestern Belgorod Oblast of the Russian Federation). He attended a Nizhny Novgorod Realschule, subsequently graduating from a veterinary institute in Kharkov in 1898.

== Underground efforts ==
Bobrovsky became active in the Russian socialist movement during his student years in Kharkov and, in autumn 1898, established connections with a Moscow Social Democratic group affiliated with future Mensheviks Cherevanin and Avilov through an engineer named Shomet. Arrested on 20 January 1900 in connection with this group, Bobrovsky remained imprisoned until March.

Remaining under the watch of the police in Kharkov after his release, Bobrovsky was rearrested in November 1900. Jailed again, he remained in custody until February 1901, following which he joined the Russian Social Democratic Labour Party (RSDLP) committee in Kiev. Arriving in Moscow to avoid the Kiev authorities, he was rearrested in February and sent back to Kiev to be tried alongside other socialists associated with the political newspaper Iskra and the party's Kiev group, but after months of imprisonment succeeded in fleeing abroad through an escape carried out by eleven activists. He affiliated with the RSDLP's Bolshevik faction after the intra-party split in 1903, staying in contact with the Bolsheviks during his period abroad in Geneva, Switzerland after the Kiev prison-break.

Bobrovsky returned to Russia in order to carry out work for the Bolsheviks in Tiflis (Tbilisi) in 1904 under the assumed identity of one "Nikolay Ivanovich Golovanov", where he worked alongside Joseph Stalin, Mikhail Tskhakaya, and others as a members of the RSDLP organization in the Caucasus. In the Caucasus, as elsewhere, the Bolsheviks made use of a system of ciphers to maintain the secrecy of intraparty communications: the 34-letter phrase "Южно-американские штаты" ("South-American states") was Bobrovsky's individual cryptographic algorithm.

In autumn of 1904 Bobrovsky left Tiflis in order to carry out party work in Baku and took part in the organization of strikers during the winter. Again facing arrest on charges of spreading communist propaganda, Bobrovsky gave the police a fake name, and released from prison in September 1905. Subjected to the additional penalty of five years of exile (he was sent to the northern city of Arkhangelsk rather than Siberia as a result of the exceptional circumstances of the Russo-Japanese War of 1904–1905), Bobrovsky was freed by a group of protesting workers in Rostov during the journey and immediately went to join the Bolsheviks in Moscow.

After another arrest followed by internal exile, Bobrovsky arrived in Kostroma and came to lead the local Bolshevik propaganda efforts and organizing of peasant committees. In 1907 he took part in the organization of the printing presses for the distribution of illegal Marxist literature in Ivanovo-Voznesensk. His health, already weakened by the many periods of imprisonment, began to decline noticeably after he and other suppressed May Day demonstrators were attacked and subjected to flogging with whips.

Again arrested by the authorities in Moscow, Bobrovsky faced another sentence of political repression through imprisonment, internal exile, and police monitoring, but was subsequently permitted to take up residence in Moscow following this period. Bobrovsky remained connected with the Bolsheviks and took part in the organizing of a legal newspaper, Rabochiy Trud, in 1914.

== War and revolution ==
Like Vladimir Lenin and others in the Bolshevik current, Bobrovsky assumed an internationalist position towards the hostilities between the European imperialist powers during World War I, arguing that no Marxist movement could credibly lend support to a devastating intra-capitalist conflict, but was nonetheless drafted into the Imperial Russian Army as a veterinary doctor on the home front.

Bobrovsky exploited the situation by using his proximity to the conscripted Russian soldiers to advance Marxist propaganda and the Bolshevik cause among the soldiers in Serpukhov in 1915–1917; following the February Revolution of 1917 he was elected a representative of the troops from a soldiers’ soviet (council), whose newspaper Bobrovsky also edited after helping organize its production in May 1917.

As the Russian participation in the First World War lingered following the advancement of Alexander Kerensky to head of the Provisional Government after the overthrow of Czar Nicholas II, Bobrovsky was directed to assume work in Moscow as a military veterinarian. Following the dispersal of the Kerensky government through the October Revolution of 1917 Bobrovsky participated in a workers’ control soviet, carried out administrative work as a supervisor of the city's slaughterhouses, and worked in the veterinary subcommittee of the Moscow city soviet, the sanatorium division of Moscow's Health Department, and in the Central Veterinary Directorate of the People's Commissariat for Agriculture prior to assuming an executive role in the State Institute for Journalism in early 1924.

Bobrovsky died in Moscow on 30 March 1924.
