= Mikhail Tskhakaya =

Georgian revolutionary and Soviet politician (1865–1950)

- მიხა ცხაკაია
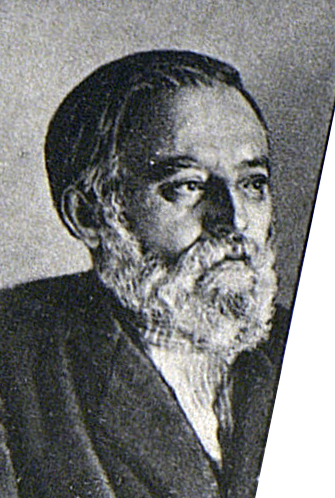

Chairman of the Central Executive Committee of the Georgian SSR
- In office January 1923 – 15 February 1931
- Preceded by: Ivan Sturua
- Succeeded by: Filipp Makharadze

Personal details
- Born: May 4, 1865 Kutais Governorate, Martvili Municipality, Russian Empire
- Died: March 19, 1950 (aged 84) Moscow, Russian Soviet Federative Socialist Republic, Soviet Union
- Resting place: Mtatsminda Pantheon
- Party: RSDLP (1898–1903); RSDLP (Bolsheviks) (1903–1918); All-Union Communist Party (b) (1918–1950)
- Other political affiliations: Communist Party of Georgia
- Awards: Order of Lenin

Mikhail Grigoryevich Tskhakaya (Georgian: მიხეილ გრიგოლის ძე ცხაკაია, Russian: Михаил Григорьевич Цхакая; 4 May 1865 – 19 March 1950), also known as Barsov, was a Georgian revolutionary and Soviet politician. Barsov was a senior leader in the Bolshevik movement in Georgia, having been active in revolutionary politics since 1880. He was one of the five signatories of the Document that formed the Soviet Union.

He was born in 1865 in Martvili Municipality. In 1892, he helped found Mesame Dasi (third group), the first Georgian Socialist party. When the Russian Social Democratic Labour Party was founded, he joined it. He saved the young Joseph Stalin from expulsion for Georgian nationalism in 1904. However, Tskhakaya made Stalin write a credo renouncing his views and attend a series of his lectures on Marxism. Despite this, they remained friends.

In July 1906, Tskhakaya was Stalin's witness at his wedding to Kato Svanidze. On September 9, Tskhakaya and Stalin were among just six Bolsheviks at the Social Democratic conference in Tbilisi (the other 36 were Mensheviks). They shared a room at the 5th Congress of the Russian Social Democratic Labour Party in London. Neither were allowed to vote owing to Bolshevism's weakness in Georgia. In 1907, after a series of arrests and deportations, he went into exile in Switzerland, where he visited Lenin in Geneva.

He returned to Russia in 1917, alongside Lenin on the famous sealed train. From that point onwards, he was an influential leader of the Communist Party of Georgia. In June 1919 he was arrested in Kutaisi by the Menshevik government and released in May 1920. He became a member of the Central Committee of the Communist Party (Bolsheviks) of Georgia. He was the representative of the Georgian SSR under the government of the RSFSR.

From 1923 to 1930 Tskhakaya served as Chairman of the Presidium of the Central Executive Committee of the Georgian SSR and one of the chairmen of the Central Executive Committee of the Transcaucasian Socialist Federative Soviet Republic while also being member of the Presidium of the Central Executive Committee of the Soviet Union.

From 1920 he was member of the Executive Committee of the Communist International. In 1922 he signed the Treaty on the formation of the Soviet Union, representing the Transcaucasian SSR.

He died in Moscow after a serious illness on March 19, 1950, shortly after his election as a deputy to the Soviet of Nationalities of the Supreme Soviet of the Soviet Union. In the 1980s, he was reburied at the Mtatsminda Pantheon.
