= Maria Iasneva-Golubeva =

Russian revolutionary

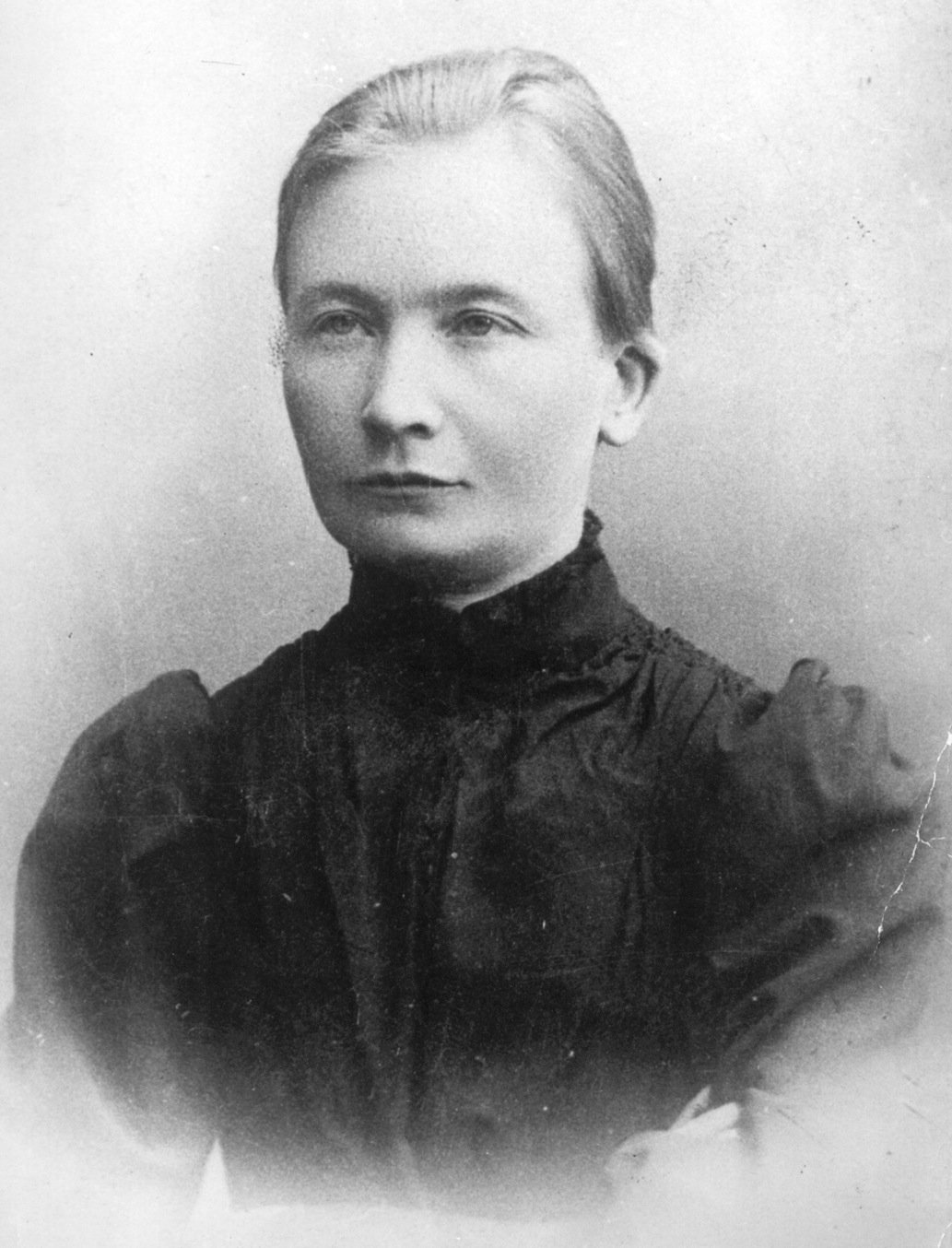
Maria Iasnova-Golubeva in the 1890s

Maria Petrovna Iasneva-Golubeva (Russian: Мария Петровна Яснева-Голубева; 1861 – 10 May 1936) was a Russian revolutionary. She was first a member of the narodniki movement, and joined the social democrats in 1901.

== Biography ==
Maria Iasneva was born into a noble family. She studied teaching at the women's seminary of Kostroma, and then entered the revolutionary circle of the Jacobins, organized by Pyotr Zaichnevsky who was then sent into exile in Kostroma. She then worked in a country school and militated as a narodnik. In 1891, she was exiled under police surveillance to Samara, where she met Vladimir Lenin, under whose influence she became a social democrat (RSDLP).

She then worked in Saratov on the distribution of Iskra. She joined the Bolsheviks after the second congress of the RSDLP, in 1903. She was secretary of the committee of this party in Saratov in 1903 and in 1904, and joined at the end of 1904 Saint Petersburg, where she was a member of the committee for the preparation of the 3rd congress of the RSDLP. The meetings of the committee took place in her apartment, and Lenin hid there at the beginning of 1906. In 1907 she organized the clandestine printing house of the Bolsheviks in Saint Petersburg.

After the October Revolution, she worked at the Central soviet of factory committees, then at the People's Commissariat of Justice, the Central Committee of the Communist Party in Petrograd, and from 1920 to 1928 in the Central Committee apparatus of the party. She retired in 1928 and died on May 10, 1936.

Her husband, Vasily Semenovich Golubev, was a journalist and rural politician.

== Legacy ==
Maria Iasneva-Golubeva is the protagonist of the short story A house on the Monetnaya from Vera Morozova.

A museum is dedicated to her in Samara, in her former flat in the Kirilova House.

== Annexes ==
=== Bibliography ===
- Е. М. Жукова. Голубева-Яснева (in Russian). Moscou: Советская историческая энциклопедия (Soviet Historical Encyclopedia), 1973—1982.

=== External links ===
- Вера Морозова (Vera Morozova). "Дом на Монетной". profilib.com (in Russian).
- Сергей Иванович Дивильковский (Sergueï Ivanovitch Divilkovski). "Славная моя большевичка". divilkovskiy (in Russian).
