= Rosalia Zemlyachka =

Russian revolutionary (1876–1947)

- Розалия Землячка
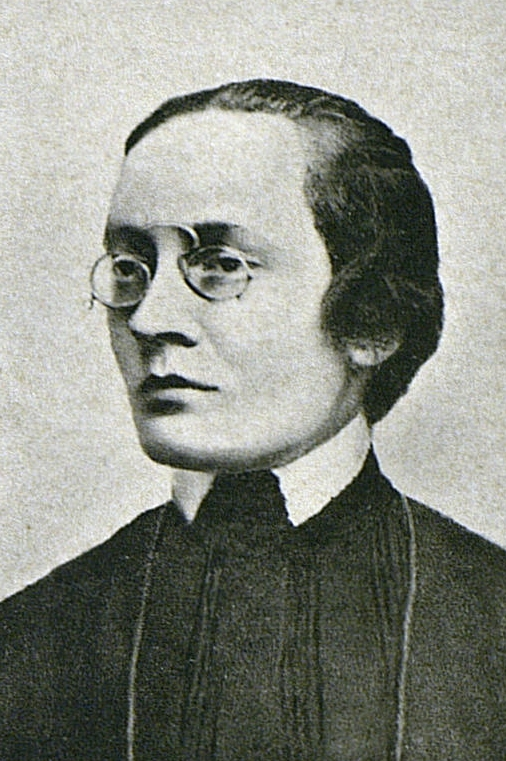
- Zemlyachka c. 1900s

Deputy Premier of the Soviet Union
- In office 8 May 1939 – 26 August 1943
- Premier: Joseph Stalin
- Succeeded by: Georgy Malenkov

Representative of the People's Control under the Government
- In office 8 May 1939 – 6 September 1940
- Preceded by: Zakhar Belenky
- Succeeded by: Lev Mekhlis (as Minister)

Personal details
- Born: Rosalia Samoilovna Zalkind; 20 March 1876 Kiev, Russian Empire
- Died: 21 January 1947 (aged 70) Moscow, Russian SFSR, Soviet Union
- Resting place: Kremlin Wall Necropolis, Moscow
- Education: University of Lyon
- Occupation: Politician
- Known for: Marxist revolutionary

Rosalia Samoilovna Zemlyachka (Russian: Розалия Самойловна Землячка; née Zalkind; 1 April [O.S. 20 March] 1876 – 21 January 1947) was a Russian revolutionary and Soviet politician. As a revolutionary, she was best known by the alias Zemlyachka, though she also used the party pseudonyms 'Demon' and 'Osipov'. Her married name was Samoilova.

== Biography ==
Rosalia Zalkind was born in Kiev, in Kiev Governorate of the Russian Empire, the daughter of a wealthy Jewish family. Her father, Samuil Markovich Zalkind, was a first guild merchant. She was educated in a girls' gymnasium in Kiev, and later at the Faculty of Medicine of the University of Lyon. From age of 17, she was involved in revolutionary activities. A member of the Russian Social Democratic Labour Party since 1898, Zemlyachka worked in Odessa and Yekaterinoslav as an agent for the Iskra newspaper, founded by Vladimir Lenin and Julius Martov.

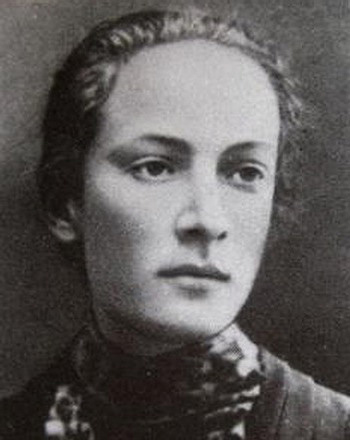
Zemlyachka in her youth, c. 1900

Zemlyachka was a delegate to the Second Congress of the RSDLP, which convened in Brussels in July 1903, but she was arrested by the Belgian police and deported. When the RSDLP split into factions, she joined the Bolsheviks. She continued to support Lenin when he appeared to be losing control of the Bolsheviks, who wanted to bring about a reconciliation of the factions of the RSDLP. In July 1904, she travelled to Geneva for the conference of hard line Bolsheviks who formed the 'Bureau of Majority Committees', the forerunner of the Central Committee of the Communist Party of the Soviet Union, to which she was elected, under the name 'Demon', on Lenin's recommendation. Afterwards she returned to Russia to build the Bolshevik organisation, visiting St Petersburg, Georgia, and Baku.

In December 1905, she was in Moscow at the time of the Moscow uprising. After its failure, she insisted on a purge of the Moscow Bolshevik organisation. She was arrested in 1906, but escaped from a police station. She was arrested several times, and in October 1907 was imprisoned in the Lithuania Castle in St Petersburg. After her release in 1909, she was briefly the secretary of the Bolshevik organisation in Baku, before emigrating. She returned to Russia illegally in 1914, and took charge of illegal transport across the Finnish border. In 1915-16 she was the secretary of the Moscow party organisation.

After the February Revolution, Zemlyachka was appointed the secretary of the Moscow party committee. During the Bolshevik Revolution, she directed the armed uprising in the Rogozhsk-Simonovsky district of Moscow. In 1918, she supported the 'Left Communists', who opposed the signing of the Treaty of Brest-Litovsk. During the Russian Civil War, when she served as a military commissar on the southern front, she supported the 'military opposition', who objected to the deployment of former officers of the Imperial Russian Army.

== Massacre of the 'Wrangelites' ==
Zemlyachka was appointed secretary of the Crimean party committee in November 1920, when the last White Army left in the war, commanded by Baron Wrangel, was evacuating the peninsula. Leaflets were dropped by aeroplane over Sevastopol, the last city held by the Whites, which offered an amnesty to those who surrendered to the Red Army. They were signed in the name of the former commander-in-chief of the Imperial Army, General Aleksei Brusilov, who was persuaded to go to Crimea to supervise their surrender by the Deputy People's Commissar for War, Ephraim Sklyansky.

Before Brusilov set out, a local decision was made to massacre those who had surrendered. The order to carry out this massacre was signed by the Chairman of the Crimean revolutionary committee, Béla Kun, Zemlyachka, and the head of the Crimean Cheka, Semyon Dukelsky. According to English writer Donald Rayfield, Kun and Zemlyachka were lovers, and she was "a Cheka sadist who tied the officers in pairs to planks and burned them alive in furnaces or drowned them in barges that she sank offshore. Estimates vary of the number killed, which may have been 70,000. Social scientist, Nikolay Zayats, from the National Academy of Sciences of Belarus has disputed the large, "fantastic" estimates and attributed this to eyewitness accounts and émigré press of the White Army. A Crimean Cheka report in 1921 showed that 441 people were shot, with a modern estimate that 5,000–12,000 people in total were executed in Crimea.

== Later career ==
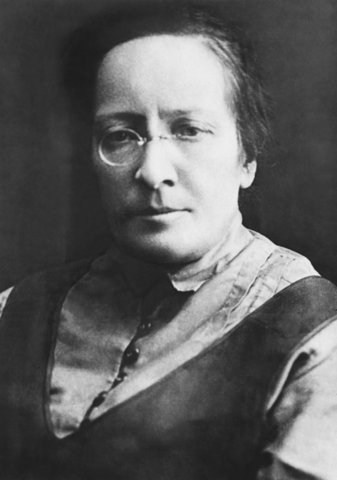
Rosalia Zemlyachka in the 1930s

Between 1921 and 1924, Zemlyachka was the secretary of the Zamoskvoretsky district committee, Moscow. In 1924, she was sent to South East Russia. In 1925–26, she was the secretary of the Motovilikhsky district party committee, in Perm. Between 1924 and 1934, she was a member of the Central Control Commission. In 1926, she became a member of the collegium of Rabkrin and the head of its complaints bureau.

According to a tribute written to mark the 110th anniversary of her birth, she involved hundreds of workers and party members in her campaigns against bureaucracy. She became so well known as "the scourge of bureaucrats and red-tape mongers" that a letter reached her from the provinces with the address 'Moscow, Comrade Zemlyachka'. In February 1934, she was appointed the head of the Transport Commission of the Soviet Control Commission, the successor organisation to Rabkrin.

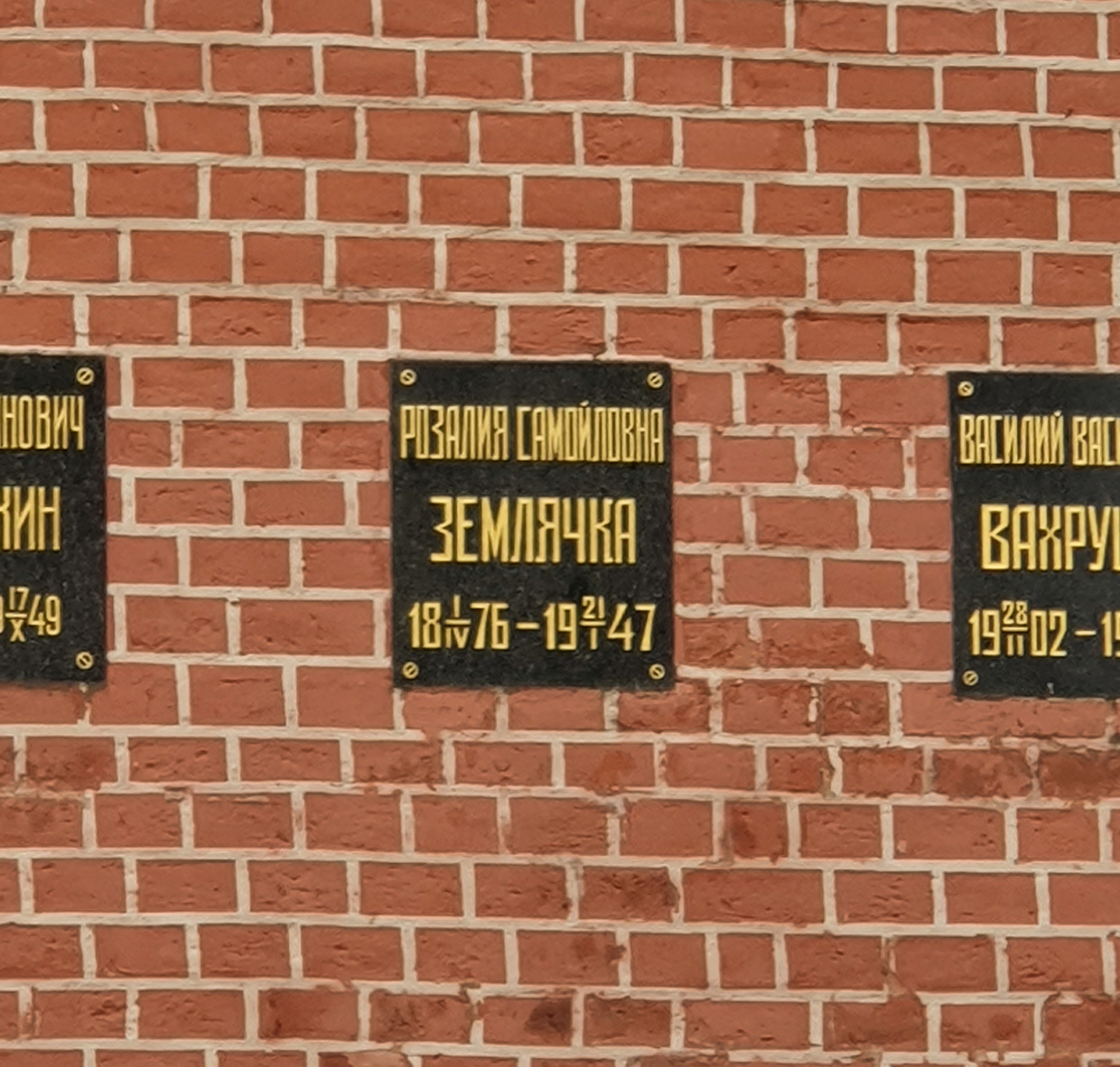
Zemlyachka's grave at the Kremlin Wall Necropolis

Zemlyachka received a major promotion in May 1939, when she was appointed Chairman of the Soviet Control Commission and a Deputy Chairman of the Council of People's Commissars of the Soviet Union. She is the only woman to have served at this level in the Stalinist period, and the first woman to be decorated with the Order of the Red Banner.

During World War II, Zemlyachka was in charge of the relocation of Moscow University from Ashgabat to Sverdlovsk (1942) and the re-evacuation from Sverdlovsk back to Moscow (1943).

Zemlyachka died on 21 January 1947 in Moscow. Her ashes were buried at the Kremlin Wall Necropolis.

== See also ==
- Outline of the Russian Revolution and Civil War
- Bibliography of the Russian Revolution and Civil War
- Bibliography of Stalinism and the Soviet Union
- Index of Old Bolsheviks
- Index of articles related to the Russian Revolution and Civil War

== Sources ==
- Barbara Evans Clements, Bolshevik Women. Cambridge University Press, 1997, ISBN 9780521599207
