= Semyon Dukelsky =

Soviet official (1892–1960)

- Семён Дукельский
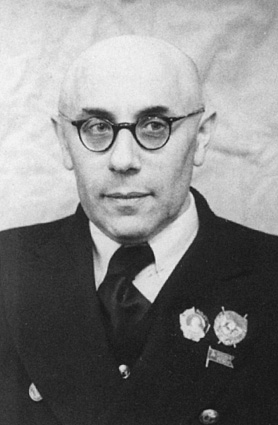

Chairman of the State Committee for Cinematography
- In office 23 March 1938 – 4 June 1939
- Preceded by: Boris Shumyatsky
- Succeeded by: Ivan Bolshakov

Personal details
- Born: 1 August 1892 Yelizavetgrad, Russian Empire (now Kropyvnytskyi, Ukraine)
- Died: 30 October 1960 (aged 68) Moscow, Russian SFSR, Soviet Union
- Party: All-Union Communist Party (Bolshevik)

Semyon Semyonovich Dukelsky (Russian: Семён Семёнович Дукельский; 1 August 1892 – 30 October 1960) was a Soviet official who ran the Soviet State Committee for Cinematography briefly during the late 1930s.

== Early career ==
Semyon Dukelsky was born in Yelizavetgrad, in the southern Kherson Governorate of the Russian Empire (now Kropyvnytskyi, Ukraine) as the son of a minor official. In 1906, he graduated from the 3rd grade of the 4th grade Jewish state school in Yelizavetgrad. He worked as a pianist in cinemas in various cities, before being drafted into the Imperial Russian Army in 1915. He joined the Bolsheviks in 1917, after the February Revolution. In 1918, he worked in the administration of the newly created Red Army, under Leon Trotsky, until Trotsky's deputy, Ephraim Sklyansky, complained "I don't need such an assistant". He was transferred to the Cheka in southern Ukraine.

As head of the Cheka in Crimea in 1920, Dukelsky was party to one of the most infamous atrocities of the Russian Civil War, when thousands of officers who had been persuaded to surrender under an amnesty after the final battle were massacred. The order to kill them was signed by Bela Kun, Rosalia Zemlyachka, and Dukelsky. Estimates vary of the number killed, which may have been 70,000. Social scientist, Nikolay Zayats, from the National Academy of Sciences of Belarus has disputed the large, "fantastic" estimates and attributed this to eyewitness accounts and White army emigre press. A Crimean Cheka report in 1921 showed that 441 people were shot with a modern estimation that 5,000-12,000 people in total were executed in Crimea.

In 1921, Dukelsky was appointed head of the Cheka in Odessa. In 1926–1930, he was the head of the food industry in Odessa. In June 1930, he was posted to Voronezh as the deputy head of the OGPU for the Central Black Earth Region. He held the equivalent post in the Belorussian Soviet Socialist Republic in 1930–1931. In 1932–1937, he was the head of the OGPU in the Central Black Earth Region. From July 1934, he was the head of the Voronezh region NKVD.

== Meeting with Osip Mandelstam ==
As the regional chief of police in Voronezh, Dukelsky was responsible for supervising the poet, Osip Mandelstam, who was exiled there in 1934–1937. There is a story that when Mandelstam was desperate for someone to hear his poems, he would ring Dukelsky and recite them to him. This is unlikely, but Mandelstam's widow, Nadezhda, described a meeting between her husband and someone she calls the Commandant, whom the couple visited to complain about being harassed by police informers. During the conversation, Mandelstam offered to send Dukelsky a copy of every new poem he wrote "so you don't have to waste your men's time." It surprised Nadezhda that Dukelsky agreed to meet her husband at all. She speculated that perhaps he wanted "to have a look at this odd bird that was sitting in his cage." To her surprise, the meeting ended "amicably" and "the police spies vanished into thin air, and for the rest of our stay in Voronezh we were never troubled by them again."

== Role in the Great Purge ==
In July 1936, Dukelsky complained to Nikolai Yezhov, the party secretary with oversight over the NKVD, that the investigation of alleged Trotskyist conspirators, which had speeded up at the start of 1935 after the assassination of Sergei Kirov, had slowed down. On 11 September, he sent Yezhov another note, alleging that the NKVD had been informed early in 1933 of the existence of a secret Trotskyist centre but had not acted on the information. Yezhov passed note onto Stalin. The head of the NKVD, Genrikh Yagoda, reacted by sacking Dukelsky, but that same month, Yagoda was sacked, partly on the strength of Dukelsky's denunciation, and Dukelsky was reinstated.

The purge in Voronezh followed the pattern in other cities, with the regional secretary of the Communist party and the regional chairman of the executive among those who were shot as 'enemies of the people'. In 1989, a mass grave of victims of the purge was discovered in a forests near Somovo village in Voronezh province.

In the summer of 1937, Dukelsky suffered a serious car accident, which meant that he was hospitalised at the time when Yezhov was conducting the purge, during which thousands of NKVD officers were arrested and executed. The accident possibly saved Dukelsky's life.

== Head of the cinema industry ==
Dukelsky was appointed head of the Committee for Cinema Affairs on 23 March 1938, following the arrest of the previous head, Boris Shumyatsky. Soon after his appointment, he issued a decree that led to the dismissals and legal action against employees who had been late for work, absent, or were drunk during working hours. He introduced a system of military discipline to monitor the staff of film studios, cinemas etc. He ordered the cancellation of films not relevant to contemporary themes.

Among others, he banned what would have been a film version of one of the most popular short stories in Russian literature, The Queen of Spades, by Pushkin, directed by Mikhail Romm, with music by Sergei Prokofiev. It was originally scheduled to come out in 1937, to mark the centenary of Pushkin's birth, but was delayed by the arrests that swept through the cinema industry that year. About 70,000 roubles had been spent on the production when Dukalsky called Romm in to tell him that it was to be scrapped. When Romm objected, Dukelsky told him:

"I don't understand you! Why are you always grieving The Queen of Spades - and thinking about three cards, three cards, three cards. If I were in your shoes, I'd be happy. What don't you have? Money? You have it! Fame? You have it! Your films are even shown abroad. You have an apartment! What else do you need?"

According to the historian, Jamie Miller, Dukelsky's "dogmatic demands that films made in 1938 should reflect themes of 'modernity' ... (and) his misguided attempts to defend and foster the dissemination of films favourable to contemporary party-sponsored issues had an extremely negative impact." During 1938, just 38 films were made. However, unlike his predecessor, Dukelsky allowed Sergei Eisenstein to direct a film - Alexander Nevsky, considered by many to be the finest film made in the USSR in the 1930s.

In January 1939, Dukelsky ended the system under which film directors were paid a proportion of ticket sales, decreeing that directors and cameras would be paid according to how the authorities rated the quality of their work.

== Personality ==
Mikhail Romm described Dukelsky as "a strange man, somehow quite extraordinary ... tall, bony, in blue breeches and boots, in a blue tunic, his shoulders are so sharp. The body turns with the head. The mouth, when it smiles, bends. Brit bald. The head is like an egg - large, long. The ears stick out and the glasses are dark. Looks like Pobedonostsev; long neck with an Adam's apple. And the head tosses and turns with the body. The first impression is rather ominous." On further acquaintance, Romm decided that he was "an idiot, a son of a bitch ... a cretin, a dog."

== Later career ==
On 9 April 1939, Dukelsky was appointed USSR People's Commissar for the Merchant Fleet, succeeding his former boss, Yezhov, who was arrested the following day. According to Romm, one of his first acts was to ban sailors from disembarking in any foreign port. He was removed from his post as head of the cinema industry "at his own request" on 4 June 1939. In 1942, several months after the German invasion, he was demoted, and put in charge of ammunition stores in the Chelyabinsk region. In 1943–1948, he was Deputy People's Commissar for Justice for the RSFSR. He retired on a pension in 1948, and settled in Moscow, where he died.
