= Lev Mekhlis =

Soviet politician and military officer

- Лев Мехлис
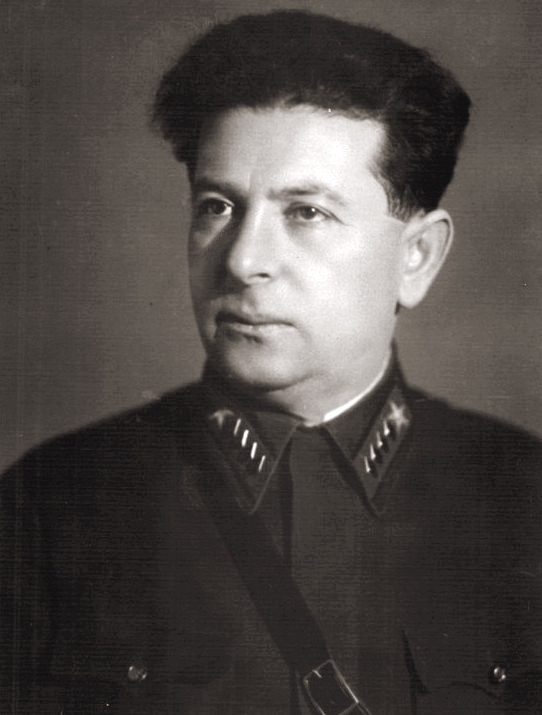
- Mekhlis in 1939

Minister of State Control
- In office 19 March 1946 – 27 October 1950
- Premier: Joseph Stalin
- Preceded by: Vasily Popov
- Succeeded by: Vsevolod Merkulov
- In office 6 September 1940 – 21 June 1941
- Preceded by: Rosalia Zemlyachka
- Succeeded by: Vasily Popov

Deputy Chairman of the Council of People's Commissars
- In office 6 September 1940 – 15 May 1944
- Premier: Vyacheslav Molotov; Joseph Stalin

Editor-in-chief of Pravda
- In office 1930–1937
- Preceded by: Maximilian A. Saveliev
- Succeeded by: Ivan E. Nikitin

Full member of the 17th, 18th Central Committee
- In office 12 October 1937 – 16 October 1952

Candidate member of the 17th Central Committee
- In office 10 February 1934 – 12 October 1937

Full member of the 17th, 18th Orgburo
- In office 14 January 1938 – 16 October 1952

Personal details
- Born: Lev Zakharovich Mekhlis; 13 January 1889 Odessa, Russian Empire
- Died: 13 February 1953 (aged 64) Moscow, Russian SFSR, Soviet Union
- Resting place: Kremlin Wall Necropolis
- Citizenship: Russian Empire, Soviet Union
- Party: CPSU (1918–53)
- Education: Institute of Red Professors
- Occupation: Politician; Political commissar Chief editor
- Awards: Order of Lenin (4); Order of the Red Banner (2); Order of Suvorov; Order of Kutuzov; Order of Military Valour (grade 4)
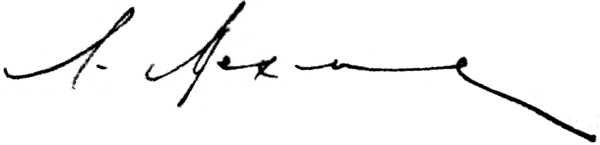
- Signature
- Nickname(s): The Shark; Gloomy Demon

Military service
- Allegiance: Russian Empire (1911–1917); Soviet Russia (1918–1920); Soviet Union (1941–1945)
- Years of service: 1911–1920, 1941–1946
- Rank: Colonel General
- Battles/wars: World War I Russian Civil War; World War II

Lev Zakharovich Mekhlis (Russian: Лев Заха́рович Ме́хлис; 13 January 1889 – 13 February 1953) was a Soviet politician and a prominent officer in the Red Army from 1937 to 1942. As a senior political commissar, he became one of the main Stavka representatives on the Eastern Front (1941–1945) during World War II, being involved successively with five to seven Soviet fronts. Despite his fervent political engagement and loyalty to the Communist Party, various Soviet leaders, including Joseph Stalin, criticized and reprimanded Mekhlis for incompetent military leadership during World War II.

== Early career ==
Mekhlis, born in Odessa, completed six classes of Jewish commercial school. He worked as a schoolteacher from 1904 to 1911. In 1907–1910 he was a member of the Zionist workers' movement Poale Zion.

In 1911 he joined the Imperial Russian Army, where he served in the 2nd Grenadier Artillery Brigade. In 1912 he obtained the rank of bombardier. He served in the artillery in the First World War.

In 1918, he joined the Communist Party and until 1920, he did political work in the Red Army (commissioner of brigade, then 46th division, group of forces). In 1921–1922 he managed administrative inspection in the People's Commissariat of Worker-Peasant Inspection, which was headed by Stalin. In 1922–1926 he served as the assistant to the secretary and the manager of the bureau of the Secretariat of the Central Committee - in effect Stalin's personal secretary.

In 1926–1930 he took courses at the Communist Academy and in the Institute of Red Professors. When Stalin ordered the forced collectivisation of Soviet farms in 1929, Mekhlis helped purge the Institute of Stalin's opponents. He was also the instigator of a letter published in Pravda on 30 May 1930, denouncing the influence of the right wing opposition in the Industrial Academy in Moscow. The resulting purge saw the future Soviet leader Nikita Khrushchev appointed head of the party organisation at the Academy. From 1930 he was the head of the press corps Central Committee, and in 1930, he succeeded Nikolai Bukharin, who had led the opposition to collectivisation, as editor in chief of Pravda. He was elected a candidate member of the Central Committee of the Communist Party of the Soviet Union in 1934, and promoted to full membership in October 1937.

== Military career ==
In December 1937, during the Great Purge, Mekhlis was confirmed as Head of the Political Administration of the Red Army, which had been vacant since the previous holder, Yan Gamarnik, had committed suicide. Nicknamed "the Shark" and the "Gloomy Demon", Mekhlis supervised a drastic purge of at least 20,000 of the 30,000 political commissars attached to the army.

In May 1938, he travelled to Khabarovsk with the Deputy head of the NKVD, Mikhail Frinovsky, to supervise the purge of the Far Eastern Army. Its commander Vasily Blyukher was arrested and beaten to death. In a telegram to Stalin, Mekhlis boasted, "I dismissed all 215 political workers, most of them arrested. But the purge is not finished."

In January 1938, Mekhlis was promoted to the Orgburo. By November 1938, he was officially listed as second in seniority in the military establishment, behind People's Commissar Kliment Voroshilov and ahead of the professional soldiers. According to Khrushchev:

He had a particularly strong influence over Stalin ... I had once been on very good terms with him ... But by the time he took over as chief of the Political Directorate I considered him a nitwit, and I was appalled that someone like him could enjoy Stalin's unbounded confidence. Mekhlis's influence did the army and the country no good."

From 6 September 1940-June 1941, he was People's Commissar of State Control (Goskontrolya).

During the war with Finland in 1939-40, Mekhlis was sent to the front to report back to Stalin on why the Red Army was being beaten back by the Finns. He attributed the setbacks to treachery, and had the Soviet commander Alexei Vinogradov, Vinogradov's chief of staff, and the chief of the political department tried and shot in front of the troops.

In June 1941, Mekhlis was reassigned to his former position as head of the chief of main political administration and the deputy of the Peoples Commissar of Defense. He was with Stalin on the day the Germans invaded the USSR, at the start of Operation Barbarossa and decided to "freeze" the Germans outside of Moscow. Mekhlis was named army commissar of the 1st rank, which corresponded to the title of General of the Red Army. In 1942 he was the representative of the Stavka, the Red Army's high command. Needing to find someone to blame for the disastrous setbacks the Red Army suffered during 1941, Mekhlis ordered an artillery commander on the North Western front, Vasily Sofronovich Goncharov, to be shot in front headquarters, on 11 September 1941. Goncharov was posthumously exonerated in 2002.

Mekhlis personally encouraged the killing of German prisoners of war, contributing to the massacre of Feodosia.

In March 1942, Mekhlis was sent to organise the defence of the vital Kerch peninsula on the Crimean Front, where he fell into disputes with General Dmitry Timofeyevich Kozlov. In May 1942, the Red Army was driven out of the Crimea by a smaller German force. In his report to Stalin, Mekhlis sought to blame Kozlov, but received a scathing telegram in reply:

Crimean front, t. Mekhlis:

Your code message #254 (I) received. Your position of a detached observer who is not accountable for the events at the Crimean Front is puzzling. Your position may sound convenient, but it positively stinks. At the Crimean Front, you are not an outside observer, but the responsible representative of Stavka, who is accountable for every success and failure that takes place at the Front, and who is required to correct, right there and then, any mistake made by the commanding officers.

You, along with the commanding officers, will answer for failing to reinforce the left flank of the Front. If, as you say, "everything seemed to indicate that the opponent would begin an advance first thing in the morning", and you still hadn't done everything needed to repel their attack instead limiting your involvement merely to passive criticism, then you are squarely to blame. It seems that you still have not figured out that we sent you to the Crimean Front not as a government auditor but as a responsible representative of Stavka.

You demand that Kozlov be replaced, that even Hindenburg would be an improvement. Yet you know full well that Soviet reserves do not have anyone named Hindenburg. The situation in Crimea is not difficult to grasp, and you should be able to take care of it on your own. Had you committed your front line aviation and used it against the opponent's tanks and infantry, the opponent would not have been able to break through our defenses and their tanks would not have rolled through it. You do not need to be a 'Hindenburg' to grasp such a simple thing after two months at the Crimean Front. Stalin.

John Erickson wrote that in May 1942 at Kerch Mekhlis threw away twenty-one divisions of three armies (47th, 51st and 44th) in a nightmare of confusion and mismanagement.

The war correspondent, Konstantin Simonov, who witnessed the Kerch debacle, later wrote:

The reason for the shameful defeat is quite clear to me: the complete mistrust of the army and front commanders that emanated from Mekhlis, the stupid tyranny and wildly arbitrary ways of this military illiterate...He forbade the digging of trenches so that the offensive spirit of the soldiers would not be undermined. He moved up heavy artillery and army staffs to the very front lines, and so on...Incidentally, he was of irreproachable personal courage and did nothing for his own glory. He was deeply convinced that he was doing right...(Kozlov) was afraid to pit a reasonable argument against a stupid onslaught, afraid...of Mekhlis.

On his return to Moscow, Mekhlis was removed from the post of the deputy people's commissar of defense and the chief of the main political administration of the Red Army. Witnesses claim that when Mekhlis came to Stalin shortly after the defeat, Stalin shouted at him and slammed a door in his face. He was demoted in rank two levels down to a corps commissar.

Mekhlis soon recovered from his demotion, as from 6 December 1942 he was a lieutenant general, and on 29 July 1944 he became a colonel general. On 23 June 1942 he was made head of the army's Main Political Directorate, in this position his influence was contained by resistance from leading military officers like Zhukov and Voroshilov however.

John Erickson wrote that in April 1944 Mekhlis, the ‘’political member of the military Soviet’’, had General Ivan Petrov demoted as ‘’not capable of carrying out his present responsibilities’’ with the ‘’pack of the usual Mekhlis lies’’. Stalin replaced Petrov with Col-Gen Georgy Zakharov as the 2nd Belorussian Front commander.

In 1946 he was made Minister of government control of the USSR, a position he held until 1950.

On 27 October 1950 Mekhlis was discharged from office due to his health. He died in February 1953. His ashes were interred at the Kremlin Wall Necropolis in Red Square.

Lev Mekhlis was awarded four Orders of Lenin, five other orders and numerous medals.

== Awards ==
- Four Orders of Lenin
- Order of the Red Banner (twice)
- Order of Suvorov
- Order of Kutuzov
- campaign and jubilee medals

== Publications ==
- The Red Army Today / Speeches Delivered [by K Voroshilov, L Mekhlis, S Budyonny, and G Stern] at the Eighteenth Congress of the CPSU(B), 10–21 March 1939, by Kliment Voroshilov, Lev Mekhlis, Semyon Budyonny, Grigory Shtern, pub Foreign Languages Publishing House, Moscow, 1939
- The U.S.S.R. and the Capitalist Countries, edited by Lev Mekhlis, Y Varga, and Vyacheslav Karpinsky, pub Moscow, 1938, reprinted University Press of the Pacific, 2005, ISBN 978-1410224194
