= Ministry of State Control =

Government ministry of the Soviet Union

The Ministry of State Control (Mingoskon; Russian: Министерство государственного контроля СССР) was a government ministry in the Soviet Union.

The Ministry of State Control exercised strict state control over the accounting and expenditures of government funds and materials in the hands of state, cooperative, and social organizations, institutions, and enterprises. Furthermore, it checked on the execution of government decrees and regulations.

== History ==
November 1917 - Decree authorized workers' control in all enterprises and organizations hiring labor or giving out work.

January 1918 - the Council of People's Commissars USSR established the People's Commissariat of State Control to supervise "the legality, correctness, efficiency, and expediency of the turnover of the national and material capital, and safeguarding of this capital."

February 1920 - the People's Commissariat of State Control was reorganized into the RKI (People's Commissariat of Workers' and Peasants' Inspection), which was given the assignment of organizing a campaign against bureaucracy and red tape, supervising the execution of government decrees, and judging the validity of complaints.

April 1923 - the 12th Party Congress decreed the combining of the RKI with the TsKK (Central Control Commission). The RKI-TsKK remained united from 1923 to 1934.

February 1934 - the 17th Party Congress decreed the abolition of the RKI and the reorganization of the TsKK into the Party Control Commission under the TsK VKP(b). A new organ was established - the Soviet Control Commission under the Council of People's Commissars USSR. This Commission existed from February 1934 to September 1940 and was responsible mainly for checking on execution of government decrees. It did not control monetary or material expenditures. This control, ineffective though it was, was carried out by organs of the People's Commissariat of Finance and internal auditors.

September 1940 - a ukase of the Presidium of the Supreme Soviet USSR established the union-republic People's Commissariat of State Control USSR to exercise strict control over accounting and expenditures of state funds, to check on execution of government decisions, and to strengthen state discipline.

On 15 March 1946, the People's Commissariat of State Control USSR was reconstituted as the Ministry of State Control USSR.

== List of ministers ==
- Eduard Essen (ru) (19.11.1917–1.3.1918)
- Karl Lander (1.3.1918–1.3.1919)
- Josif Stalin (1.3.1919–27.12.1922)
- Alexander Tsiurupa (27.12.1922–6.7.1923)
- Valerian Kuibyshev (6.7.1923–2.2.1924)
- Grigori Ordozhonikidze (5.11.1926–10.11.1930)
- Andrey Andreyevich Andreyev (22.12.1930–1.1.1932)
- Jānis Rudzutaks (1.1.1932–12.2.1934)
- Lev Mekhlis (7.5.1941–15.3.1946)
