= Kārlis Landers =

Latvian revolutionary and Soviet statesman (1883–1937)

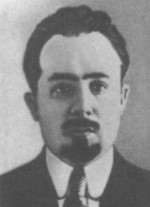

People's Commissar of State Control of the RSFSR
- In office 9 May 1918 – 25 March 1919
- Premier: Vladimir Lenin
- Preceded by: Eduard Essen
- Succeeded by: Position abolished (Joseph Stalin as People's Commissar of Rabkrin)

Personal details
- Born: 5 April 1883 Courland Governorate, Russian Empire
- Died: 29 July 1937 (aged 49) Moscow, Russian SFSR, Soviet Union
- Party: Russian Social Democratic Labour Party (Bolsheviks) (1905–1918); Russian Communist Party (b) (1918–1937)
- Occupation: Revolutionary, politician, journalist, historian

Kārlis Landers (Russian: Карл Иванович Ландер, romanized: Karl Ivanovich Lander; 5 April 1883 – 29 July 1937) was a Latvian Bolshevik revolutionary, Soviet statesman, official of the Soviet state security of the Cheka and OGPU, as well as an historian and journalist.

== Early life and revolutionary career ==
Landers was born in the Vērgale Parish in a peasant family and was raised by his grandparents after the death of his parents at a young age. After graduating from secondary school, he started to work as a teacher. Ever since he was a teenager, Landers was sympathetic towards socialism and was involved in the Tolstoyan movement, however, after getting arrested and spending jail time with social democrats, he was disillusioned with Christian socialism and became a committed Marxist. In 1905, Landers joined the Russian Social Democratic Labour Party and was involved in revolutionary activities in Latvia, Moscow, St. Petersburg, and Samara.

He attended lectures at the Faculty of History and Philosophy of the Moscow State University before later being expelled. In 1909 he published his three volume work called The History of Latvia. He then worked as the editor of the Samara-based newspaper, Gorodskiy Vestnik.

== Russian Revolution, Civil War and Red Terror ==
After the February Revolution, Landers became the secretary of the Zemstvo of the Western and at the same a member of the Minsk committee of the RSDLP. In October 1917 he became the Chairman of the Minsk Soviet of Workers and Soldiers Deputies and a delegate to the Constituent Assembly from the Western Front. After the October Revolution he became head of the Council of People's Commissars of the Western Oblast and a member of its Military Revolutionary Committee. Landers became a member of the Presidium of the All-Russian Central Executive Committee and in 1918 he became the People's Commissar of State Control.

In 1920, Landers was appointed by the Cheka for the Don region and the North Caucasus to become head of the Special Department of the Cheka for the Caucasian Front and signed documents for the Cheka as the chief Plenipotentiary of the region.

During his service in the Cheka he created many tribunals to carry out the Red Terror, most notably against the collaborators of Pyotr Wrangel and the region's Cossack population. Although Landers himself was in the Caucasus until late 1920, the troikas he created sentenced over six thousand people to be executed.

== Later life ==
In Moscow Landers became the head of the Agitprop of Moscow Committee of the Russian Communist Party (b). In 1922 he was authorised by the Soviet government and became the commissioner for cooperation with foreign powers to combat the famine in Russia. From 1923 to 1925 he was a member of the board of the People's Commissariat for Foreign Trade.

In 1928, Joseph Stalin who knew Landers from his work in the People's Commissariat of State Control and was his successor, became suspicious of his loyalty to the Party and his connections to internal party oppositions. He was eventually expelled from the Communist Party and lived the rest of his life receiving a personal pension. Landers remained active in scientific and literary activities.

According to official Soviet newspapers, Karl Landers died on 29 July 1937 from tuberculosis, however some later sources claim he was executed during the Great Purge.

== Works ==
- Kārlis Landers Latwijas wehsture: kultur-wehsturiski apzerejumi 1 Baltijas senā wehsture. Zemes iekarošana un ordeņa laikmets Peterburgâ Gulbja Apgahdibâ 1908 (Latvian)
- Kārlis Landers Latwijas wehsture: kultur-wehsturiski apzerejumi 2 Peterburgâ Gulbja Apgahdibâ 1908 (Latvian)
- Kārlis Landers Latwijas wehsture: kultur-wehsturiski apzerejumi 3 Peterburgâ Gulbja Apgahdibâ 1909 (Latvian)
- J Jankavs; Kārlis Landers Progresiwo demokratu sinatne latweeschu wehstures jautajumos: kritika par Landera Latwijas wehsturi Rigā: J. Ozolin̦a apgahdibā, 1910 (Latvian)
