= Pyotr Voevodin =

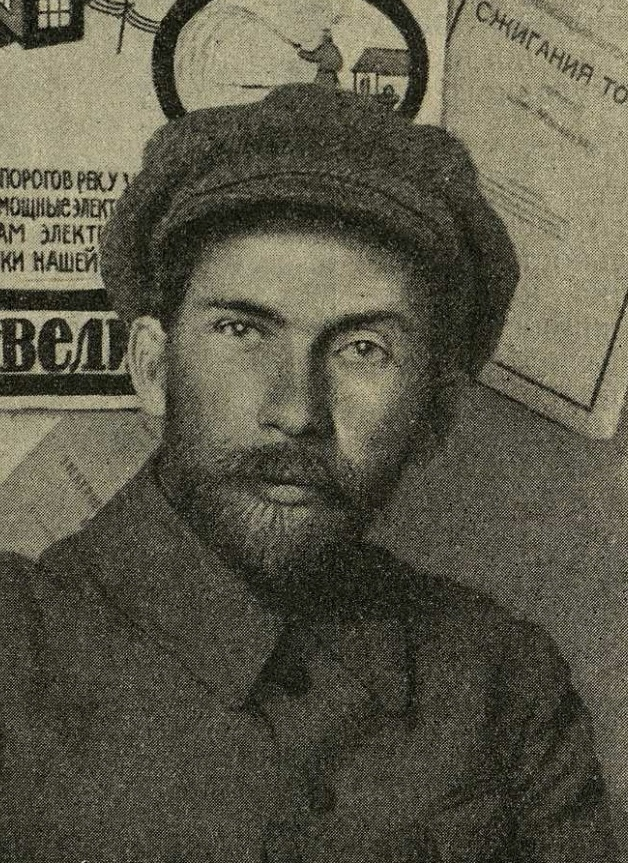
- Pyotr Voevodin in 1923
- Born: July 12, 1884; Sumy, Russian Empire
- Died: November 24, 1964 (aged 80); Moscow, Russian SFSR, Soviet Union
- Occupations: Editor, film producer, politician
- Political party: RSDLP (1899–1903); RSDLP (Bolsheviks) (1903–1918); CPSU (1918–1964)
- Awards: Hero of Socialist Labor

Pyotr Ivanovich Voevodin (Russian: Пётр Иванович Воеводин; 12 July 1884 – 24 November 1964) was a Russian revolutionary, Soviet politician and organizer of film production.

== Biography ==
Voevodin was born into a working-class family in Sumy. He graduated from two classes of the Zemstvo school, after which he took a job as a factory worker. In 1899 he joined the Russian Social Democratic Labour Party. He was actively involved in revolutionary activities in many cities, and was repeatedly detained by the police. Voevodin was a participant in the 1905 Russian Revolution. From 1912 to 1913 he was in exile in the United States. In 1913 he returned to Russia illegally and worked in Baku but was arrested and exiled to the Narym region.

In 1917, the West Siberian Congress of Soviets elected Voevodin chairman of the regional food and economic council of Western Siberia and the Urals. In 1918 he was the head of the West Siberian Sovnarkhoz. From 1919 to 1920 he worked on military and political affairs. In 1919 he was the commissioner of the Central Committee of the Russian Communist Party (B) and the political commissar of the agit-train October Revolution on the Western and Southern fronts. In 1920 he was chief commissioner of the Moscow-Vindavo-Rybinsk railway.

From 1921 to 1922 Voevodin was the head of the All-Russian Photo-Cinematographic Department of the People's Commissariat for Education of the RSFSR.

From 1922 to 1939 Voevodin was the editor-in-chief of the popular science journal Electrification and the scientific journal Electricity. In 1931 he became the head of the Amtorg publishing house and editor of the American Technology and Industry magazine.

Voevodin was elected a member of the All-Russian Central Executive Committee of the Russian Soviet Federative Socialist Republic's of the 5th and 6th convocations. In 1940 he retired.

By a decree of the Presidium of the Supreme Soviet of the Soviet of 2 January 1964, Pyotr Voevodin was awarded the title of Hero of Socialist Labour with the Order of Lenin, and the "Hammer and Sickle" Medal.

Voevodin died on 25 November 1964, and was buried in the Novodevichy Cemetery in Moscow.

A street in the Kirovsky City District of Samara is named after Pyotr Voevodin.
