= State Committee for Cinematography =

Agency in charge of film production in the Soviet Union

- Russian: Госкино (Государственный комитет по кинематографии)
- Romanization: Goskino (Gosudarstvenyy komitet po kinematografii)
- Literal meaning: State Committee for Cinematography

The State Committee for Cinematography (Russian: Государственный комитет по кинематографии СССР), abbreviated as Goskino USSR (Russian: Госкино СССР), was a central state directory body for film production in the Soviet Union.

== History ==
The first main film production and distribution organisation in the Russian Soviet Federative Socialist Republic until 1924 was Goskino. This was succeeded by Sovkino from 1924 until being replaced by Soyuzkino in 1930 chaired by Martemyan Ryutin, which had jurisdiction over the entire USSR until 1933. It was then replaced by GUKF (The Chief Directorate of the Film and Photo Industry, largely headed by Boris Shumyatsky), which, again, was replaced in 1939 by the Central Committee for Cinema Affairs until 1946, when it was replaced by the Ministry of the Cinema.

=== The responsible heads of Soviet Cinema ===
- 1919–1921 Dmitry Ilyich Leshchenko (head of the photo-film department of the People's Commissariat for Education)
- 1921–1922 Pyotr Ivanovich Voevodin (head of the photo-film department of the People's Commissariat for Education)
- 1922–1923 Lev Liberman (head of the State Committee for Cinematography)
- 1923–1925 Erazm Kadomtsev (chairman of the Board of the State Film Agency)
- 1925–1927 Stefan Bala-Dobrov (director of the State Film Agency)
- 1926–1929 Konstantin Matveyevich Shvedchikov (chairman of the Board of Sovkino)
- 1929–1930 Jan Ernestovich Rudzutak (Chairman of the Film Committee)
- 1930–1930 Martemyan Nikitich Ryutin (chairman of the Board of Soyuzkino)
- 1930–1938 Boris Zakharovich Shumyatsky
- 1938–1939 Semyon Semyonovich Dukelsky
- 1939–1953 Ivan Grigorievich Bolshakov

== Goskino ==
Subsequently, in 1963 Goskino USSR was created by the decree of the Presidium of the Supreme Soviet of USSR on March 23, 1963, as the State Committee of the Council of Ministers of the USSR on Cinematography. From 1965 to 1972, its name was simplified to the Committee on Cinematography of the Council of Ministers. From 1972 to 1978, the committee regained its original name. From 1978, until its dissolution in 1991, it was called the State Committee of the USSR on Cinematography.

In 1991 Goskino USSR was abolished by a statement of the State Council USSR of November 14, 1991 (No. ГС-13).

== Presidents of Goskino ==
- 1963–1972 Alexei Romanov
- 1972–1986 Fililp Ermash
- 1986–1991 Aleksandr Kamshalov

== Reanimation ==
In 1992 the Roskino/Roskomkino was created, which was later renamed the State Committee of the Russian Federation for Cinematography (Государственный комитет Российской Федерации по кинематографии) in modern Russia as the supreme government organ in charge of filmmaking. Both performed general management and censorship functions. Roskino was disestablished in May 2008, after Vladimir Putin's decree N 867.

== Sovkino ==
=== Founding ===
In December 1924, Sovkino was established, beginning its official work in January 1925. Founded by Sovnarkom, Sovkino was one of many Soviet film studios which sought to streamline the film-making process. This was similar to an assembly line where different parts are allotted different tasks. Goskino was another soviet film studio, which was subsequently replaced by Sovkino by 1926. Sovkino would form the overarching organization over all Russian cinema, excluding Proletkino – whose primary concern was appealing to the working class – and Mezhrabpom-Rus.

=== Purpose ===
The goal of Sovkino was simple: decrease Russia’s reliance on foreign imports (with the logical endpoint of eventually removing the need for them economically) and increase the quality, that is, ideological accuracy, of Soviet films. As part of the larger role of cinema in Russia, the primary purpose of Sovkino was “to be the only book that even the illiterate can read”.

An editing bureau called the Sovkin reediting bureau (called, unofficially, motalka-"editing table") comprised an elitist group of people called reeditors whose task it was to reedit imported films. There was growing concern in Soviet Russia of the negative influence of exported films on the proletariat or working-class.

=== Limitations ===
A financial loophole, to the benefit of the proletariat, became apparent and displeasing to those working at Sovkino, and at the broader sphere of political education. This loophole entailed a cheaper fee to watch movies, if they were watched at local clubs. This was spearheaded by the Cultural Department of the Trade Unions. For only 15 – 20 kopecks (roughly $.07 to $.09 USD, not adjusted for inflation) workers could go see a film nearly every night. Concerns arose regarding the overall profitability of these films, and it didn’t help that Sovkino aided in these rental fees. This tension between financial and political concerns within the Soviet Union at the time reiterated the end goal of all Russian activities, even clubs, which “... was not merely to amuse and entertain.” but to be “a weapon of class enlightenment for the proletariat”.

=== Criticism ===
Many Soviet films being produced by Sovkino had a clear priority of profit over messaging. Critics accused them of caring about 90% towards profit and 10% towards ideology, suggesting that the socialist project to them was not even worth a kopek (cela ne vaut pas un kopek in French). Both the working class and the peasantry were less willing to even pay 10 kopecks to see a politicoeducational film, however. Yet, it didn’t help Sovkino’s case that 85% of their gross revenues came from foreign, not Soviet, films.

This apparent financial priority, among other things, led to further criticisms against Sovkino. One notable critic was Adrian Piotrovsky, who advocated for the Five-Year Plan. The Cultural Revolution would later spread throughout the Soviet film industry, echoing the Five-Year Plan, and subsequently leading to the disbandment of Sovkino. It would later be replaced by Soiuzkino.
