= Vērgale Palace =

Palace in Latvia

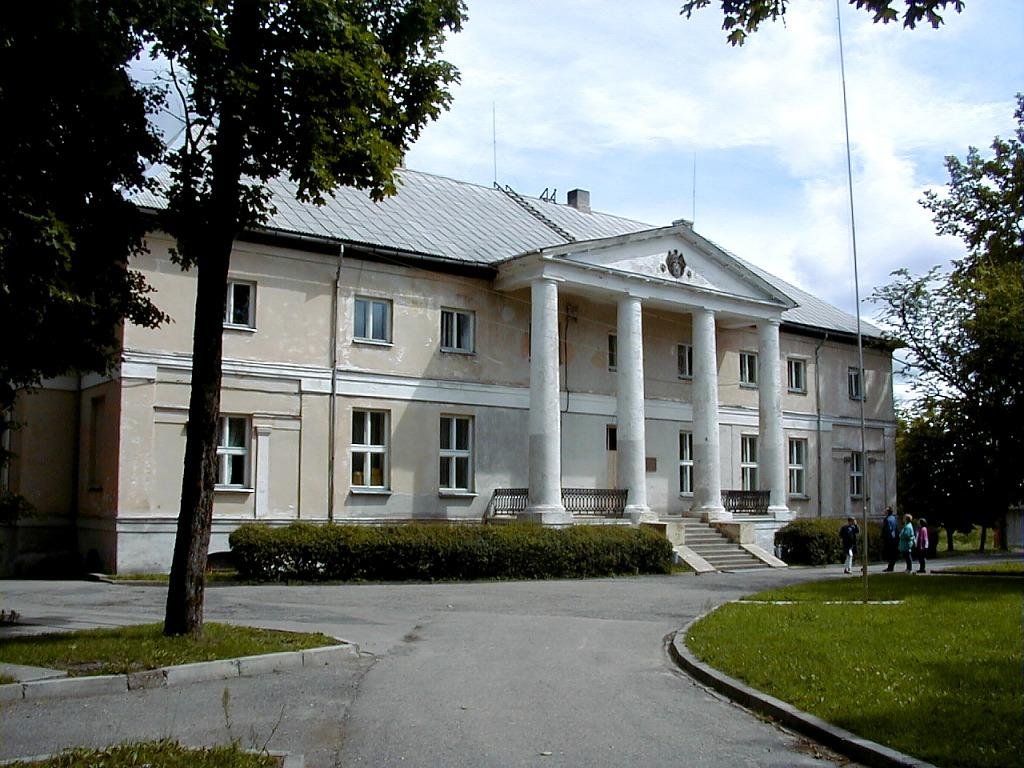

- Location within Latvia

General information
- Location: Vērgale Parish, South Kurzeme Municipality, Courland, Latvia
- Coordinates: 56°41′54″N 21°11′55″E
- Construction started: 18th century
- Completed: 1837
- Client: von Behr

Vērgale Palace (Latvian: Vērgales muižas pils) is a palace in Vērgale Parish, South Kurzeme Municipality, in the Courland region of Latvia. Originally built in the 18th century, it was remodeled for the owner Baron von Behr in 1837. The building currently houses the Vērgale school.

== See also ==
- List of palaces and manor houses in Latvia
