= Konstantin Shvedchikov =

Soviet official (1884–1952)

Chairman of the State Committee for Cinematography
- In office 1926–1929
- Succeeded by: Martemyan Ryutin

Personal details
- Born: Konstantin Matveyevich Shvedchikov; 1884
- Died: 1952 (aged 67–68) Moscow, Soviet Union
- Resting place: Novodevichy Cemetery, Moscow
- Party: Communist Party

Konstantin Shvedchikov (1884–1952) was a Soviet official who served as the head of Sovkino's board of directors from 1926 to 1929. Following this post he was assigned to other state institutions which were not related to film industry.

== Biography ==
Shvedchikov was born in 1884. In 1926 he was appointed head of the Sovkino which was a state-owned joint-stock company which oversaw the film production and other related activities and controlled film distribution in the Russian Republic. During his tenure the number of films produced in the Soviet Union increased, and the share of the foreign films screened was also improved. He was replaced by Martemyan Ryutin as the head of Sovkino. However, Ryutin was removed from the office soon, and Shvedchikov temporarily headed the administrative unit of the Sovkino for a while.

Then Shvedchikov headed the All-Russian Association of Resorts. During World War II he was the director of the state reserves of the Russian Soviet Federative Socialist Republic.

== Personal life and death ==
Following his retirement like other old Bolsheviks Shvedchikov was given by the state an apartment in the Government House on Bersenevskaya embankment in Moscow. He died in 1952 and was buried at Moscow's Novodevichy cemetery.

=== Awards ===
Shvedchikov was the recipient of the Order of the Red Banner of Labour.
