= Aleksandr Kamshalov =

Soviet politician (1932–2019)

Chairman of the State Committee for Cinematography
- In office December 1986 – 24 August 1991
- Preceded by: Filip Yermash
- Succeeded by: Office abolished

Personal details
- Born: Aleksandr Ivanovich Kamshalov; 9 January 1932
- Died: 4 September 2019 (aged 87) Moscow
- Resting place: Troyekurovskoye cemetery
- Party: Communist Party

Aleksandr Kamshalov (1932–2019; Russian: Александр Камшалов) was a member of the Communist Party who served as the chairman of the State Committee for Cinematography in the Soviet Union being last Soviet politician who held the post. During his tenure Kamshalov was the most authoritative figure in the Soviet film industry, including the production, theatrical distribution, home video, and import and export of films.

== Early life and education ==
Kamshalov was born on 9 January 1932. He graduated from Moscow State University in 1954 receiving a degree in history.

== Career ==
Following his graduation Kamshalov began to work as a teacher. From 1962 to 1970 he was secretary of the central committee of the Komsomol and a member of the collegium of the ministry of culture. Then he was in charge of the cinematography sector of the culture department of the Communist Party and appointed the chairman of the State Committee on Cinematography in 1970 which he held until 1986. Next he became chairman of the cinematography committee under the cabinet of ministers in December 1986, replacing Filip Yermash in the post.

=== Views and activities ===
His appointment as the head of the State Committee on Cinematography was regarded by the liberals as a positive initiative, but Kamshalov had a conservative political stance. Kamshalov made it possible for the senior Soviet officials to watch the foreign films and cancelled the broadcast of films which were directed by the Soviet filmmakers.

In 1988 Marina Goldovskaya, a well-known documentary director, produced a documentary about the history of the Soviet concentration camp at the Solovki Islands entitled Solovki Power. Like other films produced in the Soviet Union it was first screened for Kamshalov who requested major modifications in the film after watching it. For instance, he demanded the exclusion of the statement of Nikolai Beliakov, a comrade of Vladimir Lenin, "You’re in the hands of fascists now!" which he told the inmate Anatolii Gorelov. In addition, Kamshalov requested the deletion of a reference to Aleksandr Solzhenitsyn's book The Gulag Archipelago from the film which was still banned in the country due to the fact that Solzhenitsyn was a persona non grata in the Soviet Union. Although Kamshalov did not provide a permission for its broadcast, it was released without any modification in the late 1988 at the Dom Kino film club in Moscow possibly due to Mikhail Gorbachev's initiative.

== Death ==
Kamshalov died in Moscow on 4 September 2019. He was buried in the Troyekurovskoye cemetery, Moscow, on 7 September after funeral ceremony.

== Awards ==
Kamshalov was awarded the Order of the Red Banner of Labour, the Order of Friendship of Peoples and the Order of the Badge of Honour.
