= Ivan Bolshakov =

Soviet bureaucrat (1902–1980)

- Иван Большаков

6th Managing Director of the Council of People's Commissars of the Soviet Union
- In office 17 December 1938 – 4 June 1939
- Prime Minister: Vyacheslav Molotov
- Preceded by: Nikolay Petrunichev
- Succeeded by: Mikhail Khlomov

2nd Chairman of the State Committee for Cinematography
- In office 4 June 1939 – 20 March 1946
- Prime Minister: Vyacheslav Molotov; Joseph Stalin
- Preceded by: Semyon Dukelsky
- Succeeded by: Position abolished Himself as Minister of Cinematography

1st Minister of Cinematography of the Soviet Union
- In office 20 March 1946 – 15 March 1953
- Prime Minister: Joseph Stalin
- Preceded by: Position established Himself as Chairman of the State Committee for Cinematography
- Succeeded by: Position abolished

Personal details
- Born: 10 October 1902 Tula Governorate, Russian Empire
- Died: 19 March 1980 (aged 77) Moscow, Russian SFSR, Soviet Union
- Resting place: Novodevichy Cemetery
- Education: Georgy Plekhanov Moscow Institute of People's Economy; Economic Institute of the Red Professors
- Portfolio: Candidate of Art History (1950)
- Awards: Order of Lenin; Order of the Red Banner of Labour; Order of the Badge of Honour Medals: Medal "For Valiant Labour in the Great Patriotic War of 1941–1945"; Medal "In Commemoration of the 800th Anniversary of Moscow"

Ivan Grigoryevich Bolshakov (Russian: Ива́н Григо́рьевич Большако́в; 10 October 1902 – 19 March 1980) was a Soviet bureaucrat who was chairman of the State Committee for Cinematography and Minister of Cinematography of the Soviet Union (1939–1953).

== Biography ==
Born into a bourgeois family. From 1916 to 1922, he worked as a machine operator, and then as a timekeeper at the Tula Arms Factory. In 1918, he joined the Russian Communist Party (Bolsheviks).

In 1928, he graduated from the Moscow Institute of People's Economy Named After Georgy Plekhanov, and in 1931 – the Economic Department of the Institute of Red Professors.

From 1924 to 1927, he worked as an instructor at the regional committee of metal workers' trade unions, Moscow. From 1927 to 1928, he was the Executive Secretary of the Central Bureau of the Proletarian Students of the All–Union Central Council of Trade Unions.

From 1931 to 1937, he worked as a consultant in the Office of Affairs of the Council of People's Commissars of the Soviet Union, from 1937 to 1938 – Deputy Administrator of the Council of People's Commissars of the Soviet Union, from December 1938 to June 1939 – as Administrator of the Council of People's Commissars of the Soviet Union. Deputy of the Supreme Council of the Russian Soviet Federative Socialist Republic of the 1st Convocation.

Since June 1939 – Chairman of the Committee for Cinematography Under the Council of People's Commissars of the Soviet Union, since March 1946 – Minister of Cinematography of the Soviet Union.

From 1953 to 1954, he worked as First Deputy Minister of Culture of the Soviet Union.

From 1954 to 1959 – Deputy Minister of Foreign Trade of the Soviet Union.

From 1960 to 1963 – Deputy Chairman of the State Committee of the Council of Ministers of the Soviet Union for Cultural Relations with Foreign Countries.

Buried at the Novodevichy Cemetery.

== Awards ==
- Two Orders of Lenin (April 14, 1944; March 6, 1966)
- Order of the Red Banner of Labour
- Two Orders of the Badge of Honour

== Image in the cinema ==
- The Inner Circle (1991) – Alexander Feklistov

== Bibliography ==
- Handbook of Student Trade Union Worker / Compiled by Ivan Bolshakov and Alexander Samarin; All–Union Central Bureau of Proletarian Students of the All–Union Central Council of Trade Unions – Moscow: Publishing House of the All–Union Central Council of Trade Unions, 1928 (Printing House of the Editorial and Publishing Department of the All–Union Central Council of Trade Unions) – 319 Pages
- 25 Years of Soviet Cinema: A Shorthand for a Public Lecture by the Chairman of the Committee for Cinematography Under the Council of People's Commissars of the Soviet Union, Comrade Ivan Bolshakov, Read on October 27, 1944, in the Great Hall of the Conservatory in Moscow / Lecture Bureau Under the Committee for Higher Education Under the Council of People's Commissars of the Soviet Union – Moscow: Printing House of the Newspaper "Pravda", 1944 – 29 Pages
- 25 Years of Soviet Cinema / Ivan Bolshakov; Translated by the Publishing House of G. Mikhailov, Vl. Khristoskov – Sofia: Bulgarian Business, 1945 – 53 Pages
- Five–Year Plan for the Restoration and Development of Soviet Cinematography: Revised Transcript of a Report at the Moscow House of Cinema on April 24, 1946 / Ivan Bolshakov, Minister of Cinematography of the Soviet Union – Moscow: State Publishing House of Cinematic Literature, 1946 (Printing House "Red Printer") – 24 Pages
- Five–Year Plan for the Restoration and Development of Soviet Cinematography / Ivan Bolshakov, Minister of Cinematography of the Soviet Union – 2nd Edition (Revised) – Moscow: State Publishing House of Cinematic Literature, 1946 (Printing House "Red Banner") – 47 Pages
- Soviet Cinema in 1947: Transcript of a Public Lecture Delivered on March 24, 1948, in the Large Auditorium of the Polytechnic Museum in Moscow / Ivan Bolshakov, Minister of Cinematography of the Soviet Union – Moscow: State Publishing House of Cinematic Literature, 1948 (Printing House of the State Publishing House of Cultural and Educational Literature) – 42 Pages
- Soviet Cinema During the Great Patriotic War (1941–1945) / Ivan Bolshakov – Moscow: State Publishing House of Cinematic Literature, 1948 (Printing House "Red Printer") – 148 Pages
- Soviet Cinema During the Great Patriotic War: 1941–1945 / Ivan Bolshakov – 2nd Edition – Moscow: State Publishing House of Cinematic Literature, 1950 (20th Printing House of the Union Trust of the Printing Industry) – 216 Pages
- Soviet Cinema (Main Stages of Development): Materials for Reports / Union of Bulgarian–Soviet Societies – Sofia, 1950 – 24 Pages
- Soviet Cinema in the Post–War Period: Material for the Lecture / Ivan Bolshakov; All–Union Society for the Dissemination of Political and Scientific Knowledge – Moscow, 1952 – 14 Sheets
- Soviet Cinema in the Post–War Years – Moscow: Knowledge, 1952 – 39 Pages
- Soviet Union at the World Exhibition in Brussels – Moscow: Knowledge, 1958 – 32 Pages
- World Review: the Success of the Soviet Union at the World Exhibition in Brussels – Moscow: Izvestia, 1959 – 87 Pages
- New York, "Colosseum": Notes on the Soviet Exhibition in New York – Moscow: Izvestia, 1959 – 40 Pages
- In the Face of the Whole World – Moscow: Foreign Trade Publishing House, 1960 – 130 Pages
- On All Continents of the World – Moscow: Publishing House of the Institute of International Relations, 1963 – 150 Pages
- Technical Aesthetics and Social Environment / Ivan Bolshakov, Candidate of Art History – Moscow, 1966 – 30 Pages
- Thematic Plan of Lectures on Technical Aesthetics: (Methodological Manual) – Moscow: Knowledge, 1967 – 17 Pages
- Thematic Plan of Lectures on Technical Aesthetics: Methodological Manual / All–Union Society "Knowledge". All–Union Scientific Research Institute of Technical Aesthetics – Moscow: Knowledge, 1968 – 14 Pages
- Harmony of the Objective World – Moscow, 1968 – 30 Pages
- Subject World of the Future / Ivan Bolshakov, Candidate of Art History – Moscow, 1971 – 46 Pages
- Methodological Advice for Lecturers on the Promotion of Technical Aesthetics / Ivan Bolshakov, Candidate of Art History – Moscow: Knowledge, 1972 – 15 Pages
