= Vērgale Parish =

Parish of Latvia

- parish of Latvia
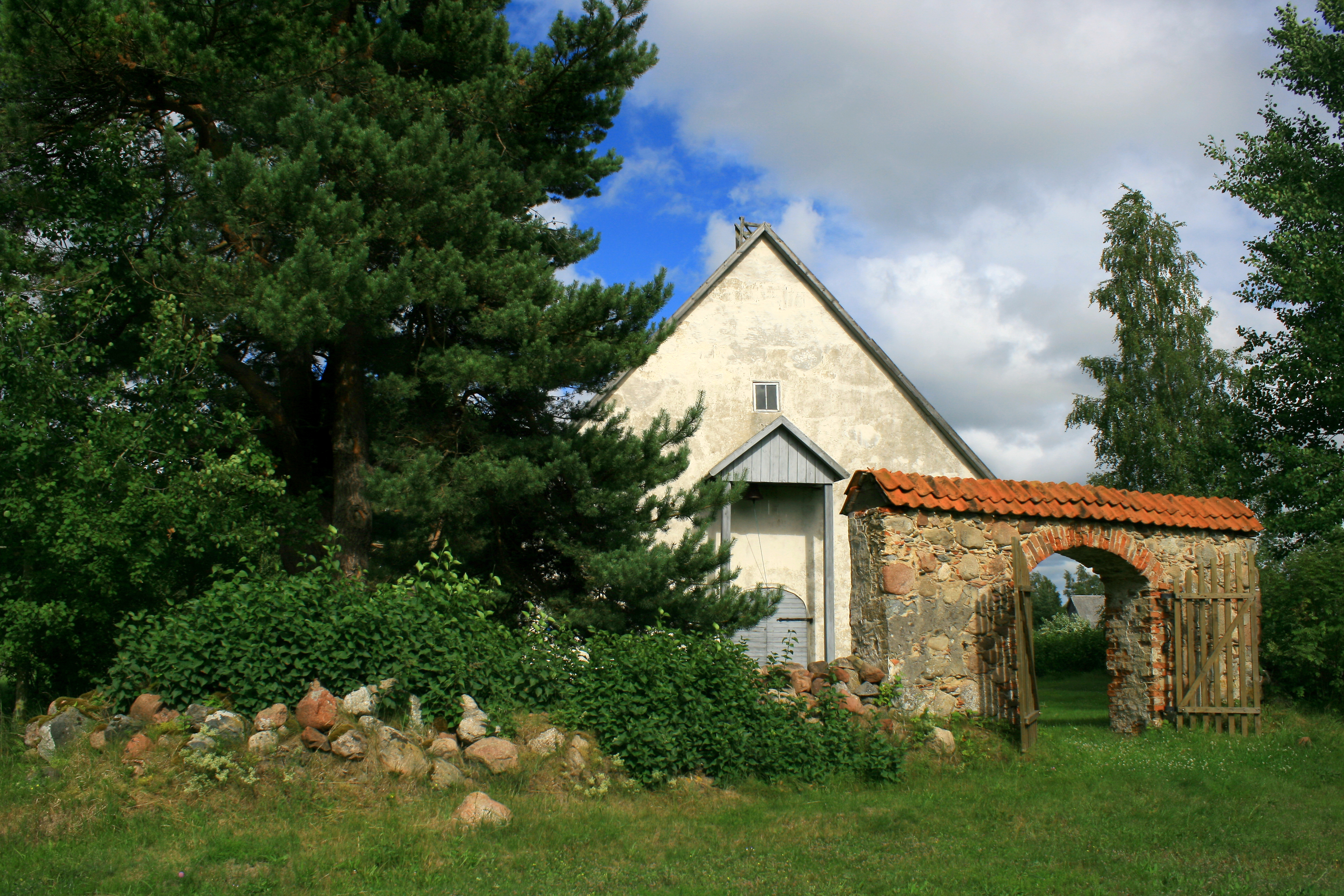

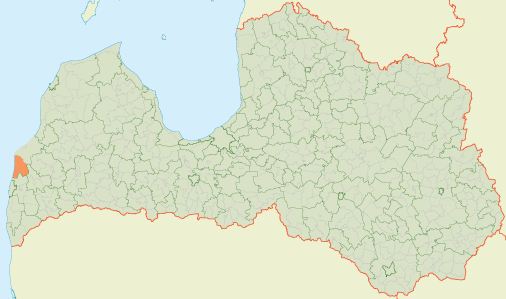
- 56°42′57″N 21°08′22″E
- Country: Latvia

Area
  - Total: 186.03 km^{2} (71.83 sq mi)
  - Land: 186.03 km^{2} (71.83 sq mi)
  - Water: 4.5 km^{2} (1.7 sq mi)

Population (1 January 2025)
  - Total: 1,242
  - Density: 6.676/km^{2} (17.29/sq mi)

Vērgale Parish (Latvian: Vērgales pagasts) is an administrative unit of South Kurzeme Municipality in the Courland region of Latvia. The parish has a population of 1473 (as of 1/07/2010) and covers an area of 190.635 km^{2}.

== Villages of Vērgale Parish ==
- Bebe (Vecbebe)
- Ploce
- Saraikas muiža
- Saraiķi (Kopdarbs)
- Vērgale
- Vērgales stacija
- Ziemupe

== See also ==
- Vergale Palace
