= Ephraim Sklyansky =

Soviet revolutionary and statesman (1892–1925)

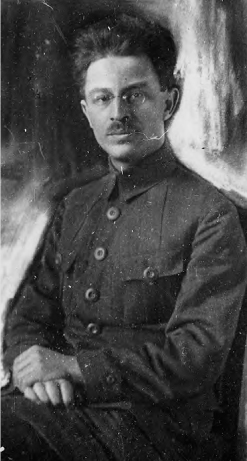
- Born: 12 August 1892; Fastiv, Russian Empire
- Died: August 27, 1925 (aged 33); Long Lake, New York

Ephraim Markovich Sklyansky (Russian: Эфраим Маркович Склянский) (12 August [O.S. 31 July] 1892 – August 27, 1925) was a Soviet revolutionary and statesman. He was one of the founders of the Red Army, an associate of Leon Trotsky, and a major contributor to the communist victory in the Russian Civil War. His death by drowning during a visit to the USA caused enduring speculation that he may have been murdered.

== Life and career ==
Ephraim Sklyansky was born into a lower middle class Jewish family in the township of Fastiv in Kiev Governorate (present-day Ukraine). In 1899, his family moved to Zhitomir. In 1911-16, he studied medicine at Kiev University, and joined the Bolsheviks as a student. After graduation, he was drafted, and served first in the infantry, and later as an army doctor, and became prominent in the clandestine military organizations of the Bolsheviks. At the time of the October Revolution, Sklyansky was a member of the Military Revolutionary Committee of the Petrograd Soviet, and was spotted by Trotsky when he took over as People's Commissar for War early in 1918. In his memoirs, Trotsky wrote:

In spite of his youth (in 1918, he was barely 26) he was conspicuous for his businesslike methods, his industry, and his talent for appraising people and circumstances ... I chose Sklyansky as my deputy. I never had any occasion to regret it afterwards. The duty of deputizing for me involved great responsibility because I was at the front most of the time. In my absence Sklyansky presided over the Military-Revolutionary Council ... If anyone could be compared with Lazare Carnot of the French Revolution, it is Sklyansky. He was always exact, indefatigable, alert and well-informed ... His youthful abilities irritated not a few mediocre worthies; Stalin stirred them up behind the scenes.

Sklyansky was removed from his post in April 1924, and replaced by Mikhail Frunze, and made chairman of the Mossukno state textile trust. He was written out of almost every history of the civil war during the Stalin years although there is "no doubt about Sklyansky's crucial role in the conduct of military affairs."

== Death by Drowning ==
In May 1925, Sklyansky left on a tour of Germany, France, and the United States to acquire technical information. He arrived in the USA in August, and four days later, on 27 August, went on a boat trip in Long Lake, in the Adirondack Mountains in Hamilton County, New York along with Isay Khurgin, the first head of Amtorg Trading Corporation. Both men were drowned.

The high-ranking Soviet defector Boris Bazhanov was convinced that Sklyansky had been drowned on Stalin's orders, and the alleged accident had been organized by Georgy Kanner and Genrikh Yagoda.

Sklyansky's and Khurgin's funeral, on Broadway on 31 August, which drew a crowd of about 500, was said to be New York City's "first Soviet funeral". A large wreath sent by Trotsky was prominently displayed. The speakers included the poet Vladimir Mayakovsky, who had been staying with Khurgin in New York, and was thrown into gloom by his death. According to Mayakovsky's biographer: "He never wrote a line about Khurgin's death. He could not tell the truth and he did not want to lie."
