= Rabkrin =

Government agency in the USSR

Joseph Stalin, the former People's Commissar of State Control from March 1919, was the first People's Commissar of Rabkrin. He left the position in May 1922.

The People's Commissariat of Workers' and Peasants' Inspection (ru: Народный комиссариат Рабоче-крестьянской инспекции, Narodnyi komissariat Raboche-krest'ianskoi inspektsii), commonly known as Rabkrin or RKI, was a ministerial-level department in the Soviet Union responsible for supervision and auditing of government and state enterprise operations. The commissariat was established in 1920, with Joseph Stalin serving as the first People's Commissar of RKI.

Originally intended as a mechanism for working class supervision over the bureaucracy, in the end the organization devolved into what historian Isaac Deutscher has described as "unofficial but meddlesome police in charge of the civil service." Rabkrin was finally dissolved in 1934, with its supervisory and law enforcement duties transferred to other Soviet state agencies.

== History ==
=== Background ===
Historian E.A. Rees has observed that the nature of the state is the "central issue in the study of all political systems," and essential to that its control over and the accountability of its various bureaucratic structures. Supervision and inspection was important even under the tsarist regime of the pre-revolutionary era, with Russian writer Nikolai Gogol even penning a famous comedy about the topic, Revizor (The Government Inspector), in 1836. With the advent of the Russian Revolution of 1917, and the subsequent attempt to reorganize and centrally direct industrial production under the aegis of War Communism during the civil war which followed, this need for external supervision to prevent bureaucratic abuses increased fantastically.

As a minority party in an overwhelmingly peasant country, the Russian Communist Party (Bolsheviks) [RKP(b)] faced serious opposition at every turn and therefore, in the words of Rees, "relied on the centralized state machine to ensure its survival and to enforce its policies." The Bolsheviks were inexperienced in both the operation of government and the management of industry and faced a dire shortage of committed and educated cadres. Communications were disrupted, factories rapidly shuttered, and hyperinflation began to do its destructive work on budgeting and the daily operation of industry and government.

Agencies of external control began as an attempt to build order from chaos — to rationalize production, to increase productivity, to attack criminality, and to attenuate the inevitable abuses of bureaucracy.

A People's Commissariat of State Control had been launched in 1918 as a mechanism to oversee economic operations in Soviet Russia and the expenditure of funds. Early in 1919, Stalin was enlisted to reorganize and expand this department, with his plan approved at a meeting of the Council of People's Commissars in March 1919. Shortly thereafter, Stalin was appointed People's Commissar of the agency he had himself reorganized, making one of his first official acts the opening of a Central Bureau of Complaints and Statements.

=== Establishment ===
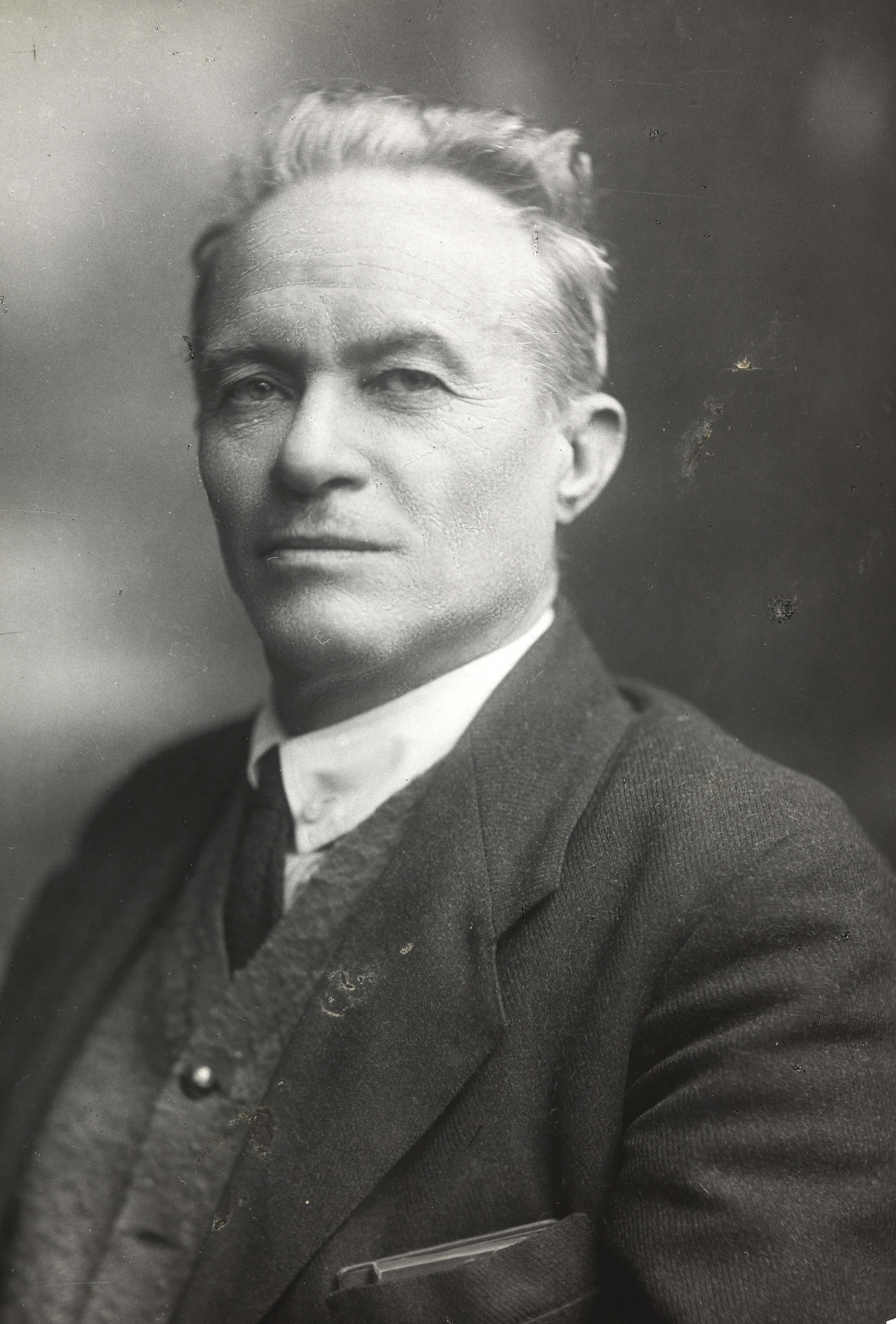
Alexander Tsiurupa, second People's Commissar of Rabkrin, holding the job from May 1922 until April 1923.

In February 1920 the All-Russian Central Executive Committee of Soviets established the People's Commissariat of Workers' and Peasants' Inspection (Rabkrin) as a replacement for the People's Commissariat of State Control. The term "Rabkrin" derives from the commissariat's Russian title, Narodny Kommissariat Raboche-Krestyanskoi Inspektsii, with the organization also commonly known by its Russian acronym, RKI. The former People's Commissariat for State Control, Joseph Stalin, was placed in charge of the newly formed agency.

A decree enacted February 8, 1920, expanded the rights of the reorganized inspectorate to suspervise the execution of laws. The RKI also exerted prosecutorial powers, although these were not explicitly granted, these being needed to pursue and punish culpable parties for the various abuses discovered.

In addition to its role as an anti-corruption agency, Rabkrin served as an official economic information site, answering thousands of questions about prices and currency reform, and maintained a Central Bureau for Complaints, which during the early years of the New Economic Policy attempted to remedy complaints about tax miscalculations and to retroactively remedy abusive property seizures dating back to the tumultuous time of the civil war.

Historian Isaac Deutscher described Rabkrin as follows:

"The Rabkrin...was set up to control every branch of the administration, from top to bottom, with a view to eliminating the two major faults, inefficiency and corruption, which the Soviet civil service had inherited from its Tsarist predecessor. It was to act as the stern and enlightened auditor for the whole rickety and creaking governmental machine; to expose abuses of power and red tape; and to train an elite of reliable civil servants for every branch of the government. [Rabkrin] acted through teams of workers and peasants who were free at any time to enter the offices of any Commissariat and watch the work done there.... This system was devised as a method of training an elite for the civil service; but as a result of it the Rabkrin was able to keep its eye on every wheel of the governmental machine.

"The whole bizarre scheme of inspection was one of Lenin's pet ideas. Exasperated by the inefficiency and dishonesty of the civil service, he sought to remedy them by extreme and ruthless 'control from below'... The choice of Stalin for the job gives a measure fo Lenin's high confidence in him, for the Inspectorate was to be a sort of a super-government, itself free from every taint and blemish of officialdom."

Although Stalin's political opponents attempted to retroactively paint him with the black brush of Rabkin's failure, scholars believe that the Georgian's role overseeing Rabkrin in its stumbling early days was nominal, he being tied up from 1920 to 1922 with the affairs of the military, the People's Commissariat of Nationalities, and the activities of the Politburo. Effective control was exercised by Stalin's deputy, V.A. Avanesov, historians of Rabkrin indicate. The RKI was represented in a host of government bodies, including Sovnarkom, the Council of Labor and Defense (STO), and, through Stalin, in the Politburo and the Orgburo of the Communist Party. It received its instructions and assignments from party, government, and soviet agencies.

Working in conjunction with the Cheka and the People's Commissariat of Justice, the RKI was both a central conduit and influencer of party and state policy, able to supply information and recommendations on the one hand, while supervising policy implementation and providing feedback on the other. Only the secret police remained autonomous, answering only to the Politburo — Rabkrin held supervisory control over all other 17 commissariats, historian E.A. Rees has noted.

=== Rabkrin in the early 1920s ===
Although designed to oversee the state bureaucracy, Rabkrin rapidly developed into a bureaucracy in its own right. While the State Control agency of the tsarist regime in 1917 counted 3,000 employees, the Soviet People's Commissariat of State Control numbered 10,000 in 1920. In its reorganized form as Rabkrin, the agency grew further, with 12,000 employees on its payroll by 1922. In addition to the permanent professional staff, many of whom had worked in the RKI's tsarist predecessor, Rabkrin was supplemented with a number of volunteer staff. The proportion of members of the Communist Party was small during the early years of the agency, and with pay rates poor, the overall quality of personnel was low.

=== Lenin's criticism of Rabkrin ===
On December 12, 1922, Lenin suffered his second — serious — stroke which forced him to step aside from day-to-day activity. A period of introspection followed, during which he reviewed the Russian Revolution's results and prospects down to the current date. Chief among these was concern over the general disorder and disorganization of the state apparatus and a growing trend towards the centralized concentration of power, the growth of secrecy, and the decline of democracy within the Communist Party organization.

Lenin's "How We Should Reorganize Rabkrin," dated January 23, 1923, ran on the front page of the January 25 issue of Pravda as part of the discussion ahead of the 12th Party Congress.

Lenin dictated a "Letter to the Congress" that same month, with a view to moving the forthcoming 12th Congress of the RKP(b) towards a fundamental restructuring of its governing Central Committee and its relationship to the institutions of the Soviet state. Central to this change was to be an enlargement of the Central Committee from 47 members to 100, with the new members brought on board to be charged with improving the functioning of state institutions. This expansion would both help reverse the concentration of power in a few hands and improve the functioning of the state, Lenin believed.

Lenin further developed this plan with two letters to the 12th Congress. The first of these, "How We Should Reorganize Rabkrin," was published in Pravda on January 25, 1923. In this article, Lenin argued that the RKI was both useful and necessary, albeit — like virtually all other Soviet state institutions — "to a considerable extent a survival of the [pre-revolutionary] past" which had "undergone hardly any serious change." Lenin sought now to emulate the party's approach to the Red Army in the civil war by mobilizing "the best of our workers" to the task of supervision and control.

To this end, Lenin advocated that the 12th Congress should base its reform upon "some enlargement of our Central Control Commission," and amalgamating this body "with the main body of the reorganized Workers' and Peasants' Inspection." This enlarged CCC should then meet in joint plenary sessions of the Central Committee once every two months, making these gatherings into "a kind of supreme party conference."

Members of the expanded CCC–RKI, provisionally to number 75 to 100, were to be drawn from the ranks of the working class and the peasantry and were to undergo political screening by the Communist Party, as they would ultimately sit with the Central Committee on a basis of equality. Concurrently with this expansion of size and authority of the Central Committee and the Central Control Committee, Lenin declared that the size of Rabkrin should be "reduced to three or four hundred persons, specially screened for conscientiousness and knowledge of our state apparatus." A much smaller number of highly trained, well paid, reliable and dedicated experts were thus seen as superior to the burgeoning mass of semi-educated overseers. Beyond these, members of the working class and other class allies on the ground in the factories were envisioned as part of this general plan.

This was, it should be observed, no attack on Stalin — who had been succeeded as People's Commissar of Rabkrin already in May 1922. (Note: This was long a theme of Cold War era history, following Trotsky, which depicted Lenin's final articles as a broadside attack on Stalin rather than a last idealistic scheme for state reform. See, for one example, Robert C. Tucker, who sees "a barb aimed directly at Stalin" in Lenin's penultimate article, moving to a "transparent denunciation" in his final published piece, a "crushing commentary on Stalin in the guise of a further installment of Lenin's thoughts on how to reorganize Rabkrin." Tucker, Stalin as Revolutionary, p. 275. In light of decades of subsequent archival-based research, such a reading of the articles in question today seems tendentious.) Moreover, Lenin opined that the current People's Commissar, Alexander Tsiurupa, "as well as the whole collegium, can (and should) remain and guide" Rabkrin's work.

"I am sure that the reduction of the staff to the number I have indicated will greatly enhance the efficiency of the Workers' and Peasants' Inspection personnel and the quality of all its work, enabling the People's Commissar and the members of the collegium to concentrate their efforts entirely on organizing work and on systematically and steadily improving its efficiency, which is so absolutely essential...for our Soviet System," Lenin declared.

Lenin returned to the theme of CCC–Rabkrin amalgamation in his final published article, "Better Fewer, But Better," which was dated March 2, 1923 and published in the Pravda of March 4 — published just prior to his third and final, incapacitating stroke. In this Lenin again returned to the inefficiency and ineptitude of the state apparatus, which he characterized as "deplorable" and "wretched." Lenin lamented the low educational state of the working class, and the "ridiculously inadequate" level of the country's educational system — essential for establishing the Soviet economic and governmental system on a sound basis.

To address this deficiency until "good human material" could be trained up "in two or even three years," Lenin called for a focus on Rabkrin as the best hope as a stop-gap:

"We must make the Workers' and Peasants' Inspection a really exemplary institution, an instrument to improve our state apparatus.... For this purpose, we must utilize the very best of what there is in our social system, and utilize it with the greatest caution, thoughtfulness, and knowledge, to build up the new [combined] People's Commissariat. For this purpose, the best elements that we have in our social system — such as, first, the advanced workers, and, second, the really enlightened elements for whom we can vouch that they will no take the word for the deed, and will not utter a single word that goes against their conscience — should not shrink from admitting any difficulty... We have been bustling for five years trying to improve our state apparatus, but it has been mere bustle, which has proved useless...or even futile, or even harmful.

"It is high time things were changed."

Lenin declared that the RKI "does not enjoy at present the slightest authority," as perhaps the worst-organized Soviet institution. He went on to detail standards for the "irreproachable Communists" who were to be officials of the RKI, including multiple recommendations from established Communists, passage of tests proving understanding of the fundamentals and practice of management and office routine, and commitment to work in harmony with the Central Control Commission, joining the ostensibly state institution of the RKI with the party institution of the CCC.

=== Subordination to Central Control Commission ===
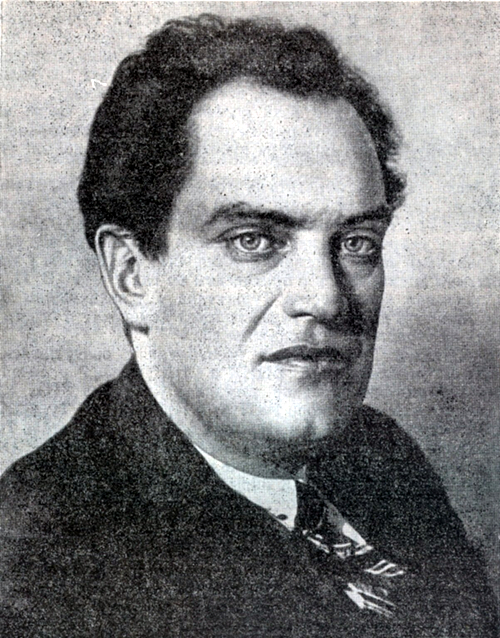
Valerian Kuibyshev, third People's Commissar of Rabkrin, holding the job from April 1923 to August 1926.

The April 1923 12th Party Congress did indeed subject Rabkrin to a radical reorganization, although not precisely in accordance with Lenin's pre-congress recommenations. First, the Central Control Commission (CCC) of the RKP(b), previously limited to 15 members, was expanded to a membership of 40, working under the authority of a 9-person presidium. The People's Commissar of Rabkrin was henceforth to be appointed by the party Central Committee, making its selection from the presidium of the CCC — effectively placing Rabkrin under CCC control. From this point the Central Control Committee and the Workers' and Peasants' Inspectorate was effectively a unified organization. Similarly the size of the Central Committee was increased to 40, of whom slightly fewer than half were "candidate" members with voice but not vote.

Moreover, historian E.A. Rees notes, "the radical essence of Lenin's scheme was emasculated" in the implementation of these changes. Instead of regular joint plenums of the full memberships of greatly enlarged Central Committees and Central Control Commissions to serve as mini party conferences, only members of the presidium of the CCC were to allow CC plenums, and these with voice but not vote. Moreover, the Central Committee was able to delegate any number of its members as representatives to the plenary sessions of the CCC, which were to be held every two months, "immediately prior to the Central Committee plenum." Three permanent members of the CCC presidium were granted seats at the table for meetings of the party's Politburo and Orgburo. (Note: The three members of the Central Control Commission presidium who attended meetings of the Politburo from 1923 were Valeian Kuibyshev, Emilian Yaroslavky, and Matvei Skiriatov. See: Rees, State Control in Soviet Russia, p. 75.)

The pyramid of power essentially remained intact in spite of the reform effort.

The CCC-RKI worked hand-in-glove with the secret police, the Joint State Political Directorate (OGPU), thereby empowered to use Rabkrin for direct supervision over all aspects of government and state industry. Additionally, members of the CCC were assigned to the governing collegia of other People's Commissariats, where they served a supervisory function. Decisive control by workers from the bench in such a system, one of Lenin's earnest desires, proved highly illusory under such a model, although the door was opened wide for informers.

Historian of the Soviet 1920s Roger Pethybridge summarized the situation in a 1990 book:

"The combined organ of Rabkrin and the Control Commission was a unique experiment that was dubious from the outset since it attempted to unite the masses with party and state administrators in one gigantic supervisory institution. Mass participation, including peasants as well as other groups, was never a reality after 1917... [A]ttempts to establish it in Rabkrin were a dead letter by 1922 already. Both organs were partially modelled on the workers' control movement of 1917 and the administrative methods of War Communism... Workers' control was both ephemeral and a failure, and War Communism methods were not supervisory checks, but brutal interference. The history of neither augured well."

New head of the All-Union CCC-RKI, Valerian Kuibyshev was quick to observe that Rabkrin, unable to serve as an effective universal auditor of the state's books, tended to settle for a vague and general oversight function, adding to bureaucratic muddle rather than isolating inefficiency and improving the productive process. As the 1920s proceeded, the joint CCC-RKI organization fell increasingly under centralized party control, becoming "a mere tool for political ends" in the hands of party General Secretary Joseph Stalin by 1926, in the view of Pethybridge.

=== Rabkrin during the 1920s ===
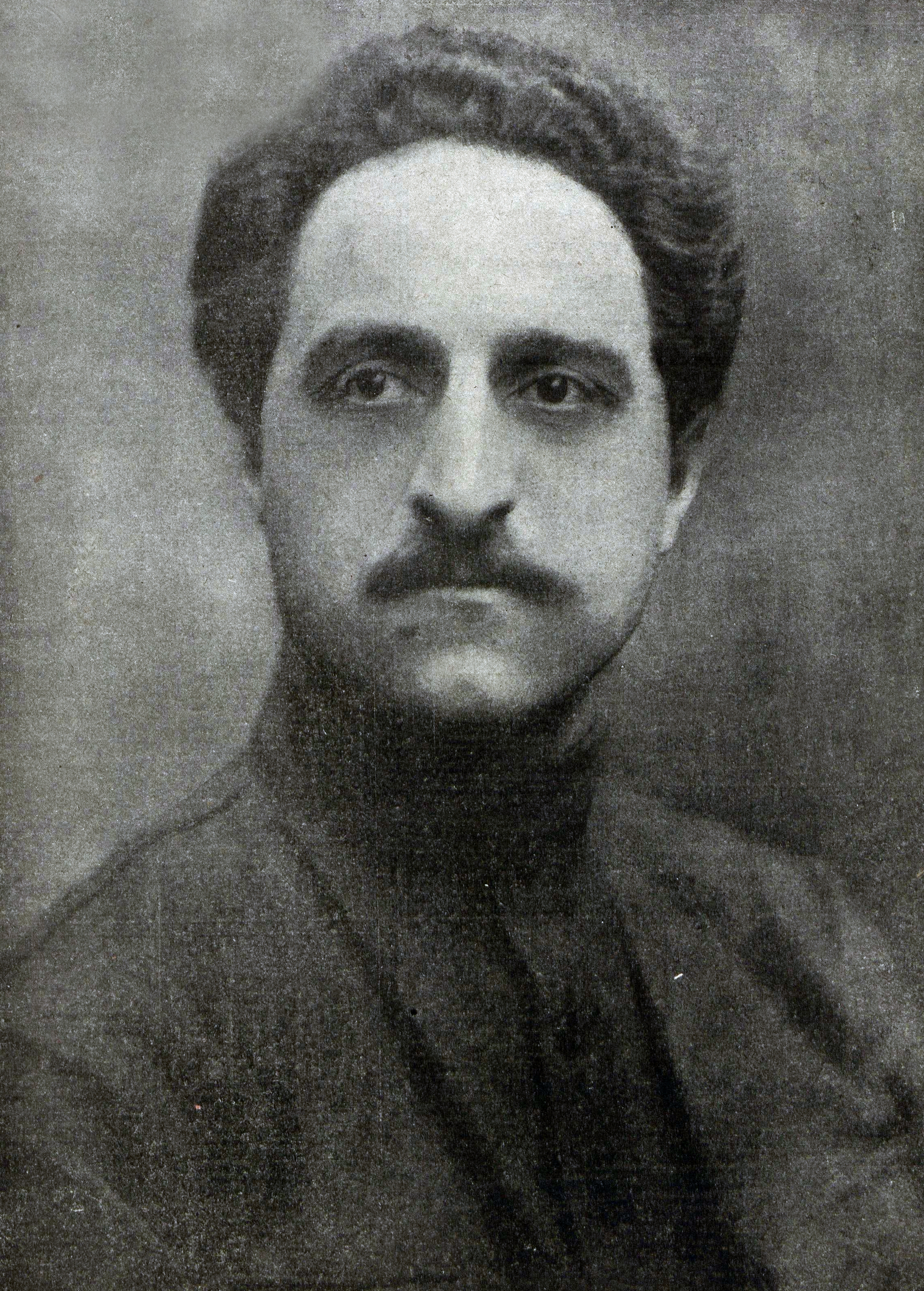
Sergo Ordzhonikidze, head of the All-Union Rabkrin for the second half of the 1920s.

This is not to say Rabkrin had no function in the rapidly evolving Soviet system of the 1920s. In 1925, wage standardization became an area of focus of the Soviet leadership. On January 2, Sovnarkom passed a resolution declaring it "indispensable to establish a uniform nomenclature" listing all positions and setting salaries for all departments of the government as well as other institutions that operated as part of the national or local government budget. Rabkrin was to be instrumental in this reorganization, working with the trade union central council to establish numbers of staff for each unit and then helping to set salary rates in conjunction with the People's Commissariat of Finance and the People's Commissariat of Labor. This new system was first made effective in Moscow in the fall of 1925 before being made national policy in September 1926.

Rabkrin continued to be a sprawling bureaucracy, with 27,432 functioning units in the fiscal year 1925–26, an excessive array which was pared down for reasons of economy by more than 22% in two years under People's Commissar Sergo Ordzhonikidze, a fellow Georgian and close associate of Stalin. Despite its own success in trimming its ranks in accord with the needs of the mixed economy under NEP, no such major success was attributable to its efforts, with the trade union movement particularly angered by outside attempts to reduce staff and boost average output.

Rabkrin's supervisory role over institutions and their official met with resistance. For example, in the late 1920s various officials of the People's Commissariat of Agriculture voiced complaints that the RKI held excessive powers, which it used abusively, disrupting effective operations.

Representaton of the Central Control Commission (and thus Rabkrin) increased at the end of 1927, when the 15th Party Congress increased CCC representation on the Politburo to four full voting members and four members with voice but not vote. This voting representation would ultimately prove crucial in defeating anti-mass collectivization moderates during the bitter policy fights of 1929.

=== Rabkrin and collectivization and the Five-year Plan ===
The grain crisis of 1927, with a poor harvest leading to inadequate cereal procurements, led to the Communist Party taking a more aggressive line toward the peasantry, culminating in the collectivization campaign of 1929—1930. Rabkrin came to play an important institutional role in this veritable civil war between town and country, firing an initial salvo in the fall of 1927 by compiling an "extremely ambitious" 10-year program to double grain yield in the USSR. (Note: According to R.W. Davies, an economic historian specializing in the Soviet 1930s, "no permanent increase in grain yields occurred in Stalin's lifetime." See: Davies, The Socialist Offensive, p. 38 fn. 104.)

In November 1928, Rabkrin was instructed to review the figures generated by the Central Statistical Administration (TsSU) with respect to the grain harvest and the demographic composition of the peasantry. The RKI accused the TsSU of having systematically exaggerated the output of the wealthy kulak strata and ignoring the importance of the landless poor peasantry in the harvest, conclusions lending support to the hard line favored by Stalin and his co-thinkers. As an English economic historian noted in 1932, a basic problem seems to have been bad information at the source:

"The area of land rented was increasing year by year. Much of this renting was concealed in order that taxation should be evaded; hence official statistics on the subject were meaningless. In some districts the system of landed proprietorship was reviving.... From 30 to 40 percent of all peasant households had no horses and no equipment. Whilst the rich hired cheaply the land and the labor of the poor, the poor hired dearly the horses and the equipment of the rich. Government grants of machinery and credits fell into the hands of the rich. Slavery and usury were widespread."

Rural policy was inflamed by Rabkrin's challenge of the figures and implicit conclusions of the Central Statistical Administration and the matter moved to the Secretariat of the Communist Party, (Note: The Secretariat was the small body responsible for day-to-day activities of the Communist Party.) dominated by General Secretary Stalin and his allies, for discussion and decision. With Rabkrin's aid, groundwork was being set for a mass collectivization campaign to forcefully remake the village.

Similarly, with the interrelated launch of the first Five-year plan (piatiletka), Rabkrin under Ordzhonikidze became a tool in the hands of Stalin's Secretariat as a radical challenger to the more staid assessments and policy recommendations of the People's Commissariat of Finance (Narkomfin) and People's Commissariat of Agriculture (Narkomzem). As historian R.W. Davies notes, Rabkrin "became increasingly important as policy-maker in agriculture, industry, and planning during the critical years of 1928 and 1929:

"Rabkrin, dominated by party members to a greater extent than any other Commissariat...was both an instrument of Stalin and his colleagues within the state administration and a means of concentrating the views and desires of the section of the party rank and file on which Stalin and his colleagues relied for support, and expressing them in specific proposals. Rabkrin consistently argued for more ambitious plans. The central staff of Rabkrin was joint with that of the party Central Control Commission, also headed by Ordzhonikidze, and responsible for the enforcement of party discipline; and in its exposures of the bourgeois specialists Rabkrin worked more and more closely with the investigating agencies of the OGPU."

This contributed to monolithic party control over the state apparatus, an accelerating trend in the late 1920s and 1930s. In short, by the time of the collectivization campaign of 1929–30, the "despised and ineffective" Rabkrin had evolved into "one of the most powerful institutions in the USSR, wielding enormous influence on policy-making," E.A. Rees argues.

=== Rabkin as omsbudsman ===
Throughout it all, Rabkrin continued to function in the role of formal ombudsman for the regime, continuing to receive letters of complaint from Soviet citizens who felt wronged by officialdom or seeking to expose acts of corruption or other malfeasance. In 1927, Rabkrin's central complaints bureau received 4,000 official complaints, a number expanding to 20,000 in 1928, and 43,000 in 1929, as the agency was bombarded with complaints from the peasantry over the brutal excesses of collectivization. The agency was said to be "bombarded" with complaints in the particularly violent year of 1930.

Speaking to a trade union conference in 1932, People's Commissar of the RKI Jan Rudzutak noted that Rabkrin had received "thousands of letters" complaining about the operations of the country's system of consumer cooperatives.

=== Termination ===
From November 1930 to October 1931, Andrei Andreyev headed Rabkrin. Like his predecessor, Ordzhonikidze, Andreyev pushed for greater industrial growth as well as military expansion.

At the 17th Congress of the All-Union Communist Party, with its purpose being felt to have been served in creating a more efficient administrative and economic structure, Rabkrin was dissolved, and its functions were passed to the People's Control Commission. After the People's Control Commission became responsible for productivity, an increase in labor unions became a support system for many Soviet citizens in the industrial areas, which led to less chaos caused by bureaucratic control.

=== Legacy ===
In the view of Isaac Deutscher:

"Lenin's cure proved as bad as the disease. The faults of the civil service, as Lenin himself frequently pointed out, reflected the country's appalling lack of education, its material and spiritual misery, which wcould be cured only gradually, over the lifetime of at least a generation.... With his characteristic belief in the inherent virtues of the working classes, Lenin appealed to the workers against his own bureaucracy. The mill of officialdom, however, turned the workers themselves into bureaucrats. The Commissariat of the Inspectorate, as Lenin was to discover later on, became an additional source of muddle, corruption, and bureaucratic intrigue. In the end it became an unofficial but meddlesome police in charge of the civil service."

== List of commissars ==
People's Commissars of the People's Commissariat of State Control of the RSFSR:

1. K. I. Lander (March 1918 – March 1919)
2. Joseph Stalin (March 1919 – February 1920)

People's Commissars of the Workers' and Peasants' Inspection of the RSFSR, 1920–23:

1. Joseph Stalin (February 24, 1920 – May 6, 1922)
2. Alexander Tsiurupa (May 6, 1922 – May 1923)

People's Commissars of the Workers' and Peasants' Inspection of the USSR and chairs of the CCC:

1. Valerian Kuybyshev (May – August 1926)
2. Sergo Ordzhonikidze (November 1926 – November 1930)
3. Andrei Andreyev (November 1930 – October 1931)
4. Jan Rudzutak (October 1931 – February 1934)

== See also ==
- People's Control Commission
- Five-year plans of the Soviet Union
