= Ukrainian Soviet Socialist Republic =

Soviet republic from 1919 to 1991

Ukrainian Soviet Socialist Republic (Note: Historical names: 1919–1936: Ukrainian Socialist Soviet Republic (Українська Соціалістична Радянська Республіка; Украинская Социалистическая Советская Республика)) Українська Радянська Соціалістична Республіка (Ukrainian) Украинская Советская Социалистическая Республика (Russian)
- 1919–1991 (Note: Occupied by Nazi Germany during World War II from August 1941–October 1944, it was Reichskommissariat Ukraine during the Nazi occupation.)
- Flag (1950–1991) State emblem (1949–1991)
- Motto: Пролетарі всіх країн, єднайтеся! (Ukrainian); Proletari vsikh krain, yednaitesia! (transliteration) "Workers of the world, unite!"
- Anthem: Державний гімн Української Радянської Соціалістичної Республіки (Ukrainian); Derzhavnyi himn Ukrainskoi Radianskoi Sotsialistychnoi Respubliky (transliteration) "State Anthem of the Ukrainian Soviet Socialist Republic" (1949–1991)
- Location of the Ukrainian SSR (red) within the Soviet Union (red and light yellow) between 1956 and 1991
- Status: 1919–1922: Nominally independent state (satellite state of the Russian SFSR); 1922–1990: Union Republic of the Soviet Union; 1990–1991: Union Republic with priority of the Ukrainian legislation
- Capital: Kharkov (1919–1934); Kiev (1934–1991)
- Largest city: Kiev
- Official languages: Russian; Ukrainian (Ukrainian declared as sole official language in 1990)
- Recognised languages: Belarusian, Crimean Tatar, Hungarian, Romanian, Polish
- Religion: Secular state (de jure); State atheism (de facto); Russian Orthodox Church (majority) (through Ukrainian Exarchate)
- Demonyms: Ukrainian, Soviet
- Government: 1919–1990: Unitary communist state 1990–1991: Unitary parliamentary republic
- First Secretary
  - 1918–1919 (first): Emanuel Kviring
  - 1990 (last) (Note: On 24 October 1990, article 6 on the monopoly of the Communist Party of Ukraine on power was excluded from the Constitution of the Ukrainian SSR): Stanislav Hurenko
- Head of state
  - 1919–1938 (first): Grigory Petrovsky
  - 1990–1991 (last): Leonid Kravchuk
- Head of government
  - 1918–1919 (first): Georgy Pyatakov
  - 1988–1991 (last): Vitold Fokin
- Legislature: Congress of Soviets (1919–1938); Supreme Soviet (1938–1991)
- History
  - Republic proclaimed: 10 March 1919
  - USSR created: 30 December 1922
  - Annexation of territories from Poland: 15 November 1939
  - Annexation of territories from Romania: 2 August 1940
  - Annexation of territories from Czechoslovakia: 29 June 1945
  - UN membership: 24 October 1945
  - Crimea transferred from the Russian SFSR: 19 February 1954
  - State sovereignty: 16 July 1990
  - Declaration of Ukrainian independence: 24 August 1991
  - Ukrainian independence referendum: 1 December 1991
  - Ukraine’s international recognition (dissolution of the Soviet Union): 26 December 1991

Area
  - Total: 603,700 km^{2} (233,100 sq mi)

Population
  - 1989 census: 51,706,746
  - 1990 estimate: 52,054,092
- GDP (PPP): 1990 estimate
  - Total: ~$395.12 billion
  - Per capita: ~$7,590.5
- GDP (nominal): 1990 estimate
  - Total: ~$81.4 billion
  - Per capita: ~$1,563.6
- HDI (1990): 0.750 high
- Currency: Soviet ruble (руб) (SUR)
- Internet TLD: .su
| Preceded by | Succeeded by |
| Ukrainian People's Republic | Ukraine |
- Today part of: Ukraine

The Ukrainian Soviet Socialist Republic, (Note: Ukrainian: Українська Радянська Соціалістична Республіка, romanized: Ukrainska Radianska Sotsialistychna Respublika; (Note: Ukrainian-language acronym: УРСР, URSR) Russian: Украинская Советская Социалистическая Республика, romanized: Ukrainskaya Sovetskaya Sotsialisticheskaya Respublika (Note: Russian-language acronym: Russian: УССР, romanized: USSR)) abbreviated as the Ukrainian SSR, UkrSSR, UkSSR and also known as Soviet Ukraine or just Ukraine, was one of the constituent republics of the Soviet Union from 1922 until 1991. Under the Soviet one-party model, the Ukrainian SSR was governed by the Communist Party of the Soviet Union through its republican branch, the Communist Party of Ukraine.

The first iterations of the Ukrainian SSR were established during the Russian Revolution, particularly after the Bolshevik Revolution. The outbreak of the Ukrainian–Soviet War in the former Russian Empire saw the Bolsheviks defeat the independent Ukrainian People's Republic, during the conflict against which they founded the Ukrainian People's Republic of Soviets, which was governed by the Russian Soviet Federative Socialist Republic (RSFSR), in December 1917; it was later succeeded by the Ukrainian Soviet Republic in 1918. Simultaneously with the Russian Civil War, the Ukrainian War of Independence was being fought among the different Ukrainian republics founded by Ukrainian nationalists, Ukrainian anarchists, and Ukrainian separatists – primarily against Soviet Russia and the Ukrainian SSR, with either help or opposition from neighbouring states. In 1922, it was one of four Soviet republics (with the Russian SFSR, the Byelorussian SSR, and the Transcaucasian SFSR) that signed the Treaty on the Creation of the Soviet Union. As a Soviet quasi-state, the Ukrainian SSR became a founding member of the United Nations in 1945 alongside the Byelorussian SSR, in spite of the fact that they were also legally represented by the Soviet Union in foreign affairs. Upon the dissolution of the Soviet Union in 1991, Ukraine declared independence and became the present-day independent state of Ukraine.

The republic's borders changed many times, with a general trend toward acquiring lands with ethnic Ukrainian population majority, and losing lands with other ethnic majorities. A significant portion of what is now western Ukraine was gained via the Soviet-German Molotov–Ribbentrop Pact, with the annexation of Eastern Galicia and Volhynia in 1939, significant portions of Romania in 1940, and Carpathian Ruthenia in Czechoslovakia in 1945. From the 1919 establishment of the Ukrainian SSR until 1934, the city of Kharkov served as its capital; however, the republic's seat of government was subsequently relocated in 1934 to the city of Kiev, the historic Ukrainian capital, and remained at Kiev for the remainder of its existence.

Geographically, the Ukrainian SSR was situated in Eastern Europe, to the north of the Black Sea, and was bordered by the Soviet republics of Moldavia (since 1940), Byelorussia, and Russia, and the countries of Romania, Hungary, Czechoslovakia, and Poland. The republic's border with Czechoslovakia formed the Soviet Union's westernmost border point. According to the 1989 Soviet census, the republic of Ukraine had a population of 51,706,746 (second after Russia).

== Name ==
The original names of the republic in 1919 were both Ukraine and Ukrainian Socialist Soviet Republic (Ukrainian: Українська Соціалістична Радянська Республіка, romanized: Ukrainska Sotsialistychna Radianska Respublika, abbreviated УСРР, USRR). After the ratification of the 1936 Soviet Constitution, full official names of all Soviet republics were changed, transposing the second (socialist) and third (sovietskaya in Russian or radianska in Ukrainian) words. In accordance, on 5 December 1936, the 8th Extraordinary Congress Soviets in Soviet Union changed the name of the republic to the Ukrainian Soviet Socialist Republic, which was ratified by the 14th Extraordinary Congress of Soviets in Ukrainian SSR on 31 January 1937.

== History ==
=== Establishment: 1917–1922 ===
==== Aftermath of the revolution ====
After the Russian Revolution of 1917, several factions sought to create an independent Ukrainian state, alternately cooperating and struggling against each other. Numerous more or less socialist-oriented factions participated in the formation of the Ukrainian People's Republic among which were Bolsheviks, Mensheviks, Socialists-Revolutionaries and many others. The most popular faction was initially the local Socialist Revolutionary Party that composed the local government together with Federalists and Mensheviks.

Following the abdication of Tsar Nicholas II during the February Revolution of 1917 in Petrograd, many people in Ukraine wished to establish an autonomous Ukrainian Republic. During a period of the Russian Civil War from 1917 to 1923, many factions claiming themselves governments of the newly born republic were formed, each with supporters and opponents. The two most prominent of them were an independent government in Kiev called the Ukrainian People's Republic (UNR) and a Soviet Russia-aligned government in Kharkov called the Ukrainian Soviet Republic (USR). The Kiev-based UNR was internationally recognized and supported by the Central Powers following the Treaty of Brest-Litovsk, whereas the Kharkov-based USR was solely supported by the Soviet Russian forces, while neither the UNR nor the USR were explicitly supported by the White Russian forces that remained, although there were attempts to establish cooperation during the closing stages of the war with the former.

==== Early Soviet governments ====
Immediately after the October Revolution in Petrograd, Bolsheviks instigated the Kiev Bolshevik Uprising to support the revolution and secure Kiev. Due to a lack of adequate support from the local population and governing anti-communist Central Rada, however, the Kiev Bolshevik group split. Most moved to Kharkov and received the support of the eastern Ukrainian cities and industrial centers. Later, this move was regarded as a mistake by some of the People's Commissars (Yevgenia Bosch). They issued an ultimatum to the Central Rada on 17 December to recognise the Soviet government of which the Rada was very critical. The Bolsheviks convened a separate congress and declared the first Soviet Republic of Ukraine on 24 December 1917 claiming the Central Rada and its supporters outlaws that need to be eradicated. The conflict between the two competing governments, known as the Ukrainian–Soviet War, was part of the ongoing Russian Civil War, as well as the Ukrainian War of Independence.

The government of the Ukrainian Soviet Republic was founded on 24–25 December 1917. In its publications, it named itself either the Republic of Soviets of Workers', Soldiers' and Peasants' Deputies or the Ukrainian People's Republic of Soviets. The 1917 republic was only recognised by another non-recognised country, the Russian Socialist Federative Soviet Republic. Warfare ensued against the Ukrainian People's Republic for the installation of the Soviet regime in the country, and with the direct support from Soviet Russia the Ukrainian National forces were practically overrun. The government of Ukraine appealed to foreign capitals, finding support in the face of the Central Powers as the others refused to recognise it. With the signing of the Brest-Litovsk Treaty by Russia, the Russian SFSR yielded all the captured Ukrainian territory as the Bolsheviks were forced out of Ukraine, and the Ukrainian People's Republic of Soviets was eventually dissolved.

In July 1918, the former members of the government formed the Communist Party (Bolsheviks) of Ukraine, the constituent assembly of which took place in Moscow. With the defeat of the Central Powers in World War I, the Bolsheviks resumed its hostilities towards the Ukrainian People's Republic fighting for Ukrainian independence and organised another Soviet Ukrainian government. The Provisional Workers' and Peasants' Government of Ukraine was created on November 28, 1918, in Kursk, with its initial seat being located in the city of Sudzha. On 10 March 1919, the Third All-Ukrainian Congress of Soviets ratified the Constitution of the Ukrainian Soviet Socialist Republic in Kharkiv. A group of three thousand workers were dispatched from Russia to take grain from local farms to feed Russian cities and were met with resistance. The Ukrainian language was also censured from administrative and educational use. Eventually fighting both White forces in the east and Ukrainian forces in the west, Lenin ordered the liquidation of the second Soviet Ukrainian government in August 1919.

==== Incorporation into the Soviet Union ====
Formally a sovereign republic until 1922, in view of some historians Soviet Ukraine de-facto came under control of Soviet Russia already in the course of the Civil War. In mid-1919, all republican organs responsible for the management of defence, economy, finance, transport and communications were subordinated to Russia's people's commissariats. After the creation of the Communist Party (Bolshevik) of Ukraine in Moscow, a third Ukrainian Soviet government was formed on 21 December 1919 that initiated new hostilities against Ukrainian nationalists as they lost their military support from the defeated Central Powers. Eventually, the Red Army ended up controlling much of the Ukrainian territory after the Polish-Soviet Peace of Riga. The war ended with the territory of pro-independence Ukrainian People's Republic being annexed into a new Ukrainian Socialist Soviet Republic, and western Ukraine being annexed into the Second Polish Republic.

In 1920–1921 Russia, Ukraine and several other Soviet republics officially established federative ties. In 1921 discussions emerged between two groups of the Bolshevik Party in relation to the nature of relations between Russia and other republics. One fraction, represented by Stalin, considered it necessary to incorporate the latter as federal subjects of Russia, meanwhile their opponents, led by Volodymyr Zatonsky, opposed Russian dominance and supported an equal federation. Meanwhile central Soviet ministries made attempts to establish direct control over enterprises in Ukraine, without consulting the republican government in Kharkiv, which led to protests from local authorities. Following Lenin's sickness, in 1922 Stalin proposed a project of the republics' incorporation into Soviet Russia on the rights of autonomies. However, Lenin opposed that idea, and promoted formal equality of republics including Russia, with simultaneous preservation of Moscow's central control. As a result, Soviet Russia's institutions attained the status of all-Union organs, achieving a higher status than organs of other republics.

On 30 December 1922, along with the Russian, Byelorussian and Transcaucasian republics, the Ukrainian SSR became one of the founding members of the Union of Soviet Socialist Republics (USSR). The 1924 Constitution of the Soviet Union formalized this act and declared the state to be based on the principles of dictatorship of the proletariat.

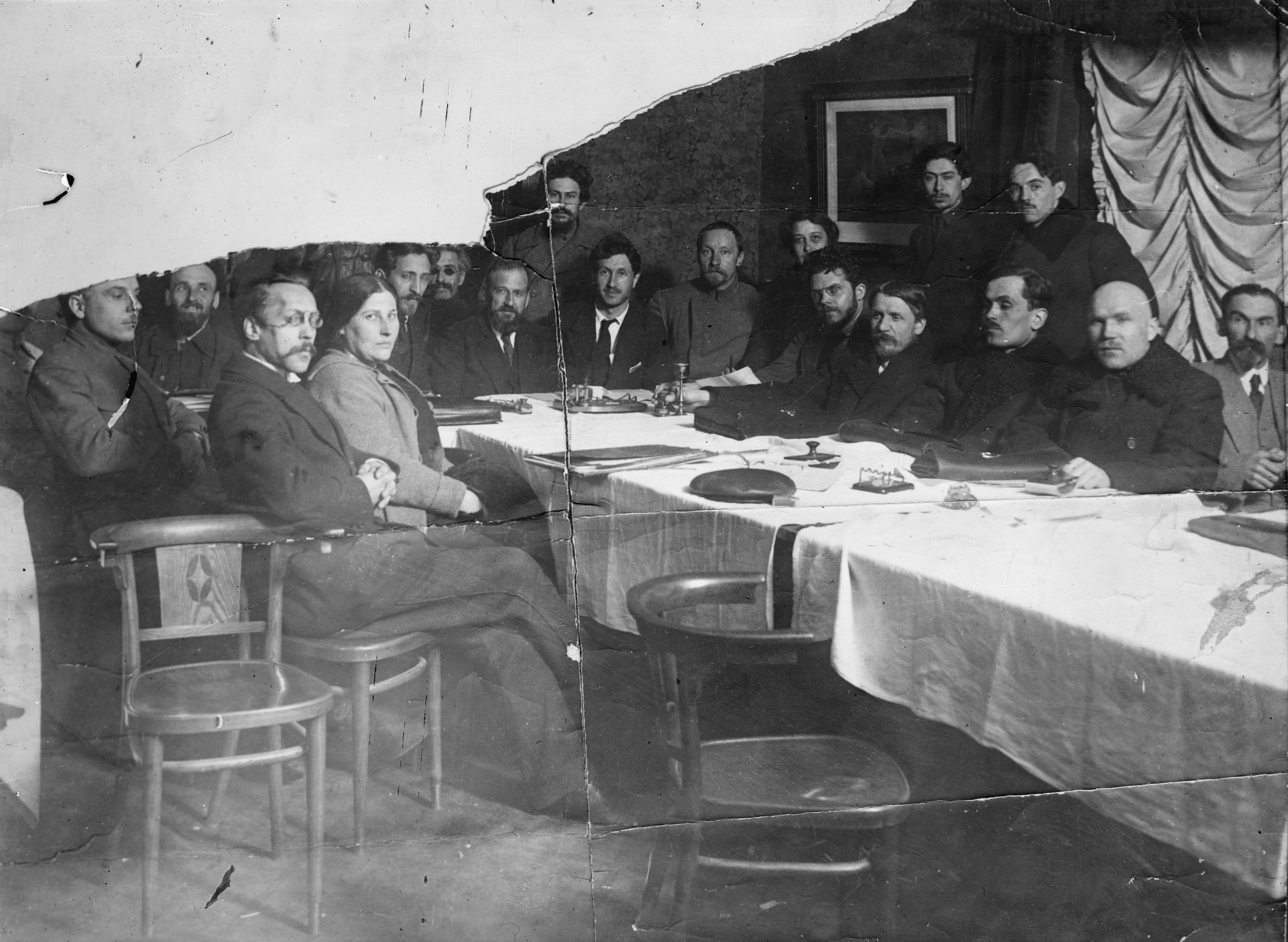
Bolshevik commissars in Ukraine (1919)

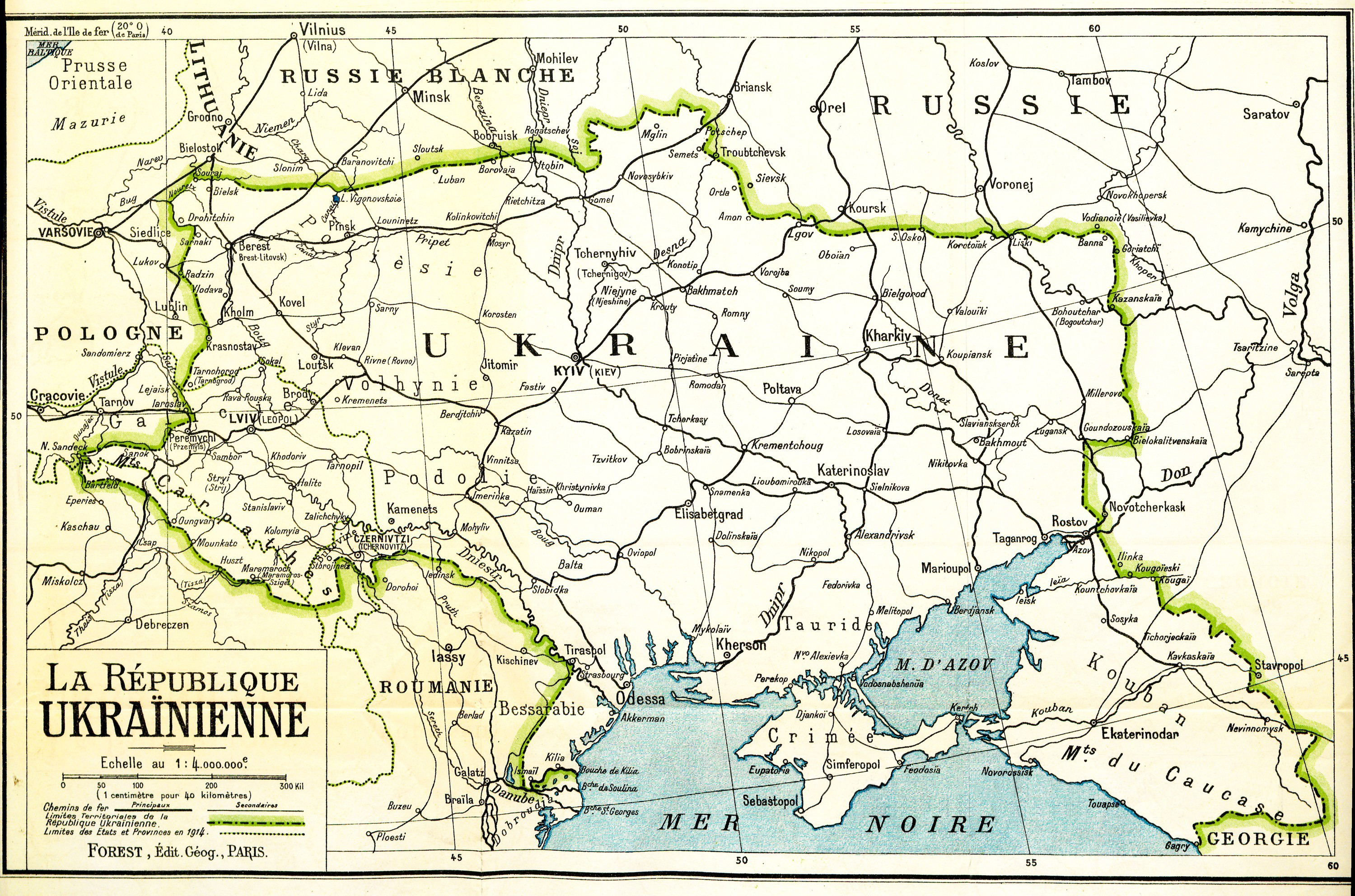
Territories claimed by the Ukrainian People's Republic (1917–1920)

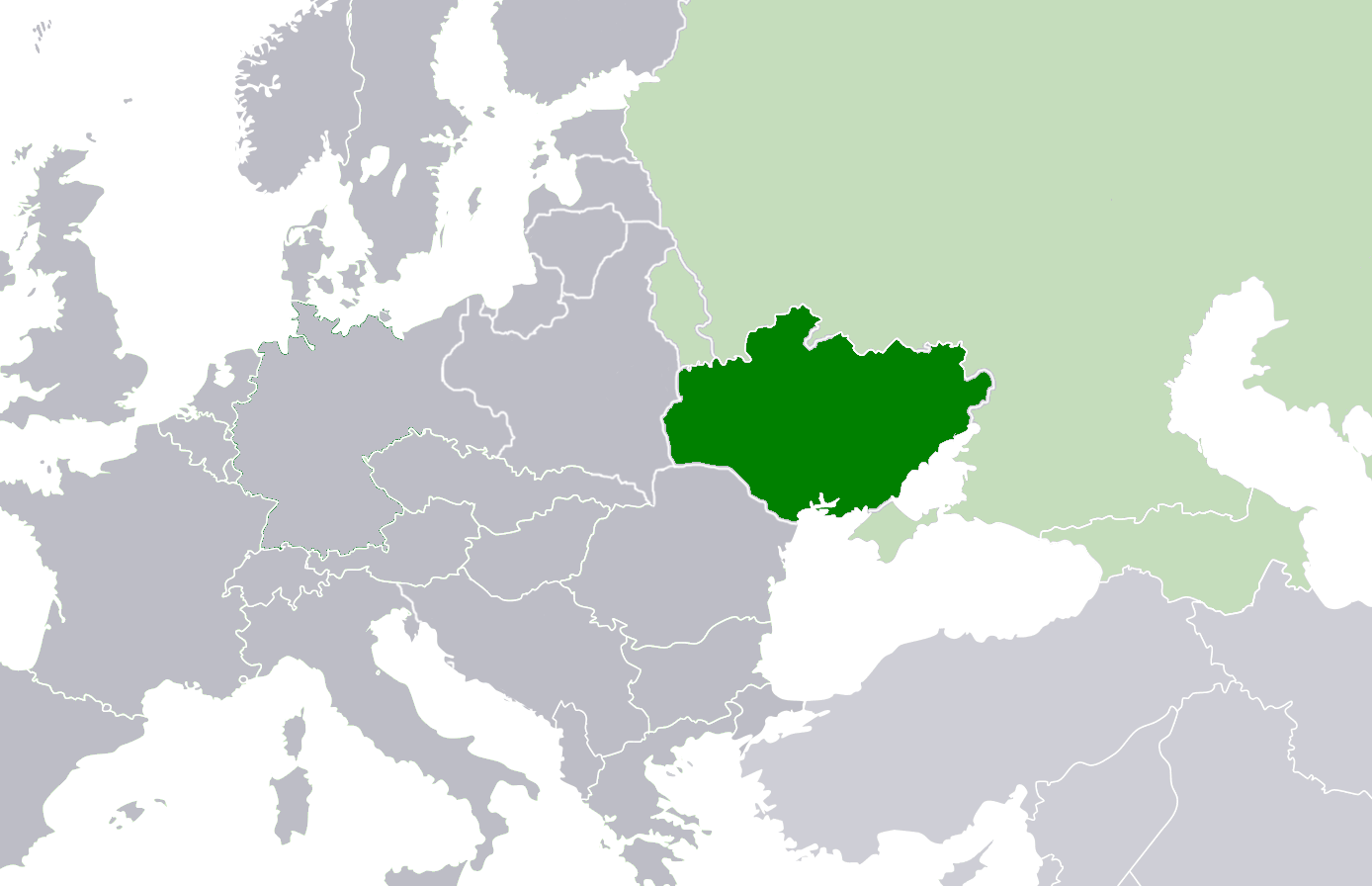
Boundaries of the Ukrainian SSR (1922)

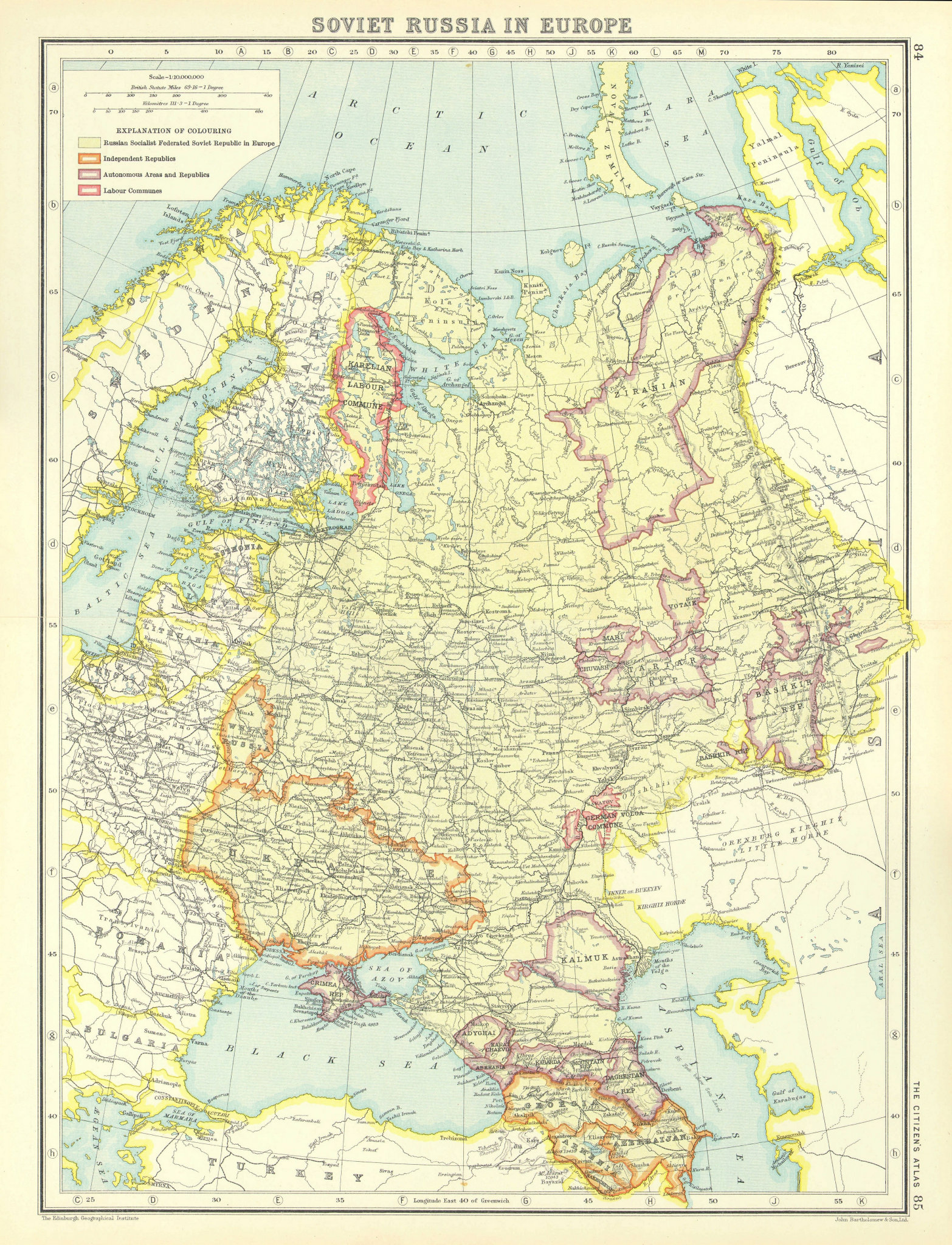
Soviet Russia and Soviet Ukraine in 1921

=== Interwar years: 1922–1939 ===
==== New Economic Policy ====
The policies of War Communism led to the devastation of Ukraine's economy and decline of agriculture, provoking numerous peasant uprisings against Bolshevik authorities, which had to be suppressed with the use of troops of the Red Army. The collapse in the agrarian sphere produced a detrimental effect on the whole economy, and by early 1921 only 4,060 of more than 10,000 industrial enterprises in Ukraine continued their operations. This, in its turn, contributed to the collapse of the transport system, with railways coming to a standstill. Even personnel of the Red Army stationed in Ukraine suffered from famine and lack of goods. In these circumstances, central authorities of the Bolshevik Party were forced to change their approach to the economy.

The discussions on the introduction of New Economic Policy (NEP), which started in Moscow cabinets during the early months of 1921, were initially met with skepticism by Ukrainian Communist leadership, which saw prodrazvyorstka as an essential component in the reconstruction of economy. After the 10th Congress of the Russian Communist Party (Bolsheviks), in May 1921 a council of Ukrainian party members in Kharkiv supported the transition to NEP despite some local opposition. A big role in that decision was played by massive peasant unrest. NEP didn't produce any significant changes in the Communist doctrine, but served as a tactical step in order to facilitate the exchange of goods between rural areas and the city. The introduction of the new system signified the failure of the Bolsheviks to rebuild agriculture according to Communist principles.

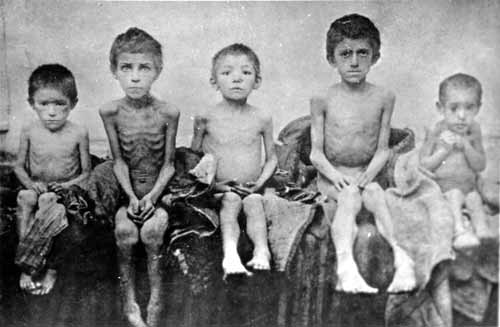
Starving children during the 1921-1923 famine in Ukraine

A severe drought hit Southern Ukraine throughout 1921, at the peak of the Soviet government's campaign of food requisitions from peasants. Unrealistic grain production quotas led to the refusal of peasants to give up their grain, as a result of which authorities answered with terror, including taking of hostages and mass shootings. Despite the visible food problems in Ukraine, the Bolsheviks refused to appeal for international help, concentrating their attention on the Volga region. As a result, a major famine engulfed Southern Ukraine and the Donbas, lasting until 1923. The lack of food resulted in a decline of insurgent activities against Soviet authorities, with some historians viewing the requisitions of food by the government as the first instance of terror through hunger in Ukraine.

==== Strengthening of Communist rule ====
In order to increase its influence in regions dominated by non-Russian ethnic groups, the Bolshevik Party leadership developed the program of korenizatsiya, which provided development of local languages and cultures with simultaneous preservation of centralized control. In Ukrainian SSR during the 1920s this process took the form of Ukrainization and involved promoting the use and the social status of the Ukrainian language and the elevation of ethnic Ukrainians to leadership positions. These policies provided Ukrainians an impression of national sovereignty, without abandoning the Communist Party's dictatorial rule. The "nationalization" of Soviet bureaucracy also contributed to an increased efficiency of management, strengthening the regime. At the same time, Soviet authorities clearly distinguished between "Communist" and "Petliurite" Ukrainization, seeing the latter as a threat to state unity. The campaign of Ukrainization aimed to prove the genuine character of Soviet rule in Ukraine and dispel the image of the regime as an alien occupying force. Its course was accelerated by power struggles in the Kremlin following the death of Lenin, which made it necessary for supreme party leadership to attain support of the Ukrainian society. At the same time, Russian preserved its role as the language of interethnic communication, with Russians remaining de-facto title nation of the Soviet Union. Ukrainization was halted in 1932-1933, when Stalin's regime proclaimed Ukrainian "bourgeois nationalism" to be the chief threat to Soviet unity.

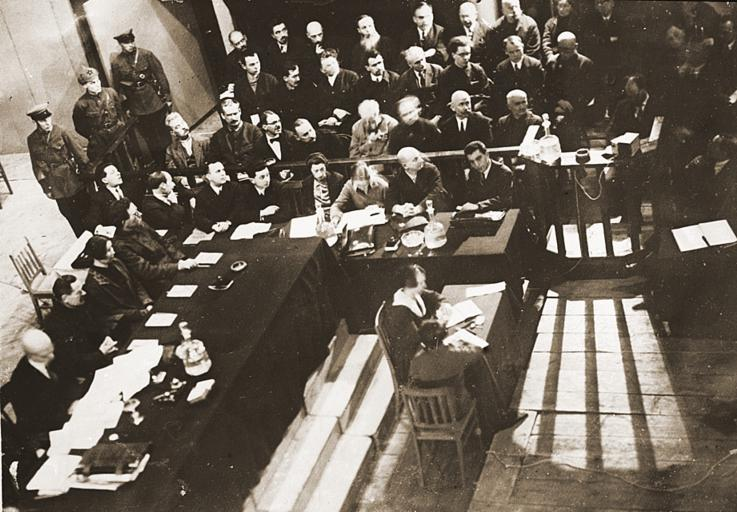
Trial of alleged members of the "Union for the Freedom of Ukraine" in Kharkiv, 1930

A major role in Soviet Ukraine's internal affairs during the 1920s was played by the Cheka secret police and its successor OGPU (GPU). Directly subordinated to the Central Committee, those organs functioned as a "state within a state" and were tasked with supporting the party's monopoly on all levels of government and economy. To eliminate opposition to the regime, the secret police employed methods of public terror through show trials, which were an annual occurrence in Ukraine during that period. Chekists were independent from local institutions of government and reported directly to Moscow, which allowed the central government to establish stricter control over affairs in the regions. The head of GPU's Ukrainian branch simultaneously served as the chief envoy of Russian GPU in Ukraine. The secret police also had its own military force, and its departments functioned in the Red Army and in transport enterprises. GPU regularly delivered reports to Ukrainian party leadership, informing them about popular attitudes to the Soviet regime and organizing fictitious "anti-Soviet" organizations in order to eliminate political opponents. One of the most prominent of such "organizations" was the "Union for the Freedom of Ukraine".

==== Collectivization and Holodomor ====
In 1929–1930 a new campaign of grain requisition from peasants was initiated as part of the Soviet regime's collectivization policies. Simultaneously, tens of thousands of Ukrainians were deported in course of dekulakization, causing serious damage to the agricultural workforce. The creation of collective farms led to the pauperization of Ukrainian peasantry and led to cases of armed resistance in various parts of the country. In December 1930 Central Committee of the Communist Party of Ukraine adopted a decision to introduce additional taxes and grain requisitions for those villagers who refused to collectivize. As a result, over 70% peasant households in Soviet Ukraine had entered collective farms by late 1932.

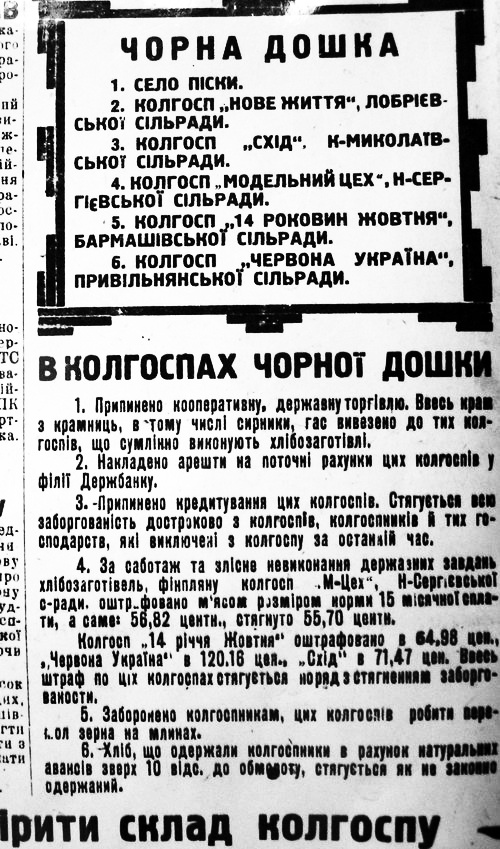
Names of "blacklisted" farms published in a local newspaper in Mykolaiv Oblast, 1933

The aggressive agricultural policies of Stalin's regime resulted in one of the largest national catastrophes in the modern history for the Ukrainian nation. A famine known as the Holodomor caused a direct loss of human life estimated between 2.6 million to 10 million. The famine was exacerbated by the fact, that grain storages in Soviet Ukraine were controlled by the Soviet Union's central authorities. In addition, transportation of private grain was outlawed, and peasants from famine-affected areas leaving Ukraine to buy goods in other regions of the USSR were turned back by guards. The Law of Spikelets, adopted by the Council of People's Commissars on 7 August 1932, introduced execution by firing squad for appropriation of collective farms' property, including grain from uncultivated fields. Along with mass requisitions of grain, the employment of such methods in Ukraine had a political nature, aiming to eliminate all resistance to the central government. Weakened by the campaign of dekulakization and confiscation of weapons by the Cheka, Ukrainian peasants were unable to effectively resist the regime's policies. The campaign of government terror against rural inhabitants relied on part of the local cadres, which received preferential treatment, including access to food supplies. The practice of blacklisting resulted in a blockade of numerous settlements, whose inhabitants were deprived of all food and died of starvation. According to a telegram sent by Stalin on 1 January 1933 to Ukrainian Communist leadership, all peasants suspected of hiding grain were to have their entire property, including food products, confiscated. Any mention of the famine was banned by Soviet authorities until the 1980s.

Some scholars and the World Congress of Free Ukrainians assert that the famine was an act of genocide. The International Commission of Inquiry Into the 1932–1933 Famine in Ukraine found no evidence that the famine was part of a preconceived plan to starve Ukrainians, and concluded in 1990 that the famine was caused by a combination of factors, including Soviet policies of compulsory grain requisitions, forced collectivization, dekulakization, and Russification. The General Assembly of the UN has stopped shy of recognizing the Holodomor as genocide, calling it a "great tragedy" as a compromise between tense positions of United Kingdom, United States, Russia, and Ukraine on the matter, while some nations went on to individually categorize it as genocide, including France, Germany, and the United States after the 2022 Russian invasion of Ukraine.

==== Stalinist terror ====
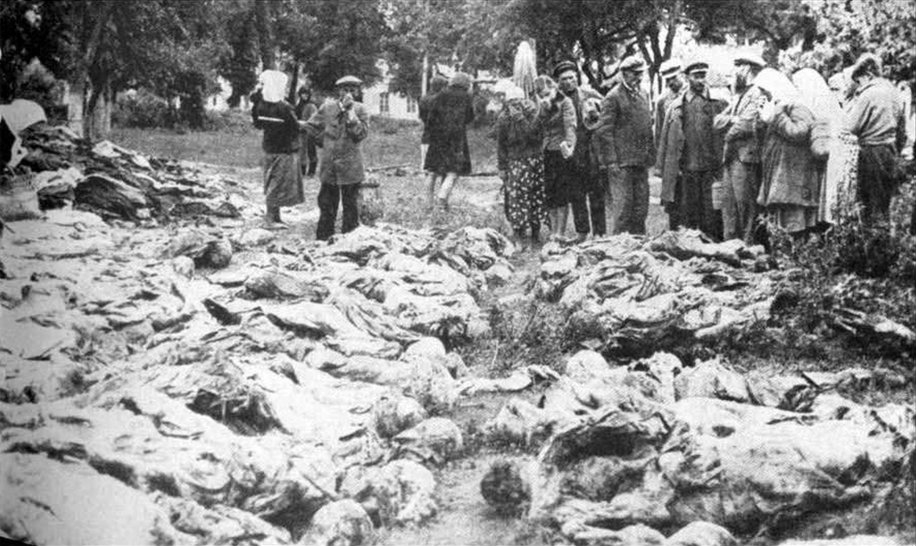
Bodies of the victims of Soviet terror in Vinnytsia after their exhumation in 1943

Beginning from the late 1920s, Stalin's dictatorial regime introduced a system of total and permanent terror against perceived "remnants of ruling classes", "counterrevolutionaries", "enemies of the people", "saboteurs", spies and even party members. Even supporters of the regime were persecuted for mere criticism of some of its practices. In order to physically liquidate potential dissenters, GPU and its successor NKVD was involved in creation of fictional "counterrevolutionary organizations", with people accused of participating in them being put on trial and executed.

Among the first groups to become victims of Stalinist terror were National Communists, followed by technical specialists and engineers (Shakhty Trial) and members of intelligentsia ("Union for the Freedom of Ukraine"). As a result of government persecution, several prominent Ukrainian Communists were driven to suicide, among them Mykola Khvylyovy, Mykola Skrypnyk and Panas Liubchenko. Millions of Ukrainians ended up in concentration camps, where they were used as cheap labour force, and hundreds of thousands became victims of mass executions, such as Vinnytsia massacre. Mass terror continued until 1938, reaching its peak during the tenure of Nikolay Yezhov. In Ukraine its main executors were security officers Martin Latsis and Vsevolod Balitsky, as well as party secretaries Pavel Postyshev and Nikita Khrushchev.

=== World War II: 1939–1945 ===
==== Annexation of Western Ukraine ====
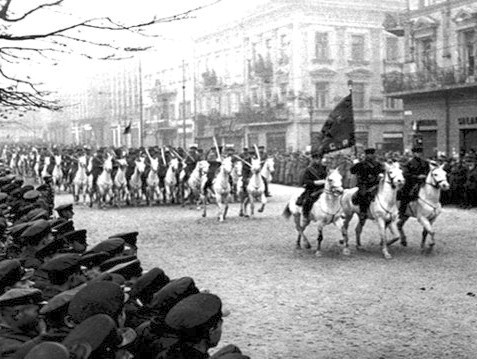
Soviet cavalry parade in Lviv following the city's surrender to the Red Army on 28 September 1939

In September 1939, following the signing of Molotov-Ribbentrop Pact, the Soviet Union invaded Poland. Official Soviet propaganda depicted the invasion as a "campaign of liberation" aimed to "free" ethnic Ukrainians and Belarusians from Polish rule. According to the Treaty on Friendship and Borders from 28 September 1939, Soviet Union and Nazi Germany partitioned the Polish state, as a result of which approximately 200,000 sq km of territory with a population of 12 million people was incorporated into the USSR. Following the campaign against Poland, as well as the subsequent Soviet annexation of Bessarabia and Northern Bukovina from Romania in 1940, newly incorporated territories were divided into oblasts, of which Volyn, Drohobych, Lviv, Rivne, Stanislaviv, Ternopil, Chernivtsi and Izmail oblasts were attached to the Ukrainian SSR. As a result, the republic increased its territory to 560,000 sq km, with its population reaching 41,657,000 inhabitants. Despite government propaganda, the attachment of Western Ukraine to the Soviet Union was seen by many Ukrainians not as a unification of their country, but as an illegitimate partition of Poland. The newly annexed territories underwent rapid Sovietization, with landowners' holdings being divided between peasants. Between February 1940 and June 1941 320,000 people were forcibly deported from Western Ukraine and Western Belarus. Polish prisoners of war were interned in special camps, and more than 14,000 of them were extrajudicially executed in Katyn, Kharkiv and Tver. The repressions by Stalinist regime had a preventive character, with all people potentially able to resist the regime being eliminated.

==== German–Soviet War ====
Immediately after the start of German-Soviet War in June 1941, Ukraine became a theatre of major battles between Wehrmacht and the Red Army. In the Battle of Brody mechanized units of the Soviet Southwestern Front suffered a crushing defeat from German forces. Stavka was reluctant to allow Red Army units an organized retreat, which led to their failure to organize defence on the "Stalin Line". By 10 July 1941, German forces found themselves on distant approaches to Kyiv. In August, German forces broke the Southern Front and encircled over 100,000 Red Army soldiers at Uman. Advancing from the Moscow direction, tank divisions of Guderian and Kleist on 15 September closed another ring of encirclement in the vicinity of Bakhmach, Lokhvytsia and Lubny. According to Soviet data, 453,000 Soviet soldiers and officers were captured by Germans in the area. On 18 September Red Army troops left Kyiv, but only a small number of them succeeded to break through German lines and reach Soviet positions. On 30 September Stavka ordered the withdrawal of troops located in Odesa defensive area to Crimea. By October, the Germans had captured Kharkiv and Stalino, advancing to Mariupol, Taganrog and Rostov.

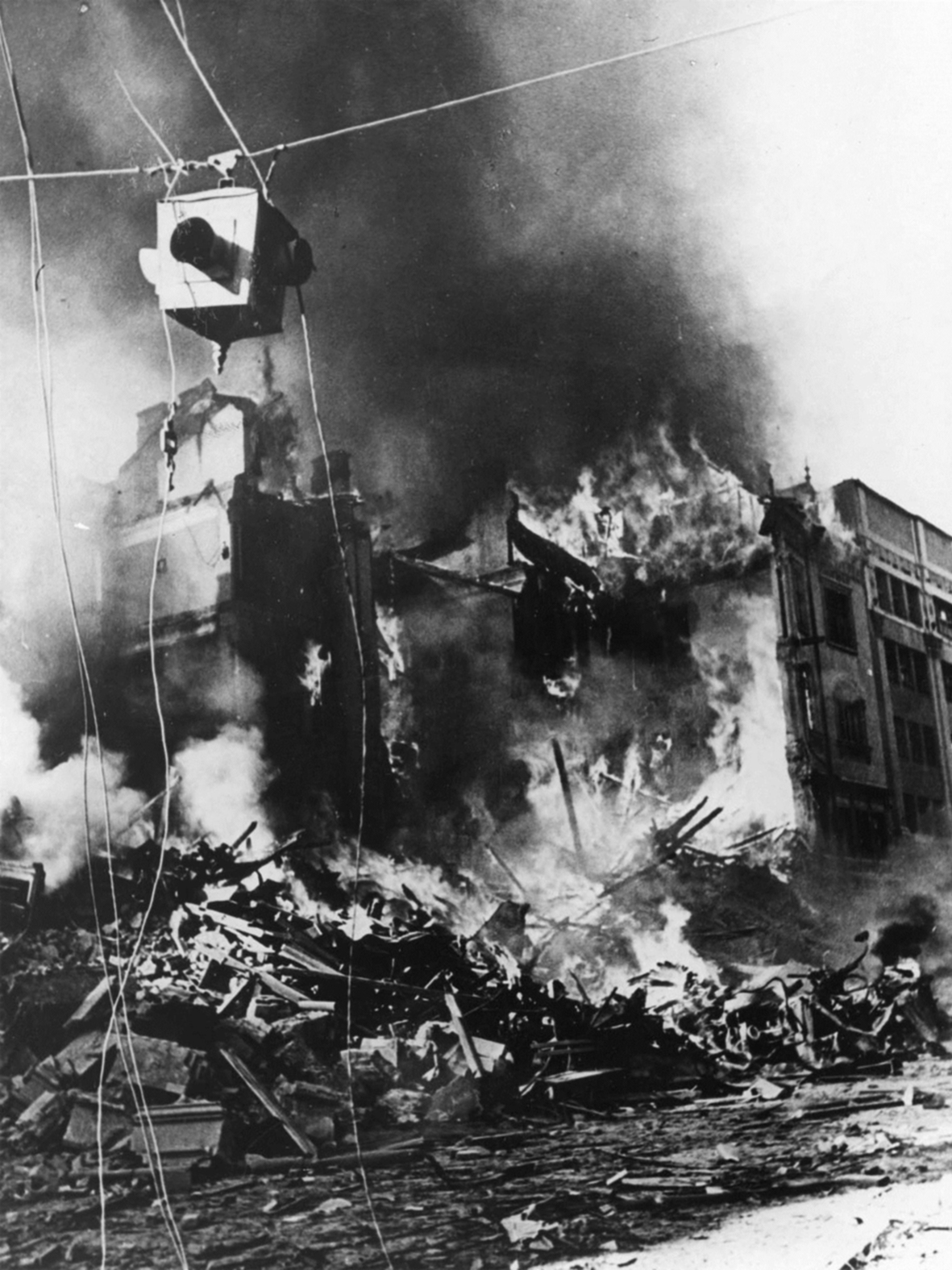
A fire on Khreshchatyk in Kyiv following the retreat of Soviet troops in September 1941

During the first months of 1942, Soviet forces engaged in fierce battles against Germans in the Donbas. However, a Red Army counteroffensive near Kharkiv ended in failure, leading to deaths of 171,000 Soviet troops and capture of another 240,000. In July German forces captured Sevastopol, eliminating all Soviet regular forces in Crimea. On 27 July 1942 last Soviet troops retreated from Shchotove in Luhansk Oblast, signifying the occupation of the whole territory of Soviet Ukraine by Nazi Germany. In the course of Soviet retreat, starting from June 1941 over 550 industrial enterprises and over 3,5 million workers were evacuated from Ukraine. All objects which couldn't be evacuated were to be destroyed as part of scorched earth tactics. Among structures demolished during the retreat were the Dnieper Hydroelectric Station, numerous coal mines and many streets in Kyiv, Kharkiv and other cities. The heavy damage to infrastructure produced by such policies exacerbated the state of civilians in occupied territories.

According to various data, between 2,4 and 3,4 million Red Army soldiers were captured by Germans during 1941 only. In Ukraine, most of local captives were released in order not to provoke resistance. However, in many cases captured soldiers would be shot by Germans due to lack of personnel which could be used for guarding them. Mass release of prisoners was stopped in November 1941. Nevertheless, mass surrender of Soviet troops continued well into 1942, demonstrating the lack of support for the Soviet regime, which many recognized to be responsible for deportations, famines and mass repressions. Captured soldiers were forced to live in terrible conditions, with millions of Red Army soldiers perishing in prisoner camps. According to statistics, up to two-thirds of Soviet prisoners of war captured in the Eastern Front had died by the end of 1944.

==== Nazi occupation ====
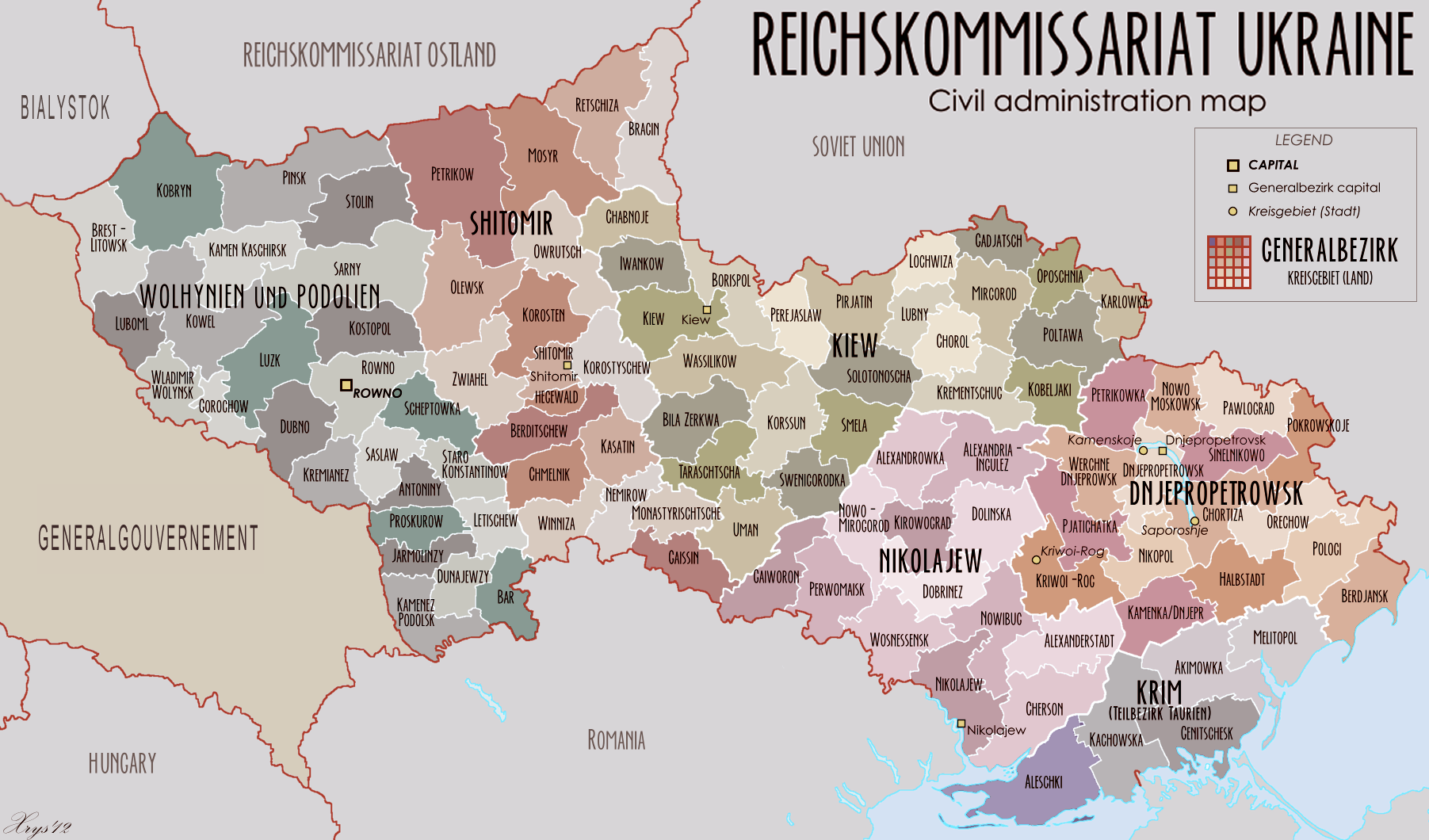
An administrative map of Reichskommissariat Ukraine as of September 1943

According to the plans of Hitler and his closest circle, occupied Ukraine was to become part of the Greater German Reich. After a treaty signed between Germany and the regime of Ion Antonescu, Odesa, southern parts of Vinnytsia and western part of Mykolaiv oblasts were unified into Transnistria Governorate, and along with Izmail and Chernivtsi oblasts attached to Romania. Lviv, Drohobych, Stanislaviv and Ternopil oblasts were incorporated into the General Governorate along with most occupied Poland, meanwhile Right-bank and most of Left-bank Ukraine along with a number of southern areas were put under the civil administration of Reichskommissariat Ukraine. Crimea and Eastern Ukraine remained under control of the German military administration.

In advance to the invasion, Hitler's regime organized four Einsatzgruppen tasked with eliminating "ideological and racial enemies" of the Reich. During the years of German occupation, 1,554,000 Jews were murdered in the modern-day borders of Ukraine. Just in two days in late September 1941, members of Einsatzgruppe C killed 34,000 Jews in the Babi Yar ravine near Kyiv. Orders issued by the Wehrmacht supreme command de-facto removed any responsibility for killing of civilians from German soldiers and offciers. In order to support the German war effort, over 2 million of Ukrainians were forcibly mobilized as Ostarbeiter and sent to Germany. About 450,000 of them died due to lack of food, hard work, poor medical care and allied bombings. Nazi plans for Ukraine included the removal of industrial equipment from the country and its transformation into an agricultural colony. The German administration refused to disband collective farms, and used their infrastructure for requisition of grain and other products. These policies led to a massive wave of hunger in German-occupied cities, forcing many urban inhabitants to sell their personal belongings in exchange for food. The Nazi Hunger Plan was aimed to eliminate Ukraine's population and replace it with German settlers as part of the Lebensraum project.

==== Liberation movements ====
Starting from mid-1942, Nazi policies led to a significant growth in the partisan movement in Ukrainian lands. Soviet partisan squads in Ukraine were subordinated to a central headquarters led by Tymofiy Strokach, and by 1942 numbered over 3,000 members. Their biggest detachments were led by Sydir Kovpak, Alexander Saburov and Oleksiy Fedorov. Partisans aided the actions of the Red Army by sabotaging German-controlled railways and bridges, destroying enemy bases and storage facilities. At the same time, members of partisan squads frequently engaged in maraudery against local civilians, causing their hostile attitude to the resistance. After the Lvov-Sandomierz Offensive in August 1944, most partisans in Ukraine became regular members of the Soviet Army.

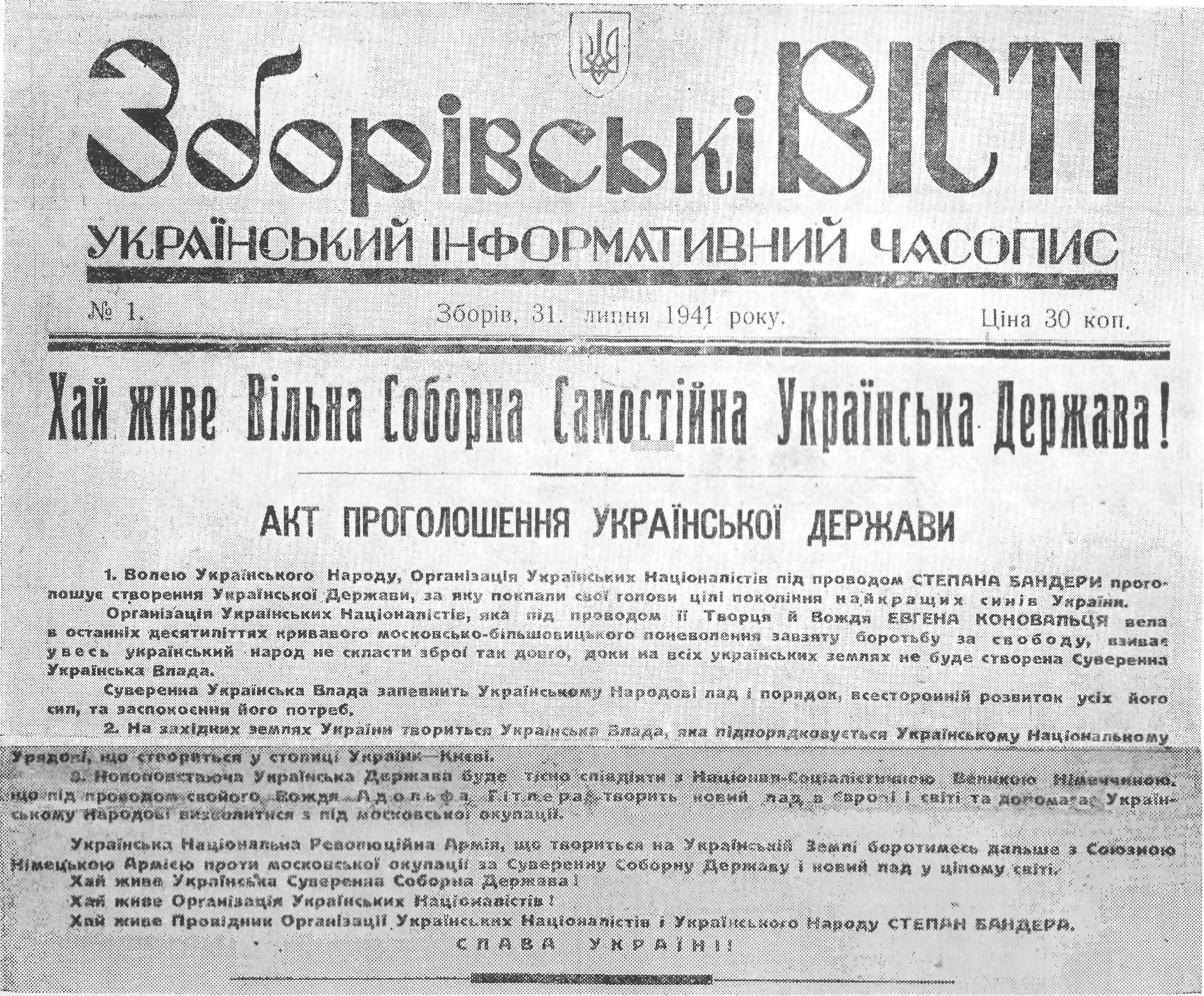
Text of the Act of restoration of the Ukrainian state

Simultaneously with Soviet partisans, Ukrainian nationalists also engaged in guerrilla activities in Ukraine during the Second World War. Between 1939 and 1941 the Organization of Ukrainian Nationalists (OUN) allied itself with Nazis due to their mutual hostility against Poland and the USSR. In April 1941, the OUN congress in Kraków signified a split in the movement, with the establishment of two separate organizations - the OUN-B led by Stepan Bandera and the OUN-M headed by Andriy Melnyk. Both groups created commissions tasked with establishment of institutions for a future sovereign Ukrainian state. OUN members were supported in their anti-Soviet actions by Abwehr leader Wilhelm Canaris, who allowed the creation of two Ukrainian nationalist battallions under code names Roland and Nachtigall. After the retreat of Soviet troops, the number of Bandera's armed supporters in western regions of Ukraine reached 12,000. On 29 June 1941 OUN members launched an uprising in Lviv, and after the entry of German troops on the next day OUN-B member Yaroslav Stetsko proclaimed the Act of restoration of the Ukrainian state. However, already on 15 July German police performed arrests of OUN-B members, with leaders of the organization being sent to Sachsenhausen concentration camp.

Starting from October 1942, Ukrainian nationalists initiated the formation of the Ukrainian Insurgent Army (UPA), whose units engaged in fighting against both German occupiers and Soviet partisans. In autumn 1943 UPA was formally subordinated to the Ukrainian Supreme Liberation Council dominated by members of OUN-B. Supporters of Melnyk refused to enter the organization. Blaming local Poles of collaboration with Nazis, in July 1943 UPA forces under command of Dmytro Klyachkivsky organized a campaign of ethnic cleansing against the Polish inhabitants in Volhynia. In November 1943 Klyachkivsky was removed from his post and replaced by Roman Shukhevych.

==== Soviet counteroffensive ====
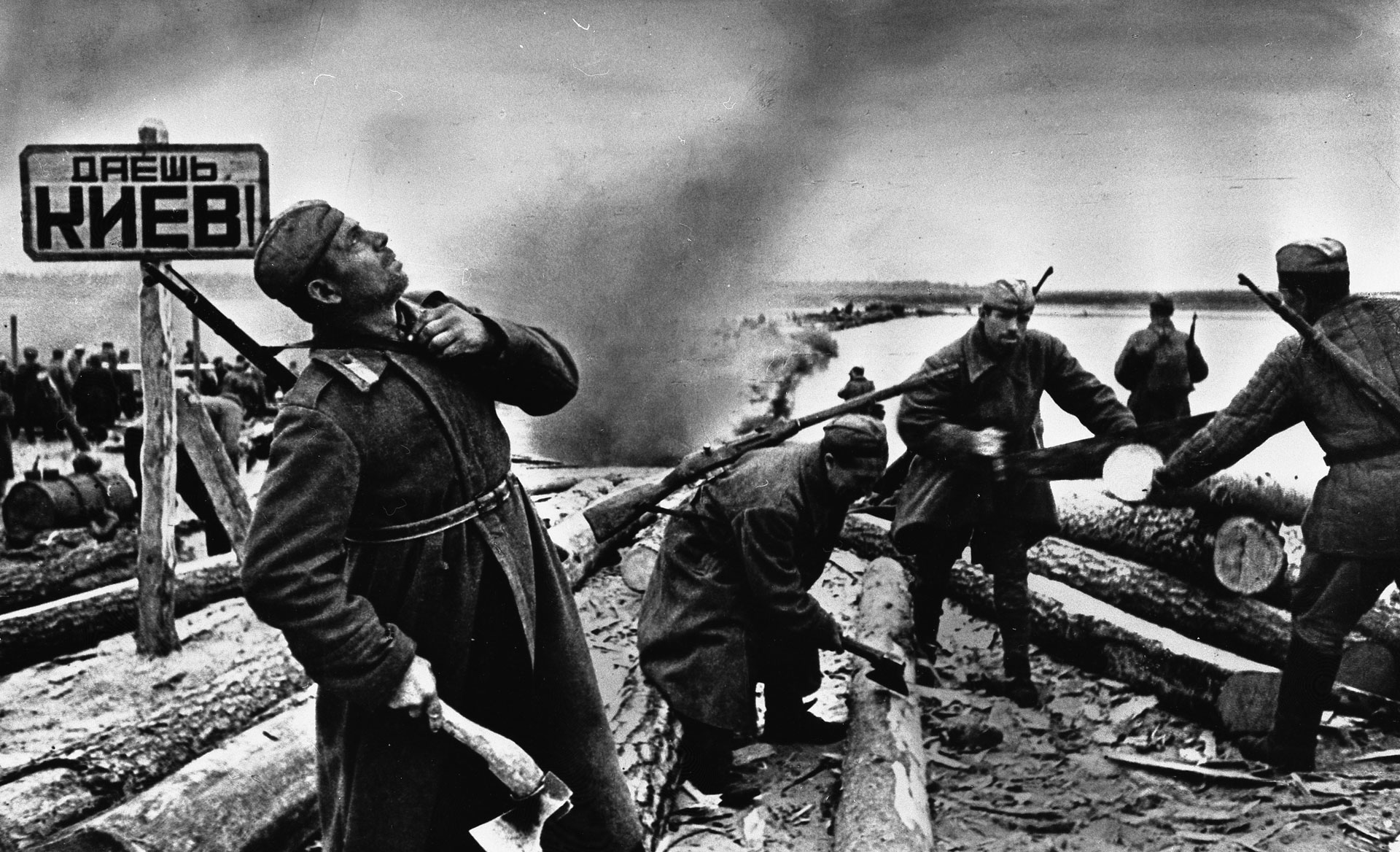
Soviet soldiers preparing rafts to cross the Dnieper during the Battle of the Dnieper (1943). The sign in Russian reads: "Let's get Kiev!"

Following the Battle of Stalingrad, between December 1942 and February 1943 Soviet forces expelled German troops from easternmost parts of Ukraine up to the Mius river. Following the Battle of Kursk, in Autumn 1943 Soviet armies advanced to the Dnieper, and on 6 November entered Kyiv. In the course of Korsun and Nikopol-Kryvyi Rih offensives, Soviet Union reestablished control over large parts of Right-bank Ukraine, and in March 1944 forces of the 1st Ukrainian Front took Vinnytsia, Proskuriv and Chernivtsi. In April armies of the 3rd Ukrainian Front took Odesa, and on 9 May units of the 4th Ukrainian Front entered Sevastopol, establishing control over Crimea. Following Operation Bagration, Soviet armies advanced through Western Ukraine into Poland, and by 28 October 1944 expelled German troops from Transcarpathia.

The return of Soviet authorities to Ukraine was accompanied with mass forced mobilization of locals, aimed to deprive Ukraianian nationalists of their pool for recruitment of new members. In order to combat nationalist guerrilla activities, Soviet NKVD organized special groups formed of captured UPA members, which were tasked with infiltrating the organization and eliminating its members. The Soviet regime also practiced collective punishment against family members of insurgents. According to official data, between 1944 and 1945 over 103,000 rebels were killed and over 110,000 captured. Over 30,000 people were deported from Western Ukraine to remote regions of the USSR for their cooperation with anti-Soviet resistance.

=== Post-war years: 1945–1953 ===
==== Aftermath of war ====
While World War II (called the Great Patriotic War by the Soviet government) did not end before May 1945, the Germans were driven out of Ukraine between February 1943 and October 1944. The first task of the Soviet authorities was to reestablish political control over the republic which had been entirely lost during the war. This was an immense task, considering the widespread human and material losses. During World War II the Soviet Union lost about 8.6 million combatants and about 18 million civilians, of these, 6.8 million were Ukrainian civilians and military personnel. Also, an estimated 3.9 million Ukrainians were evacuated to the Russian Soviet Federative Socialist Republic during the war, and 2.2 million Ukrainians were sent to forced labour camps by the Germans.

The material devastation was huge; Adolf Hitler's orders to create "a zone of annihilation" in 1943, coupled with the Soviet military's scorched-earth policy in 1941, meant Ukraine lay in ruins. These two policies led to the destruction of more than 28,000 villages and 714 cities and towns. 85 percent of Kyiv's city centre was destroyed, as was 70 percent of the city centre of the second-largest city in Ukraine, Kharkiv. Because of this, 19 million people were left homeless after the war. The republic's industrial base, as so much else, was destroyed. The Soviet government had managed to evacuate 544 industrial enterprises between July and November 1941, but the rapid German advance led to the destruction or the partial destruction of 16,150 enterprises. 27,910 collective farms, 1,300 machine tractor stations and 872 state farms were destroyed by the Germans.

==== Expansion and international recognition ====
The Curzon Line expanded the territory of the Ukrainian SSR to include western Ukraine, previously controlled by Poland.

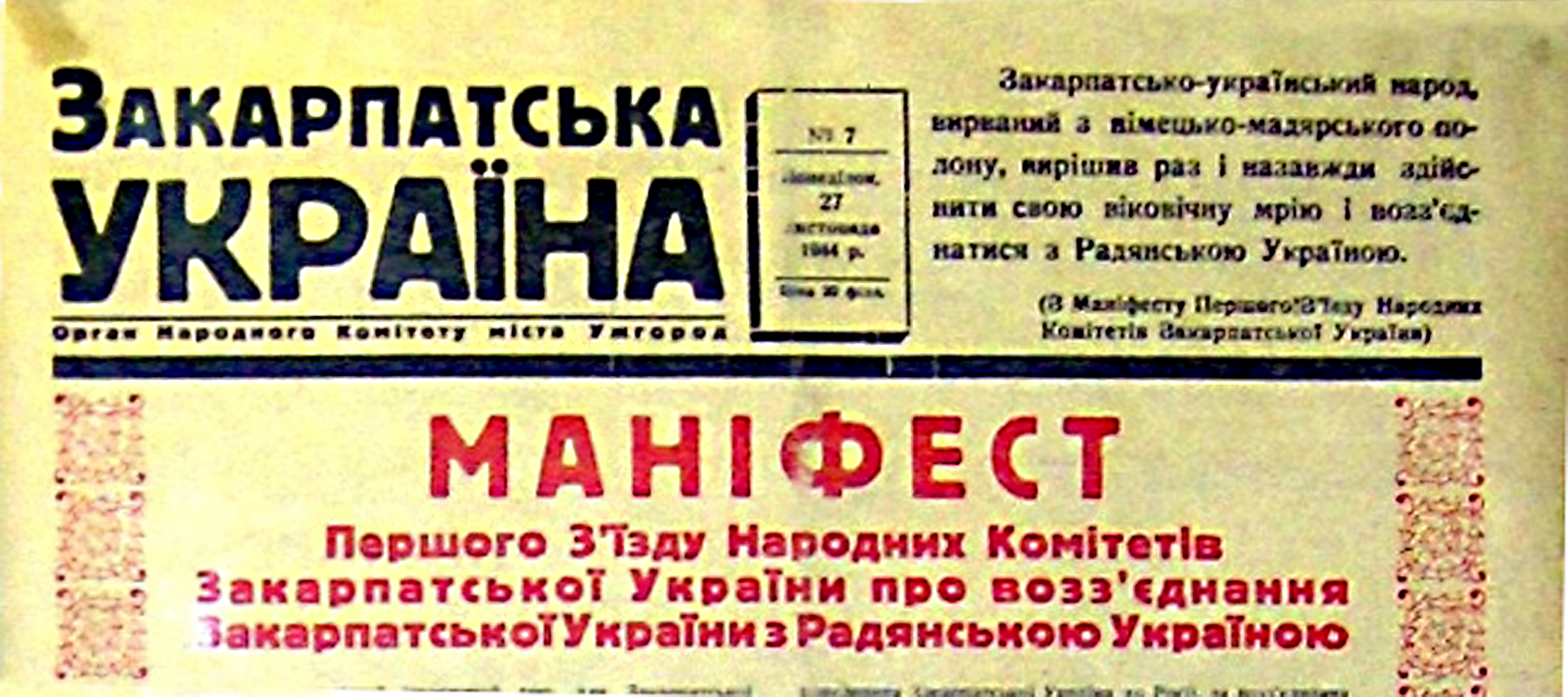
Front page of the Zakarpattia Ukraine newspaper (1944) with the manifest of unification with Soviet Ukraine

While the war brought to Ukraine an enormous physical destruction, victory also led to territorial expansion. As a victor, the Soviet Union gained new prestige and more land. During the Tehran Conference in 1943, British prime minister Winston Churchill negotiated a plan with Stalin, according to which lands of Poland populated by ethnic Ukrianians and Belarusians would be transferred to Soviet Ukraine and Soviet Belarus respectively, in exchange for which Poland would receive parts of German territory. The new Polish-Ukrainian border would generally follow the Curzon Line. Following the expulsion of Germans, between 1944 and 1946 Poland and Soviet Ukraine performed a population exchange, in course of which 810,400 Poles were resettled from Ukraine into Poland, and 482,900 Ukrainians had to leave Poland for Ukraine. Further 150,000 of Ukrainians would be deported from Polish territory during the Operation Vistula in 1947. A population exchange was also organized between Ukraine and Czechoslovakia.

On 26 November 1944, a council of people's committees in Transcarpathia adopted a resolution on the creation of a "People's Council" headed by Czechoslovak Communist Ivan Turyanytsia, and proclaimed the unification of the region with Soviet Ukraine. In May 1945 Avhustyn Voloshyn, the former president of Carpatho-Ukraine, was arrested by Soviet secret police, and on 29 June 1945 Czechoslovakia officially agreed to transfer Carpathian Ruthenia to the Ukrainian SSR. Ukraine was also expanded southwards, near the area Izmail, previously part of Romania. As a result, the territory of Ukraine expanded by 167,000 square kilometres (64,500 sq mi) and the republic increased its population by an estimated 11 million.

After World War II, amendments to the Constitution of the Ukrainian SSR were accepted, which allowed it to act as a separate subject of international law in some cases and to a certain extent, remaining a part of the Soviet Union at the same time. In particular, these amendments allowed the Ukrainian SSR to become one of the founding members of the United Nations (UN) together with the Soviet Union and the Byelorussian SSR. This was part of a deal with the United States to ensure a degree of balance in the General Assembly, which, the USSR opined, was unbalanced in favor of the Western Bloc. In its capacity as a member of the UN, the Ukrainian SSR was an elected member of the United Nations Security Council in 1948–1949 and 1984–1985. In 1954 Ukraine also became a member of UNESCO.

==== Soviet policies and resistance ====
Despite a severe drought in the country, in 1946 Soviet authorities refused to decrease the planned amounts of harvest in Ukraine, and signed agreements on grain exports to Poland, France, Bulgaria, Romania and Czechoslovakia in order to support the local Comunist movements. As a result, a new famine started in the Ukrainian province, leading to hundreds of thousands of deaths. Unlike in 1933, relief to the affected areas was provided both by the Soviet authorities and by the UNRRA. At the same time, in order to raise the productivity of agriculture, the Soviet central government adopted the Great Plan for the Transformation of Nature, introduced community trials for unproductive farmers and attempted to increase the size of collective farms. In 1955 the party leadership adopted a resolution, ordering local authorities to dispatch 30,000 young specialists for work in collective farms and sovkhozes. Starting from 1954, hundreds of thousands of agricultural workers were sent to the Kazakh SSR as part of Nikita Khrushchev's Virgin Lands campaign.

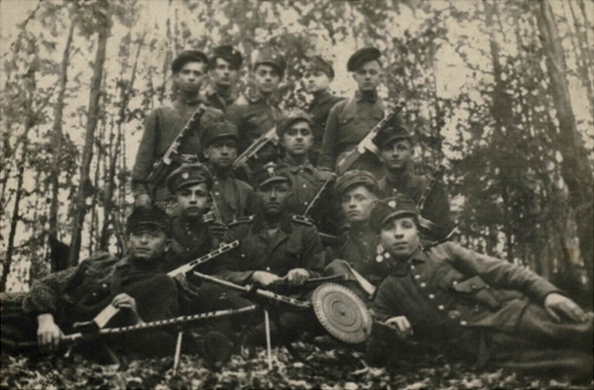
A group of UPA rebels during the late 1940s or early 1950s

Despite the Soviet occupation and incorporation of Western Ukraine during WW2, Anti-Soviet resistance by the Ukrainian Insurgent Army in the region continued for a decade after the war's end. In order to break the insurgency, Soviet authorities sent regular troops and NKVD formations in order to establish a blockade of rebel areas. Nevertheless, throughout 1946 OUN and UPA engaged in 1619 actions against the regime and its forces. By 1949, the base of insurgency had been significantly damaged as a result of special operations, deportations and collectivization, and UPA commander Roman Shukhevych ordered the incorporation of all rebel units into the structure of OUN-B. On 5 March 1950 Shukhevych was killed in battle in the village of Bilohorshcha near Lviv following a search operation led by Pavel Sudoplatov. During the next two years, MGB managed to eliminate several high-ranked rebels by infiltrating the underground organization. In May 1954 Vasyl Kuk, the last commander of UPA, was captured by Soviet authorities. After that, the nationalist insurgency gradually ceased, although minor operations against the rebels continued until 1960.

=== Khrushchev and Brezhnev: 1953–1982 ===
==== Khrushchev Thaw ====
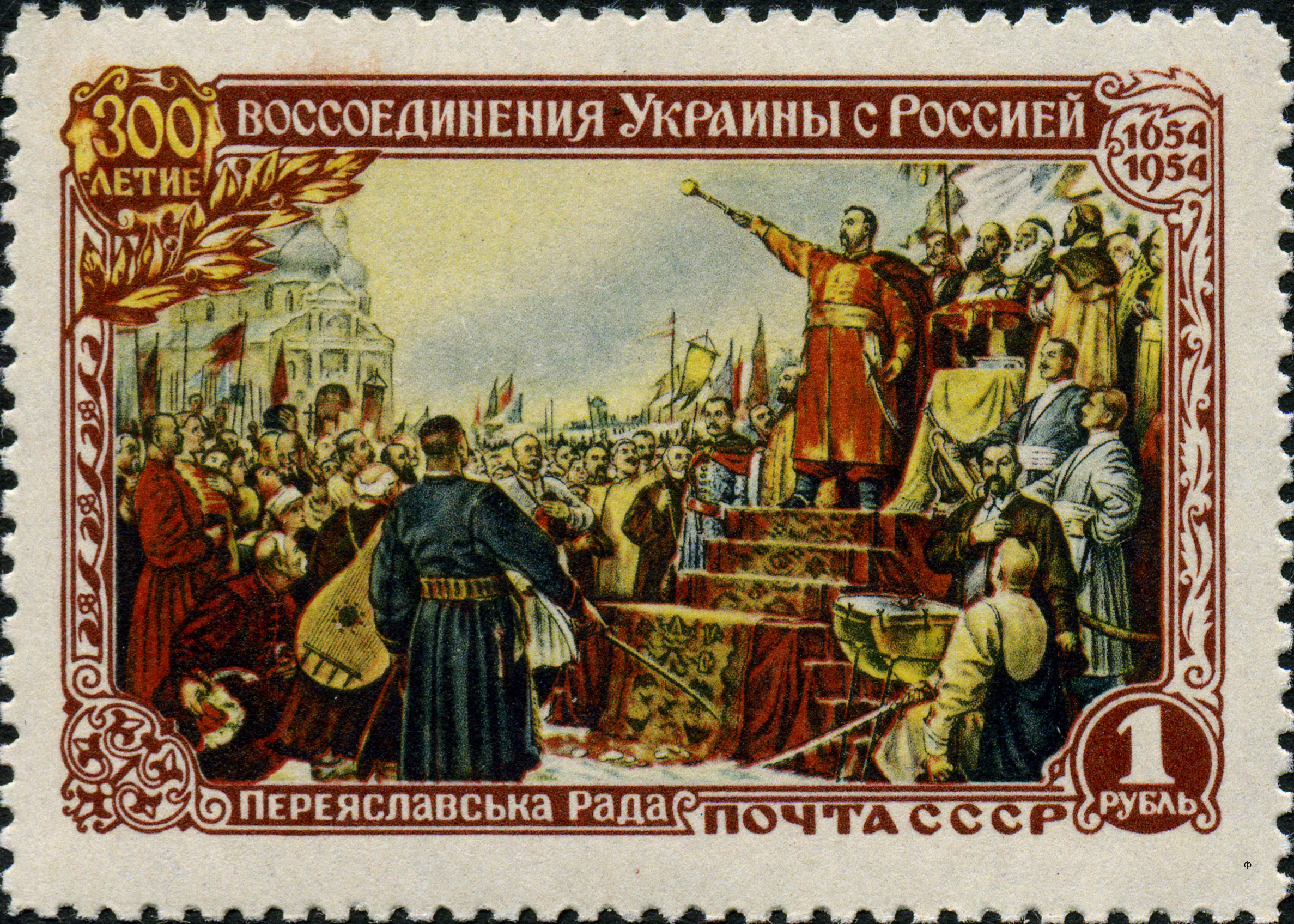
Soviet postal stamp, 1954, in honour of the 300th anniversary of Ukraine re-unification with Russia (Soviet name for the Pereiaslav Agreement), Russian: 300-летие Воссоединения Украины с Россией).

When Stalin died on 5 March 1953, the collective leadership of Khrushchev, Georgy Malenkov, Vyacheslav Molotov and Lavrentiy Beria took power and a period of de-Stalinization began. Change came as early as 1953, when officials were allowed to criticise Stalin's policy of russification. The Central Committee of the Communist Party of Ukraine (CPU) openly criticised Stalin's russification policies in a meeting in June 1953. On 4 June 1953, Aleksey Kirichenko succeeded Leonid Melnikov as First Secretary of the CPU; this was significant since Kirichenko was the first ethnic Ukrainian to lead the CPU since the 1920s. The policy of de-Stalinization took two main features, that of centralisation and decentralisation from the centre. In February 1954, the Russian Soviet Federative Socialist Republic (RSFSR) transferred Crimea to Ukraine during the celebrations of the 300th anniversary of Ukraine's reunification with Russia, Soviet term for the Pereiaslav Agreement (Ukrainian: Переяславська рада), a treaty which brought Ukraine under Russian rule three centuries before. The massive festivities lasted throughout 1954, aiming to prove the old and brotherly love between Ukrainians and Russians, and depict the Soviet Union as a "family of nations"; it was also a way of legitimising Marxism–Leninism.

The "Thaw" – the policy of deliberate liberalisation – was characterised by four points: amnesty for some convicted of state crime during the war or the immediate post-war years; amnesties for one-third of those convicted of state crime during Stalin's rule; the establishment of the first Ukrainian mission to the United Nations in 1958; and the steady increase of Ukrainians in the rank of the CPU and government of the Ukrainian SSR. Not only were the majority of CPU Central Committee and Politburo members ethnic Ukrainians, three-quarters of the highest ranking party and state officials were ethnic Ukrainians too. The policy of partial Ukrainisation also led to a cultural thaw within Ukraine. Late 1950s saw the emergence of Ukraine's dissident movement. In 1958 Levko Lukianenko established the underground "Ukrainian Workers' and Peasants' Union", whose members were arrested three years later and sentenced to long terms of imprisonment. The process against the organization was publicized in foreign media through the efforts of Ivan Svitlychnyi.

==== Brezhnev era ====
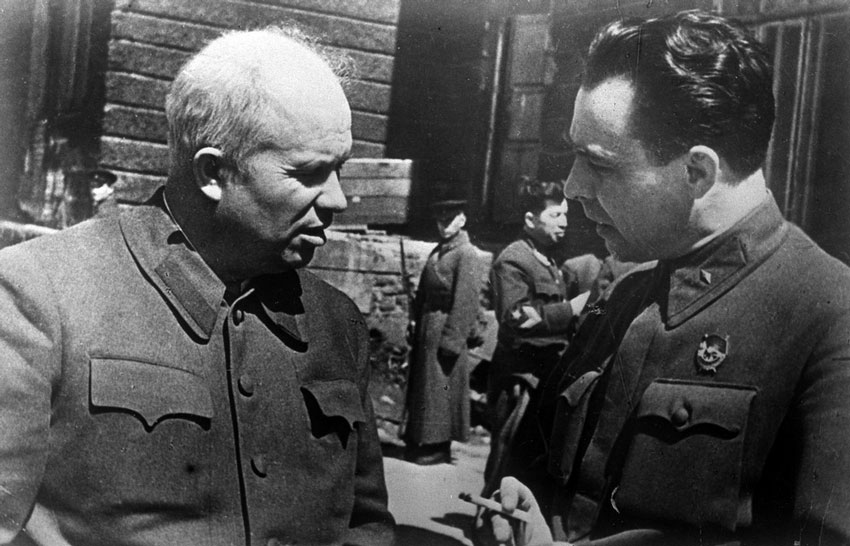
Two Soviet general secretaries were either born or raised in Ukraine: Nikita Khrushchev and Leonid Brezhnev (depicted here together).

In October 1964, Khrushchev was deposed by a joint Central Committee and Politburo plenum and succeeded by another collective leadership, this time led by Leonid Brezhnev, born in Ukraine, as First Secretary and Alexei Kosygin as Chairman of the Council of Ministers. Brezhnev's rule would be marked by social and economic stagnation. The new regime introduced the policy of rastsvet, sblizhenie and sliianie ("flowering", "drawing together" and "merging"/"fusion"), which was the policy of uniting the different Soviet nationalities into one Soviet nationality by merging the best elements of each nationality into the new one. This policy turned out to be, in fact, the reintroduction of the Russification. Brezhnev's tenure saw the gradual elimination of previously established distinctions between party oligarchy and the nomenklatura. During its later years, the regime established by Brezhnev and his circle of aging Communist party officials was frequently described as a gerontocracy.

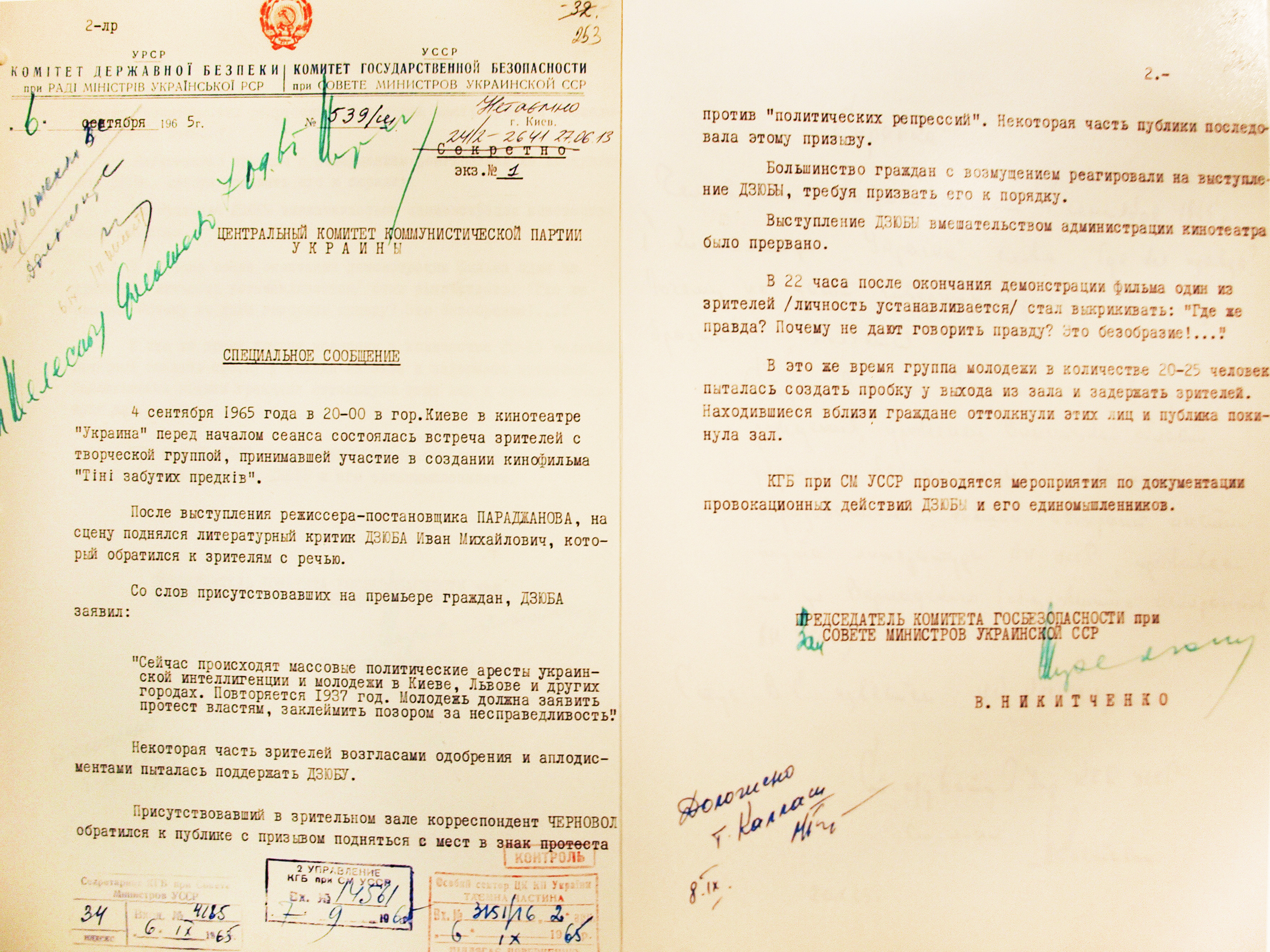
A KGB report from 8 September 1965 concerning the protest organized by Dziuba and Chornovil

Brezhnev's ascent to leadership was widely seen as a sign of restoration of Stalinist practices in Soviet politics, and produced hostile attitudes among Ukrainian intelligentsia. In order to suppress the opposition, in September 1965 First Secretary of the Communist Party of Ukraine Petro Shelest ordered the KGB to perform a series of arrests against prominent dissdents. During the operation, numerous copies of samizdat literature were confiscated. After learning about the arrests, Ivan Dziuba and Viacheslav Chornovil organized Ukraine's first public protest in decades, which took place during the screening of Sergei Parajanov's film Shadows of Forgotten Ancestors in Kyiv's Ukraina cinema. In 1968 Dziuba's pamphlet Internationalism or Russification?, protesting against Russian chauvinism, was published by Suchasnist publishing house in Munich, spreading awareness about Ukrainian intellectual resistance both in Ukraine and abroad. Both Dziuba and Chornovil never hid their dissident views, but instead openly contacted Soviet Ukraine's governing circles, demanding political change. After spending three years in imprisonment for his activities, in 1970 Chornovil started publishing The Ukrainian Herald, which chronicled government repressions against Ukrainian activists.

In January 1972 a new massive campaign against Ukrainian dissidents was started by authorities, producing significant damage to the opposition movement. However, following the Helsinki Accords of 1975, a new wave of dissident activities started in form of the Human rights movement. In November 1976 the Ukrainian Helsinki Group was established in Kyiv by Mykola Rudenko, Oles Berdnyk, Petro Hryhorenko, Ivan Kandyba, Levko Lukianenko and several other activists. Soviet authorities started an immediate crackdown on the group, and in the following years many of its members were arrested, while others, such as Hryhorenko and Leonid Plyushch, were forced to emigrate and continued the organization's activities abroad. Several political prisoners, including Oleksa Tykhy, Yuriy Lytvyn and Vasyl Stus, died in imprisonment.

=== Gorbachev to independence: 1985–1991 ===
==== Liberalization ====
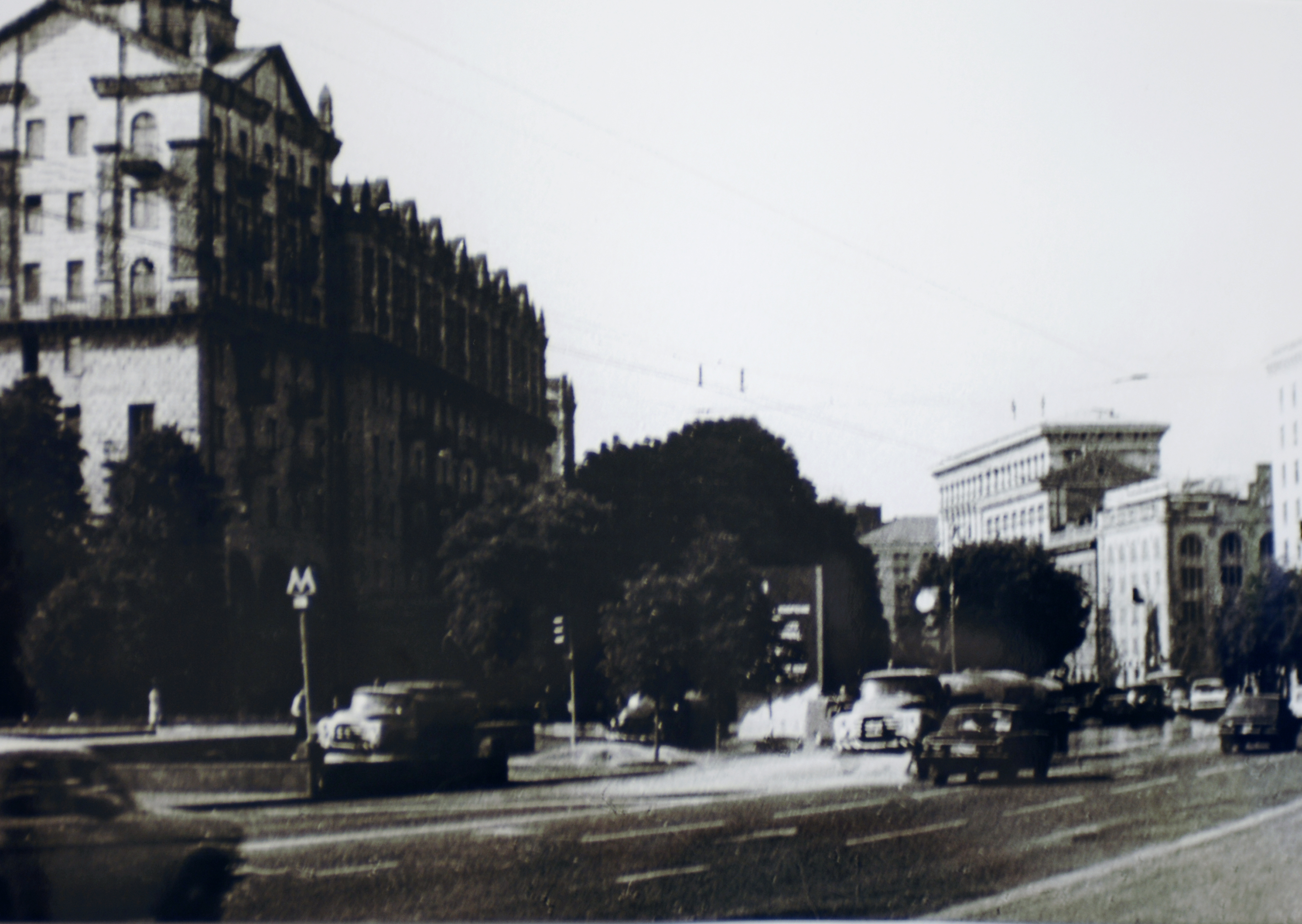
Use of water for decontamination in Kyiv 5 days after the Chernobyl disaster, 1 May 1986

Gorbachev's policies of perestroika and glasnost (English: restructuring and openness) failed to reach Ukraine as early as other Soviet republics because of the influence of Volodymyr Shcherbytsky, a conservative communist appointed by Brezhnev as the First Secretary of the Ukrainian Communist Party. The Chernobyl disaster of 1986, the russification policies, and the apparent social and economic stagnation led many Ukrainians to oppose Soviet rule. Gorbachev's policy of perestroika was also never introduced into practice, 95 percent of industry and agriculture was still owned by the Soviet state in 1990. The talk of reform, but the lack of introducing reform into practice, led to confusion which in turn evolved into opposition to the Soviet state itself. The policy of glasnost, which ended state censorship, led the Ukrainian diaspora to reconnect with their compatriots in Ukraine, the revitalisation of religious practices by destroying the monopoly of the Russian Orthodox Church and led to the establishment of several opposition pamphlets, journals and newspapers.

Glasnost policies resulted in the publication of previously classified information on Soviet history, including materials on the Holodomor of 1932–1933 and produced a significant change in outlooks of the Ukrainian elite. Among prominent people who became disillusioned with the Soviet regime were Ukrainian Central Committee member Leonid Kravchuk and poet Dmytro Pavlychko, both of whom adopted positions critical of Moscow's Communist rule. The issue of Holodomor was first mentioned on the highest level in July 1988 during Borys Oliynyk's speech at the 19th all-Union Party Conference. In his interview given in November of the same year, writer Yuriy Shcherbak called the famine an element of terror against the Ukrainian national liberation movement. In 1990 the Institute of Party History of the Central Committee of the Communist Party of Ukraine published a collection of documents dedicated to the famine, which was approved by first secretary Volodymyr Ivashko. Simultaneously, publication of previously banned works on Ukrainian history, including Mykhailo Hrushevsky's History of Ukraine-Rus, texts by Dmytro Yavornytsky and Mykhailo Drahomanov, memoirs of Volodymyr Vynnychenko and the History of Ruthenians was initiated by a Ukrainian party commission.

==== Rise of civil society ====
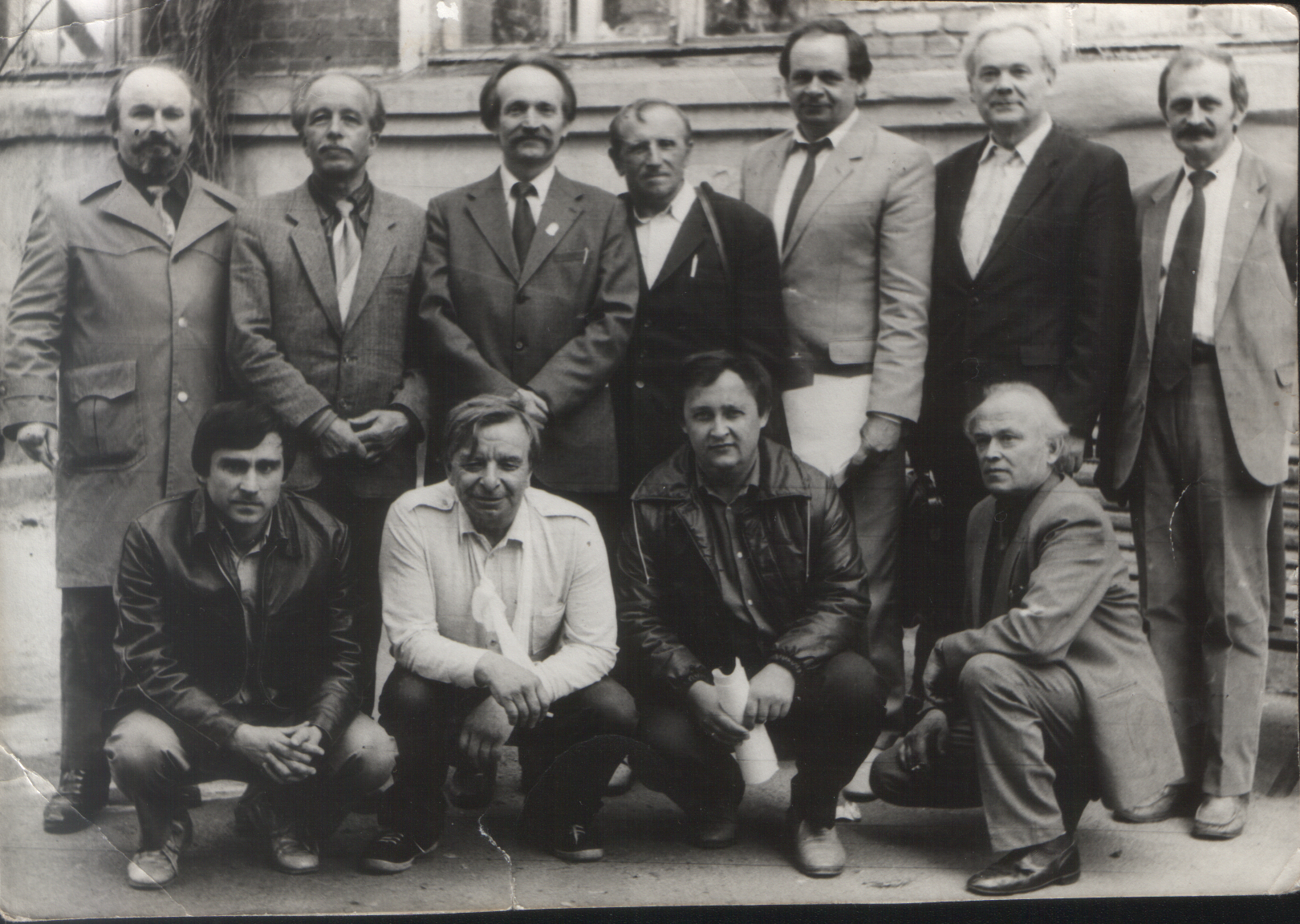
Members of the Ukrainian Helsinki Union in 1989 with Chornovil standing 3rd from left

The beginning of Perestroika was signified by the emergence of Soviet Ukraine's first non-government civic organizations. The first of them, the Ukrainian Culturological Club and the Lion's Society, were established in 1987 by youth representatives and dissidents. A big role after the Chernobyl Disaster was played by the ecology movement. In March 1988 former members of the Ukrainian Helsinki Group established the Ukrainian Helsinki Union under the leadership of Levko Lukianenko, who was released from prison later that year. In 1987 The Ukrainian Herald resumed publishing after a 15-year pause, making it the first legal independent political publication in Ukraine. In February 1989 the Shevchenko Ukrainian Language Society was established under the leadership of Dmytro Pavlychko. In October of the same year the Supreme Council of Ukrainian SSR adopted the Law on Languages, which officially recognized Ukrainian as state language.

Starting from 1988, first mass demonstrations were organized by non-governmental organizations in several Ukrainian cities. Their participants voiced opposition to the suppression of Ukrainian language, condemned plans to construct new nuclear power plants and commemorated victims of the Holodomor and Stalinist repression. In summer 1989 miners' strikes engulfed Donbas and the Lviv-Volyn coal basin, with their participants demanding better working conditions and higher wages. On 8-10 September 1989 the constituent congress of the People's Movement of Ukraine (Rukh) was organized in Kyiv, with Ivan Drach being elected as its leader. The movement's program didn't contain demands for immediate proclamation of Ukraine's independence, but voiced support of reformist forces in the Communist Party. On 21 January 1990 Rukh activists organized a human chain in memory of the 1919 Unification Act between the Ukrainian People's Republic and West Ukrainian People's Republic, during which hundreds of thousands of participants connected Kyiv with Lviv and Ivano-Frankivsk. By October 1990 the number of Rukh's activists had increased to 633,000, and it enjoyed support from over 5 million people.

==== Economic reforms ====
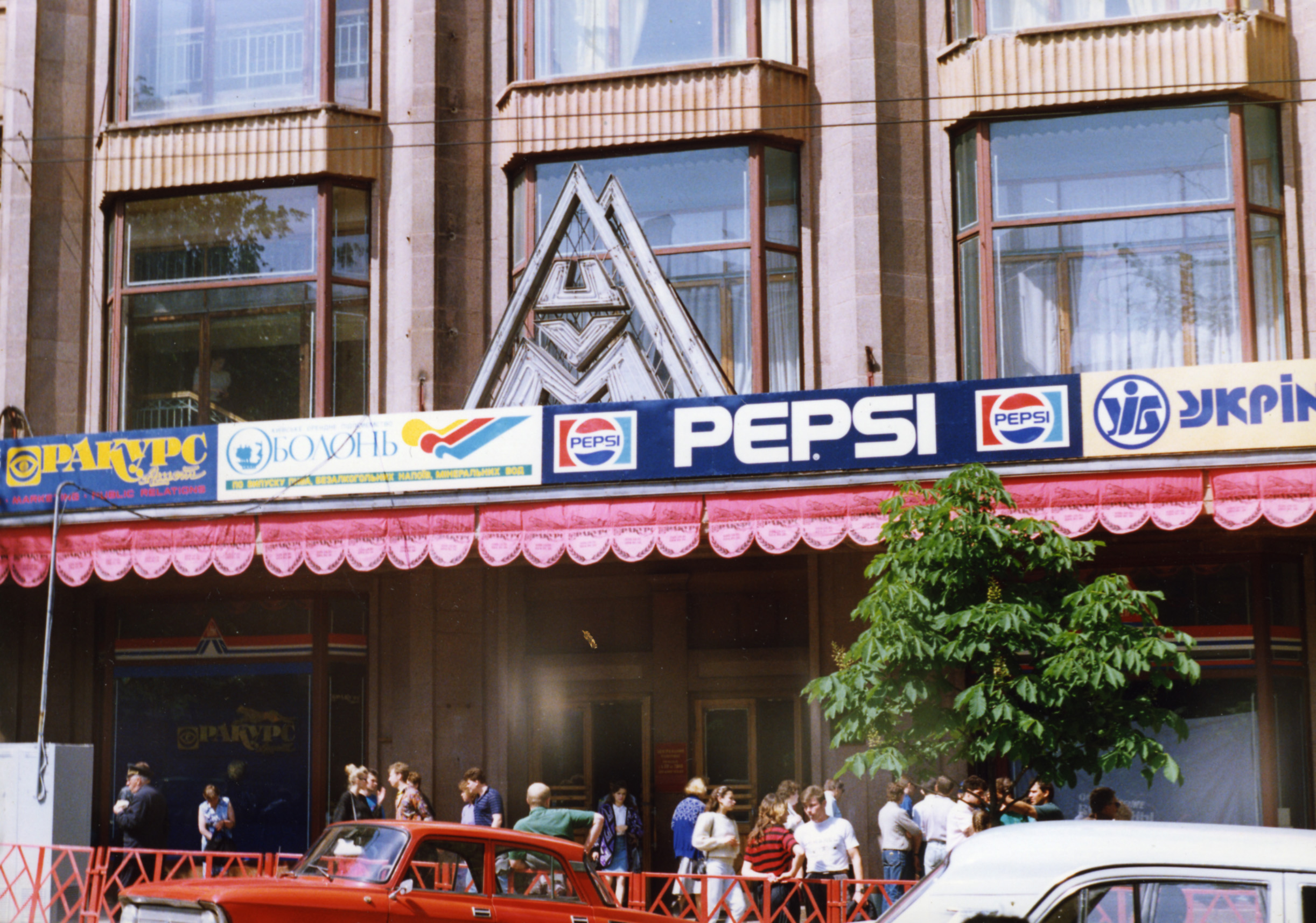
Advertising on the Central Department Store in Kyiv, 1989

The Soviet anti-alcohol campaign, initiated by Gorbachev in 1985, was widely perceived as a demonstration of the regime's incompetence and resulted in the spread of drug addiction and destruction of valuable vineyards in Crimea and Transcarpathia. Additionally, the increase of moonshine production resulting from the government bans led to a deficit of sugar in stores. Following a period of crackdown on private enterprise, in November 1986 Soviet authorities adopted the Law on Individual Labour Activities, which permitted the formation of cooperatives, predominantly in the spheres of catering and other services. By the late 1980s cooperatives in Ukraine employed 700,000 people and produced the value of almost 5 billion rubles. Functioning in a command economy system, cooperatives worked according to market laws and served as a school of free enterprise for Soviet people. In 1989 a government commission headed by Leonid Abalkin proposed to decrease state involvement in the economy and initiate a transition to free market. Meanwhile, the increasing devaluation of Soviet ruble led to the emergence of barter relations between enterprises. In order to prevent outflow of goods, in late 1990 Ukrainian authorities introduced consumer coupons for purchase of basic goods in the republic. On 3 August 1990 the Supreme Soviet of the Ukrainian SSR adopted the Law on Economic Sovereignty, which gave Ukrainian authorities right to define the republic's strategy of economic development.

==== Establishment of sovereignty ====
Composition of the Supreme Soviet of Ukraine after the March 1990 election (Communists in Red, Democratic Bloc in blue)

In March 1989 first free elections since 1917 took place in the Soviet Union. In Ukraine, the vote was notable due to the failure of several high-ranked Communist officials to get elected. Nevertheless, 87,8% of Ukraine's representatives in the Congress of People's Deputies were members of the Communist Party. At the same time, CPSU ceased to be a de-facto state institution and was forced to compete on par with other political forces. Preparing for the following elections to the Ukrainian Supreme Soviet, in November 1989 Ukrainian civic activists established the Democratic Bloc, which included representatives of Rukh, Memorial, Ukrainian Helsinki Union and other organizations. As a result of the elections on 4 March 1990, the bloc failed to achieve victory in most of Ukraine, but received an absolute majority of votes in Lviv, Ivano-Frankivsk and Ternopil oblasts. The following months were marked with the establishment of first Ukrainian parties serving as an alternative to Communists: in April the Ukrainian Republican Party was founded in Kyiv, and Ukrainian Christian Democratic Party was created in Lviv. In June the Liberal Democratic Party of Ukraine organized its foundational congress in Kyiv University, and in September the Democratic Party of Ukraine was organized in Terebovlia. During the same month, the Green Party of Ukraine was officially established. Still, by early 1991 all new parties included only 30,000 members in comparison to almost 3 million people in the rows of the Communist Party of Ukraine. In February 1990 the "Democratic Platform" of the Communist Party of Ukraine constituted itself at a congress in Kharkiv. Its program promoted the abandonment of Communist ideological monopoly and supported transformation of the organization into a regular parliamentary party. After the platform failed to get support of the Central Committee, many of its members entered the Party of Democratic Revival of Ukraine, which constituted itself in December 1990.

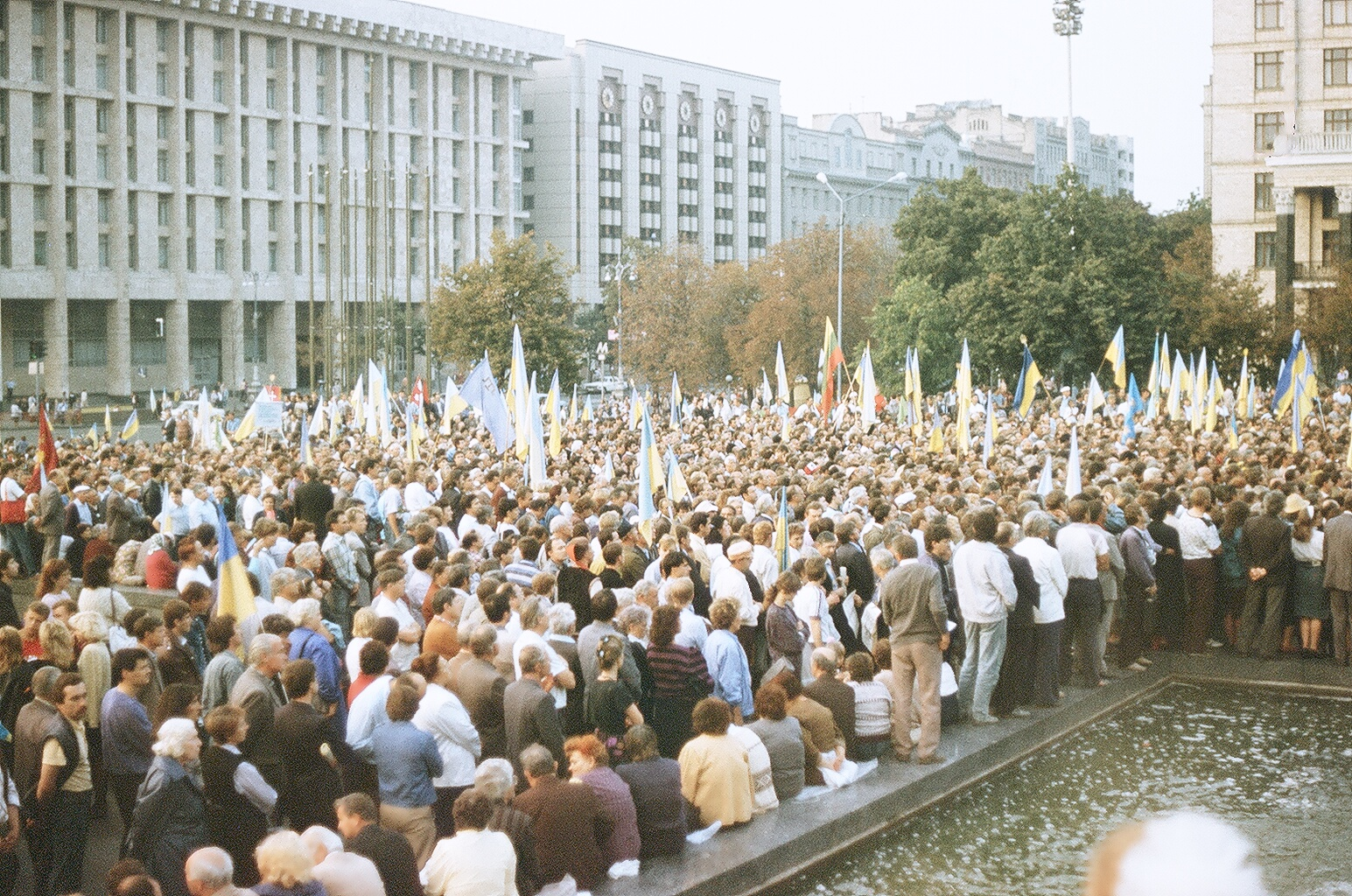
A demonstration under Ukrainian flags in Kyiv, July 1990

The opening of Ukraine's newly elected Supreme Council on 15 May 1990 was marked by fierce opposition between the Communist majority and the fraction of Democratic Bloc, known as "People's Council". In order to accommodate the opposition, majority leader Oleksandr Moroz allowed its representatives to establish control over seven parliamentary commissions. The ongoing power struggle between Gorbachev and Boris Yeltsin in Moscow led to the adoption of pro-sovereignty positions by many members of Ukrainian Communist nomenklatura. Following the adoption of sovereignty declarations by parliaments of several Soviet republics, on 16 July 1990 the Supreme Soviet of Ukraine adopted its own Declaration of State Sovereignty, which included notions of equality and self-sufficiency in spheres of interior and foreign affairs, economy, finance and culture, proclaimed the right of free development for all ethnicities inhabiting Ukraine, and issued claims on own armed forces, police and security services. On 18 July Leonid Kravchuk was elected new head of the Supreme Council, replacing Volodymyr Ivashko. On 10 October, the parliament adopted a resolution on the return of all Ukrainian conscripts from other republics of the Soviet Union in order to continue their service in Ukraine.

==== Downfall of the Communist regime ====
Following the declarations of sovereignty by republics, Gorbachev and his supporters produced a draft of the New Union Treaty, which envisioned the republics as sovereign entities, but recognized the supremacy of the Union's law over local legislation. Rukh members opposed that project and demanded that the Supreme Council establish bilateral relations with Ukraine's neighbours. The unwillingness of the Supreme Council to introduce promised reforms led to a wave of dissatisfaction in the society, and in October 1990 a hunger strike organized by students in Kyiv forced the parliament to remove Vitaliy Masol from the post of prime minister, replacing him with Vitold Fokin. On 23 October the Supreme Soviet abolished Article 6 of the Ukrainian Soviet constitution. Another important reform provided more authonomy to local government. On 17 March 1991 a referendum on the preservation of the Soviet Union took place simultaneously with an all-Ukrainian survey organized by the Supreme Soviet of Ukraine in respect to the Declaration of State Sovereignty. Both the question on the preservation of USSR and the question on Ukraine's sovereignty inside of the union received a positive answer from the majority of voters. On 3 July 1991 the Supreme Council introduced the title of President of Ukraine and adopted election for that post for 1 December.

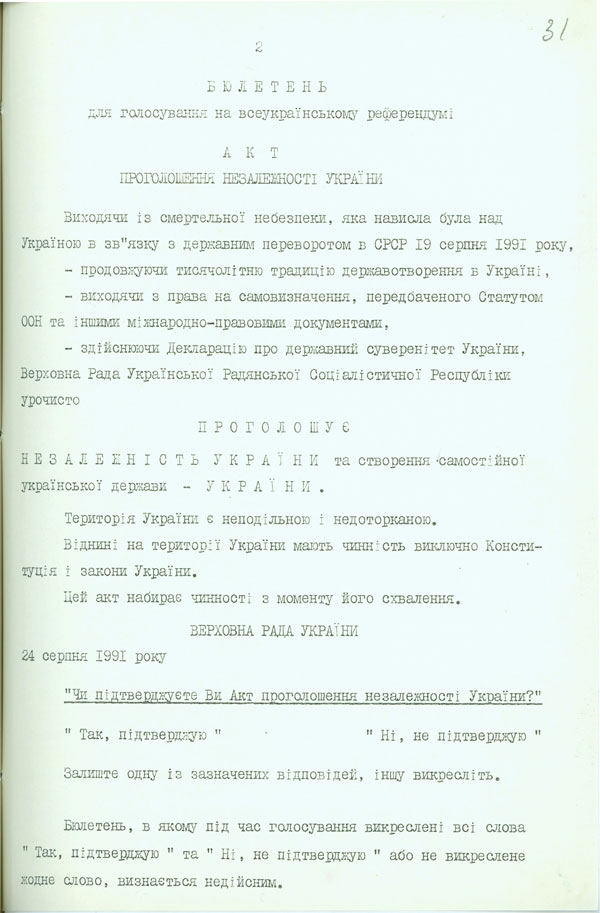
The Declaration of Independence, as printed on the ballot for the referendum on 1 December 1991

Following the start of the August Coup in Moscow on 19 August 1991, Soviet Army commander Valentin Varennikov was dispatched to Kyiv, and informed the Supreme Soviet that any attempts to disregard the decisions of the State Emergency Committee would lead to the introduction of martial law in the republic. Varennikov's declaration was delivered in presence of Ukrainian First Secretary Stanislav Hurenko and a number of generals. Speaking on television on the same day, Leonid Kravchuk declared his support for constitutional norms and democracy, warning against bloodshed, but didn't adopt a clear position. In response to the coup, democratic opposition organized protest meetings in a number of cities. After receiving information about the indecision of coup organizers in Moscow, on 20 August Kravchuk declared his intention to protect Ukraine's sovereignty. On the same day, Presidium of the Supreme Soviet of Ukraine refused to recognize orders of the State Emergency Committee. Simultaneously, regional administrations in several Ukrainian regions and Crimea recognized the committee's authority under the influence of local Communists. Following the coup's failure, on 23 August the Central Committee of the Communist Party of Ukraine issued an official condemnation of the event. On 24 August 1991, following a proposal by Ihor Yukhnovskyi and other deputies, the Supreme Soviet of the Ukrainian SSR adopted the Act of Declaration of Independence of Ukraine. This proclaimed Ukraine an independent sovereign state, marking the end of the Ukrainian SSR and its status as a constituent republic of the Soviet Union. On 26 August the activities of the Communist Party of Ukraine were suspended, and four days later the party was banned due to its members' participation in the coup attempt. Former Communists nevertheless remained active in political life and soon reorganized themselves into new political organizations, such as the Socialist Party of Ukraine.

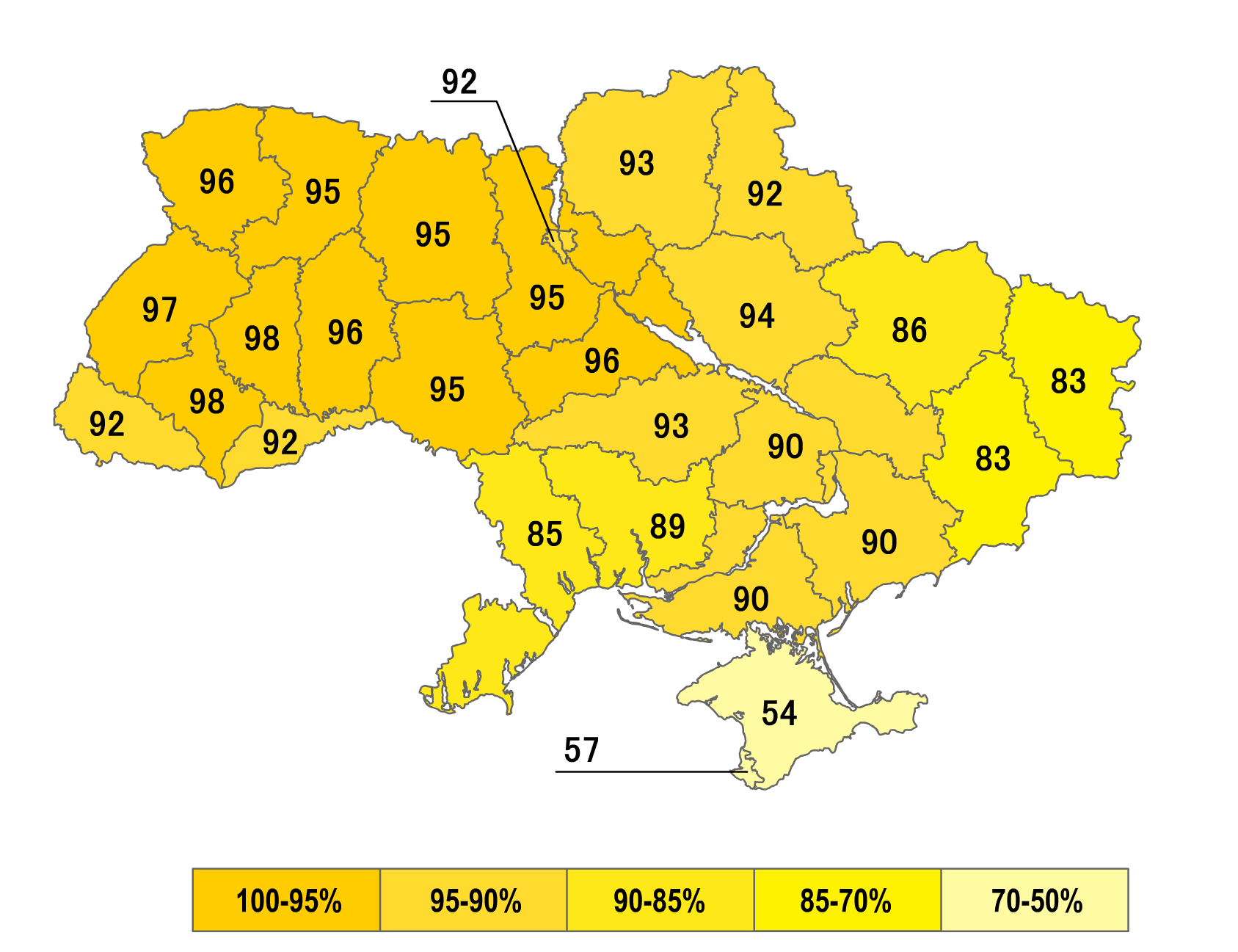
Percentage of support for Ukraine's independence by region during the 1 December 1991 referendum

A referendum on independence was held in Ukraine on 1 December 1991. 92.3% of voters voted for independence nationwide. The referendum carried in the majority of all oblasts, including Crimea where 54% voted for independence, and those in Eastern Ukraine where more than 80% voted for independence. In the 1991 Ukrainian presidential election held on the same day as the independence referendum, 62 percent of voters voted for Verkhovna Rada chairman Leonid Kravchuk, who had been vested with presidential powers since the Supreme Soviet's declaration of independence. Kravchuk and the other presidential candidates all supported independence and campaigned for a “yes” vote in the independence referendum.

For most of the Soviet Union's existence, Ukraine had been second only to Russia in economic and political power, and its secession ended any realistic chance of the Soviet Union staying together even on a limited scale. 8 December 1991, Kravchuk joined his Russian and Belarusian counterparts in signing the Belovezh Accords, which declared that the Soviet Union had effectively ceased to exist and founded the Commonwealth of Independent States as a quasi-replacement. On 21 December 1991, all the former Soviet republics (except Estonia, Georgia, Lithuania and Latvia) signed the Alma-Ata Protocol which reiterated that the Soviet Union had functionally ceased to exist and formally established the CIS. The Soviet Union formally dissolved on 26 December 1991.

== Politics and government ==
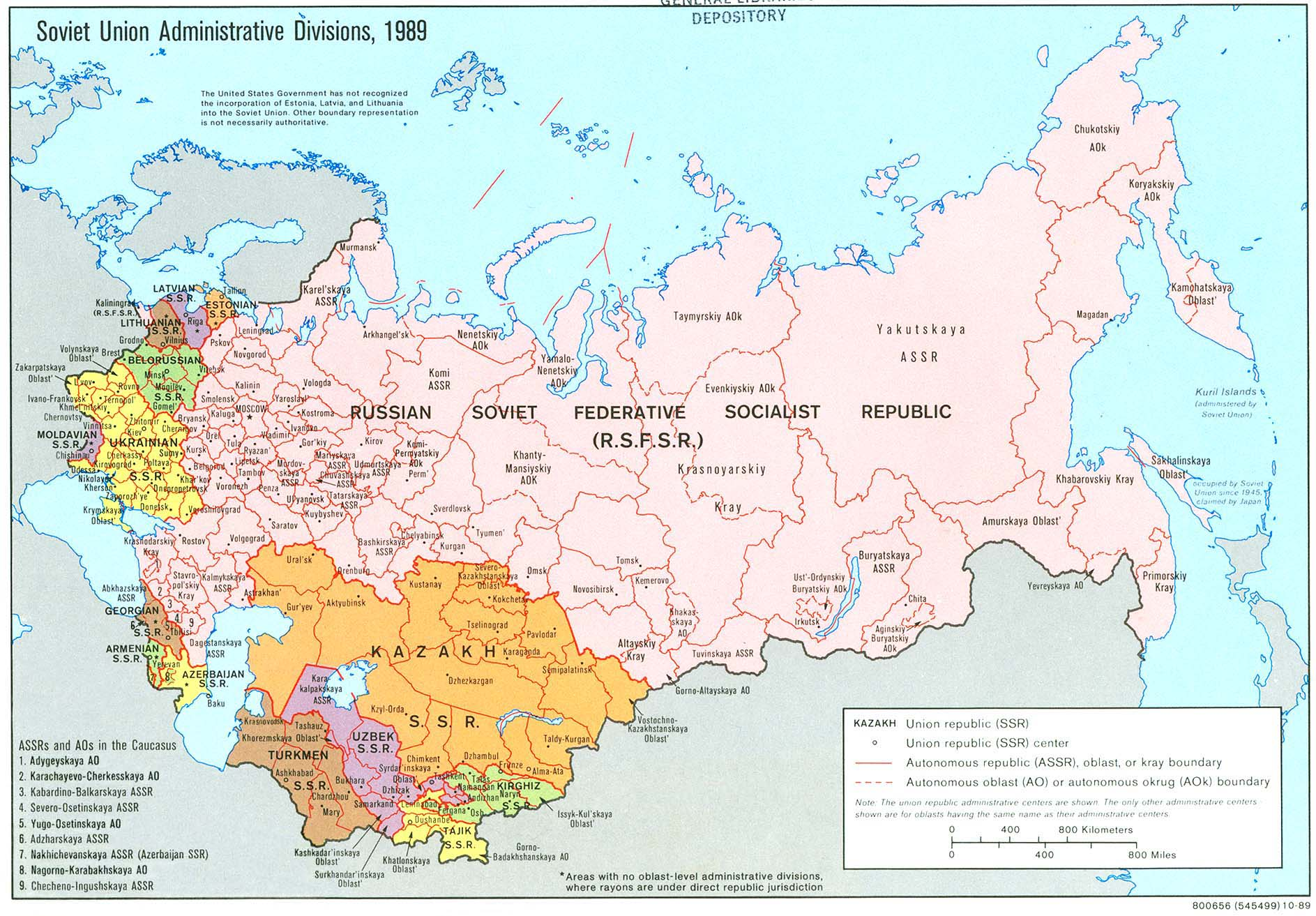
Location of the Ukrainian SSR (yellow) within the Soviet Union in 1954–1991

The Ukrainian SSR's system of government was based on a one-party communist system ruled by the Communist Party of Ukraine, a branch of the Communist Party of the Soviet Union (KPSS). The republic was one of 15 constituent republics composing the Soviet Union from its entry into the union in 1922 until its dissolution in 1991. All of the political power and authority in the USSR was in the hands of Communist Party authorities, with little real power being concentrated in official government bodies and organs. In such a system, lower-level authorities directly reported to higher level authorities and so on, with the bulk of the power being held at the highest echelons of the Communist Party. The regime established by the Bolsheviks in Ukraine and other Soviet republics can be characterized as a form of party oligarchy.

Originally, the legislative authority was vested in the Congress of Soviets of Ukraine, whose Central Executive Committee was for many years headed by Grigory Petrovsky. Soon after publishing a Stalinist constitution, the Congress of Soviets was transformed into the Supreme Soviet (and the Central Executive Committee into its Presidium), which consisted of 450 deputies. (Note: The number of Supreme Soviet deputies varied from 435 in 1955, to 650 in 1977, then finally down to 450 by 1990.) The Supreme Soviet had the authority to enact legislation, amend the constitution, adopt new administrative and territorial boundaries, adopt the budget, and establish political and economic development plans. In addition, parliament also had to authority to elect the republic's executive branch, the Council of Ministers as well as the power to appoint judges to the Supreme Court. Legislative sessions were short and were conducted for only a few weeks out of the year. In spite of this, the Supreme Soviet elected the Presidium, the Chairman, three deputy chairmen, a secretary, and couple of other government members to carry out the official functions and duties in between legislative sessions. Chairman of the Presidium was a powerful position in the republic's higher echelons of power, and could nominally be considered the equivalent of head of state, although most executive authority would be concentrated in the Communist Party's politburo and its First Secretary.

Full universal suffrage was granted for all eligible citizens aged 18 and over, excluding prisoners and those deprived of freedom. Although they could not be considered free and were of a symbolic nature, elections to the Supreme Soviet were contested every five years. Nominees from electoral districts from around the republic, typically consisting of an average of 110,000 inhabitants, were directly chosen by party authorities, providing little opportunity for political change, since all political authority was directly subordinate to the higher level above it.

With the beginning of Soviet General Secretary Mikhail Gorbachev's perestroika reforms towards the mid-late 1980s, electoral reform laws were passed in 1989, liberalising the nominating procedures and allowing multiple candidates to stand for election in a district. Accordingly, the first relatively free elections in the Ukrainian SSR were contested in March 1990. 111 deputies from the Democratic Bloc, a loose association of small pro-Ukrainian and pro-sovereignty parties and the instrumental People's Movement of Ukraine (colloquially known as Rukh in Ukrainian) were elected to the parliament. Although the Communist Party retained its majority with 331 deputies, large support for the Democratic Bloc demonstrated the people's distrust of the Communist authorities, which would eventually boil down to Ukrainian independence in 1991.

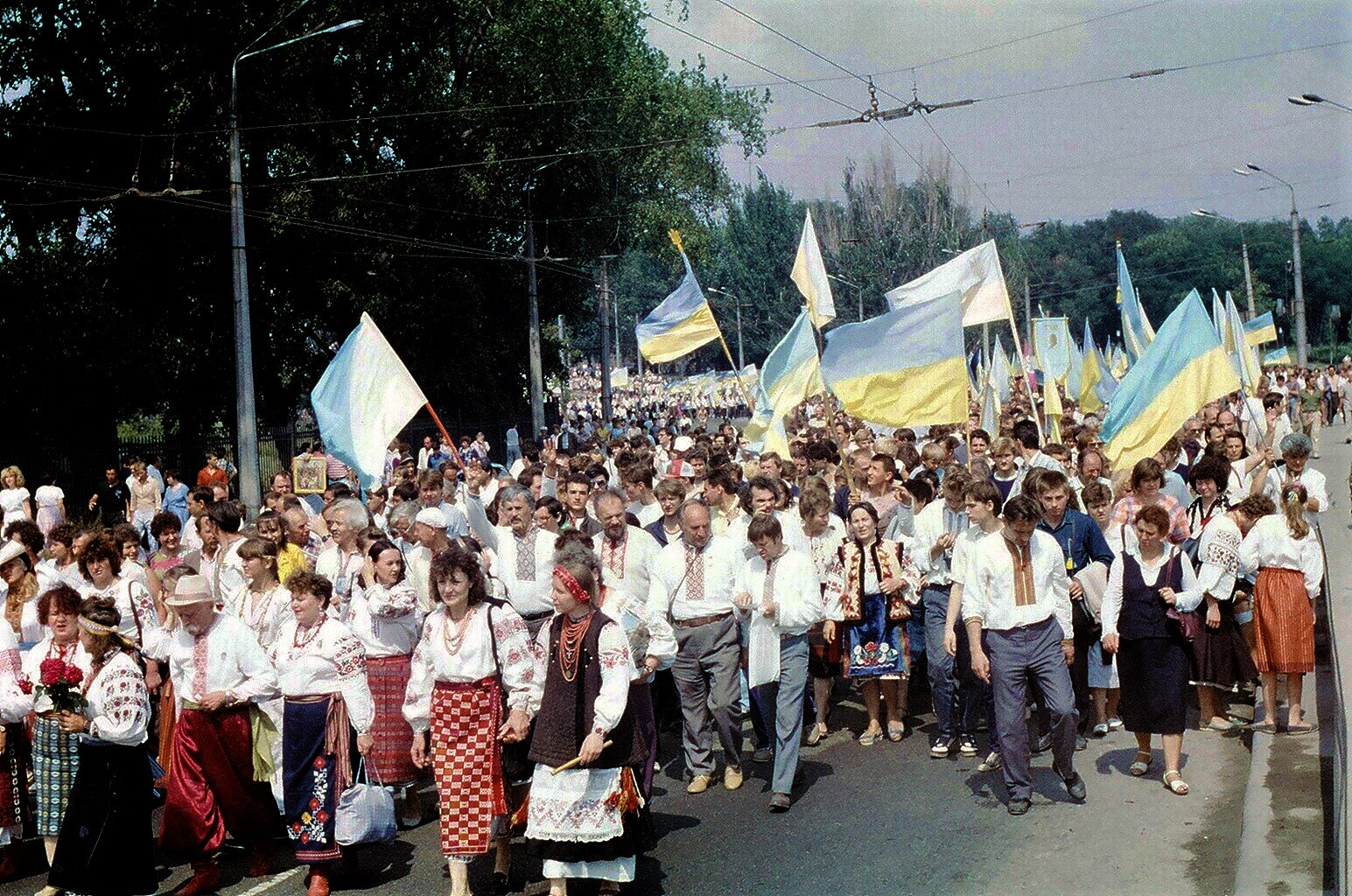
Anti-Soviet protesters with Ukrainian flags in Zaporizhzhia in 1990

Ukraine is the legal successor of the Ukrainian SSR and it stated to fulfill "those rights and duties pursuant to international agreements of Union SSR which do not contradict the Constitution of Ukraine and interests of the Republic" on 5 October 1991. After Ukrainian independence the Ukrainian SSR's parliament was changed from Supreme Soviet to its current name Verkhovna Rada, retaining its status as the country's legislature. Ukraine also has refused to recognize exclusive Russian claims to succession of the Soviet Union and claimed such status for Ukraine as well, which was stated in Articles 7 and 8 of On Legal Succession of Ukraine, issued in 1991. Following independence, Ukraine has continued to pursue claims against the Russian Federation in foreign courts, seeking to recover its share of the foreign property that was owned by the Soviet Union. It also retained its seat in the United Nations, held since 1945.

=== Foreign relations ===
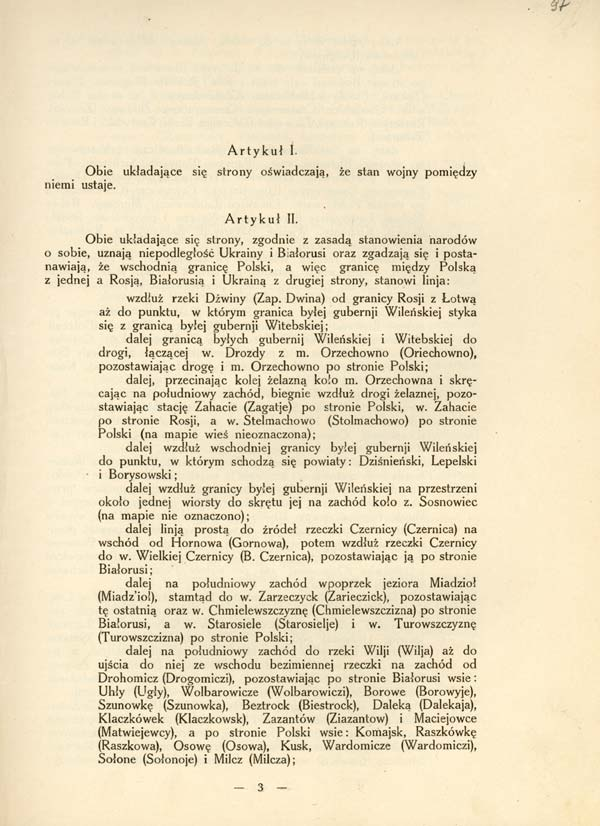
Polish text of the 1921 Treaty of Riga, recognizing the independence of Soviet Ukraine and Belarus

During the first years of its existence, Ukrainian SSR was the only Soviet republic along with Soviet Russia to establish its own foreign contacts. Following the signing of a union treaty with Russian SFSR on 28 December 1920, the government of Christian Rakovsky signed an agreement on cooperation with the Menshevik Georgian Democratic Republic, and on 14 February 1921 Soviet Ukraine established diplomatic ties with Lithuania. During the talks in Riga in 1921 Soviet Ukrainian representative Emmanuel Kviring supported the idea of establishing the republic's embassies in the capitals of great powers, as well as in Poland, Czechoslovakia, Romania and Austria. In October of the same year Alexander Shumsky was appointed ambassador of Soviet Ukraine in Warsaw. In 1921-1922 Ukrainian SSR signed peace treaties with Estonia and Latvia, and established friendly relations with Turkey. Soviet Ukrainian trade missions were established in several European cities. However, starting from 1922 Ukrainian SSR was forced to cease the activities of its diplomatic organs under pressure from Moscow. At the Lausanne Conference representatives of Soviet Ukraine took part in negotiations as part of a common delegation with representatives of Soviet Russia and Soviet Georgia, headed by Georgy Chicherin. In September 1923 the diplomatic apparatus of Ukrainian SSR ceased its existence, and its consulates and services were incorporated into the all-Union commissariat.

During the following decades, the Ukrainian SSR, along with the rest of the 15 republics, had virtually no say in their own foreign affairs. However, since 1944, the Ukrainian SSR was permitted to establish bilateral relations with countries and maintain its own standing army. This clause was used to permit the republic's membership in the United Nations, alongside the Byelorussian SSR. Accordingly, representatives from the "Ukrainian Soviet Socialist Republic" and 50 other states founded the UN on 24 October 1945. In effect, this provided the Soviet Union (a permanent Security Council member with veto powers) with another two votes in the General Assembly. (Note: The Byelorussian Soviet Socialist Republic was in the same such situation, being a signatory to United Nations Charter, although not being independent until 1991.) The latter aspect of the 1944 clauses was never fulfilled and the republic's defense matters were managed by the Soviet Armed Forces and the Defense Ministry. Another right that was granted but never used until 1991 was the right of the Soviet republics to secede from the union, which was codified in each of the Soviet constitutions. Accordingly, Article 69 of the Constitution of the Ukrainian SSR stated: "The Ukrainian SSR retains the right to willfully secede from the USSR." However, a republic's theoretical secession from the union was virtually impossible and unrealistic in many ways until after Gorbachev's perestroika reforms.

The Ukrainian SSR was a member of the UN Economic and Social Council, UNICEF, International Labour Organization, Universal Postal Union, World Health Organization, UNESCO, International Telecommunication Union, United Nations Economic Commission for Europe, World Intellectual Property Organization and the International Atomic Energy Agency. It was not separately a member of the Warsaw Pact, Comecon, the World Federation of Trade Unions and the World Federation of Democratic Youth, and since 1949, the International Olympic Committee.

On 23 June 1954, the civilian oil tanker Tuapse of the Black Sea Shipping Company based in Odessa was hijacked by a fleet of Republic of China Navy in the high sea of 19°35′N, 120°39′E, west of Balintang Channel near Philippines, whereas the 49 Ukrainian, Russian and Moldovan crew were detained by the Kuomintang regime in various terms up to 34 years in captivity with three deaths.

== Administrative divisions ==
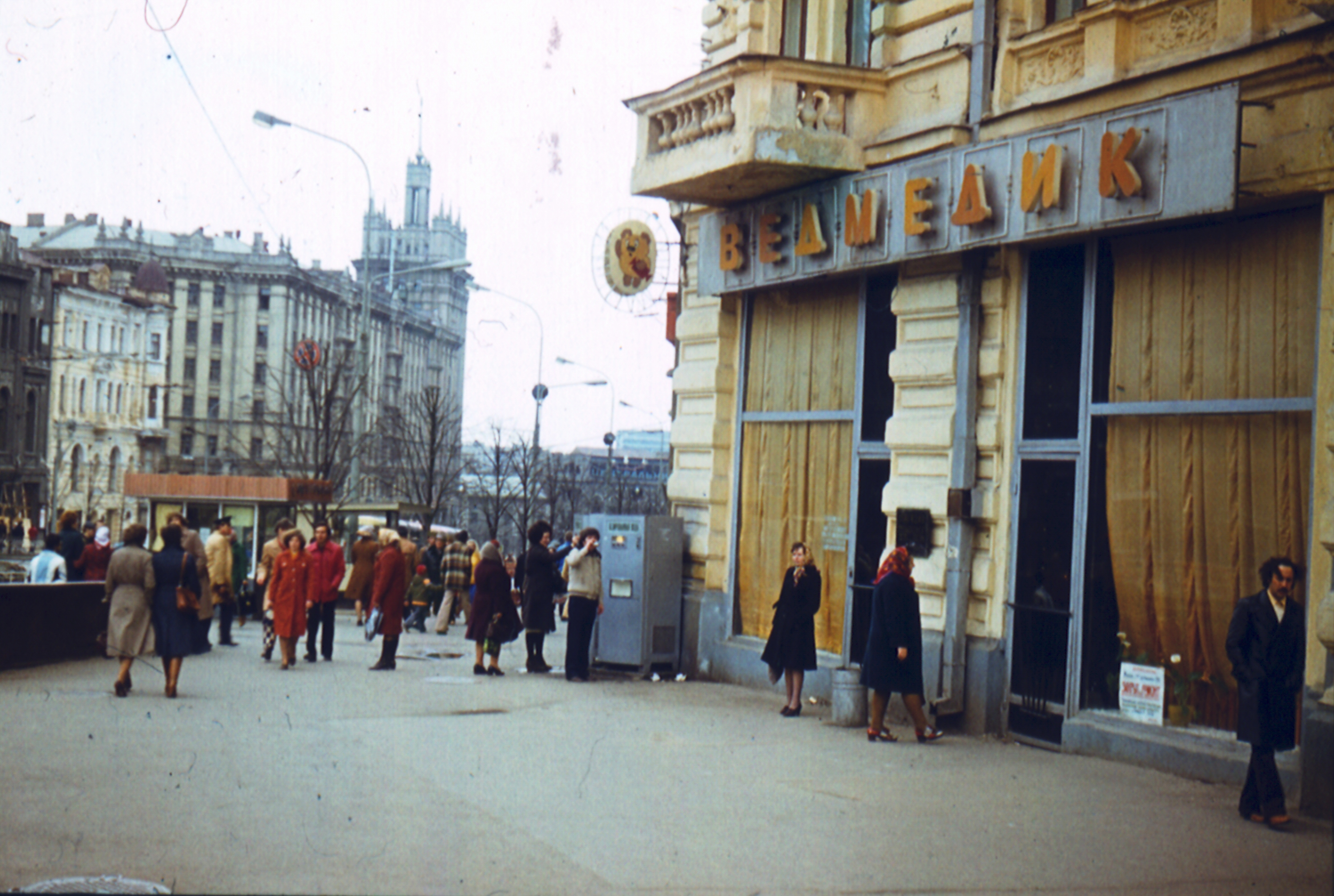
Central Kharkov in 1981

Legally, the Soviet Union and its fifteen union republics constituted a federal system, but the country was functionally a highly centralised state, with all major decision-making taking place in the Kremlin, the capital and seat of government of the country. The constituent republics were essentially unitary states, with lower levels of power being directly subordinate to higher ones. Throughout its 72-year existence, the administrative divisions of the Ukrainian SSR changed numerous times, often incorporating regional reorganisation and annexation on the part of Soviet authorities during World War II.

The most common administrative division was the oblast (province), of which there were 25 upon the republic's independence from the Soviet Union in 1991. Provinces were further subdivided into raions (districts) which numbered 490. The rest of the administrative division within the provinces consisted of cities, urban-type settlements, and villages. Cities in the Ukrainian SSR were a separate exception, which could either be subordinate to either the provincial authorities themselves or the district authorities of which they were the administrative center. Two cities, the capital Kiev, and Sevastopol (which hosted a large Soviet Navy base in Crimea), were uniquely designated "cities with special status." This meant that they were directly subordinate to the central Ukrainian SSR authorities and not the provincial authorities surrounding them.

=== Historical formation ===
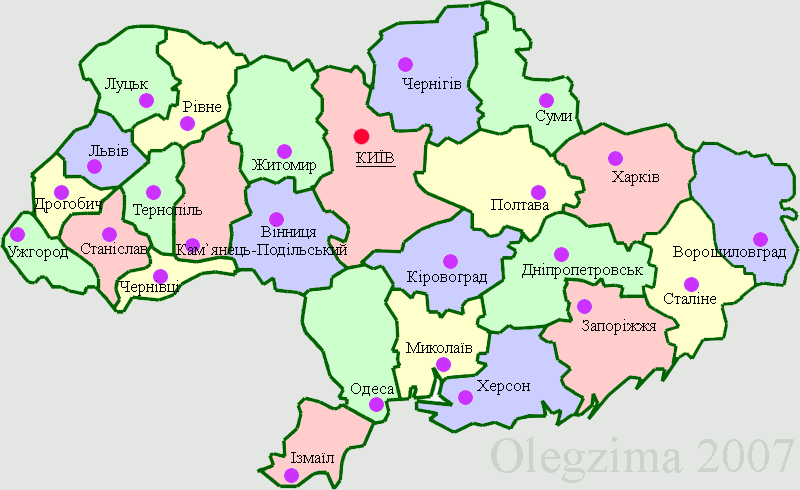
The 25 oblasts of Ukraine through 1946 to 1954. Crimea would be transferred in 1954 and the Drohobych and Izmail oblasts would be absorbed by, respectively, the Lvov and Odessa oblasts.

However, the history of administrative divisions in the republic was not so clear cut. At the end of World War I in 1918, Ukraine was invaded by Soviet Russia as the Russian puppet government of the Ukrainian SSR and without official declaration it ignited the Ukrainian–Soviet War. Government of the Ukrainian SSR from very start was managed by the Communist Party of Ukraine that was created in Moscow and was originally formed out of the Bolshevik organisational centers in Ukraine. Occupying the eastern city of Kharkov, the Soviet forces chose it as the republic's seat of government, colloquially named in the media as "Kharkov – Pervaya Stolitsa (the first capital)" with implication to the era of Soviet regime. Kharkov was also the city where the first Soviet Ukrainian government was created in 1917 with strong support from Russian SFSR authorities. However, in 1934, the capital was moved from Kharkov to Kiev, which remains the capital of Ukraine today.

During the 1930s, there were significant numbers of ethnic minorities living within the Ukrainian SSR. National Districts were formed as separate territorial-administrative units within higher-level provincial authorities. Districts were established for the republic's three largest minority groups, which were the Jews, Russians, and Poles. Other ethnic groups, however, were allowed to petition the government for their own national autonomy. In 1924 on the territory of Ukrainian SSR was formed the Moldavian Autonomous Soviet Socialist Republic. Upon the 1940 conquest of Bessarabia and Bukovina by Soviet troops the Moldavian ASSR was passed to the newly formed Moldavian Soviet Socialist Republic, while Budzhak and Bukovina were secured by the Ukrainian SSR. Following the creation of the Ukrainian SSR significant numbers of ethnic Ukrainians found themselves living outside the Ukrainian SSR. In the 1920s the Ukrainian SSR was forced to cede several territories to Russia in Severia, Sloboda Ukraine and Azov littoral including such cities like Belgorod, Taganrog and Starodub. In the 1920s the administration of the Ukrainian SSR insisted in vain on reviewing the border between the Ukrainian Soviet Republics and the Russian Soviet Republic based on the 1926 First All-Union Census of the Soviet Union that showed that 4.5 millions of Ukrainians were living on Russian territories bordering Ukraine. A forced end to Ukrainisation in southern Russian Soviet Republic led to a massive decline of reported Ukrainians in these regions in the 1937 Soviet Census.

Upon signing of the Molotov–Ribbentrop Pact, Nazi Germany and Soviet Union partitioned Poland and its Eastern Borderlands were secured by the Soviet buffer republics with Ukraine securing the territory of Eastern Galicia. The Soviet September Polish campaign in Soviet propaganda was portrayed as the Golden September for Ukrainians, given the unification of Ukrainian lands on both banks of Zbruch River, until then the border between the Soviet Union and the Polish communities inhabited by Ukrainian speaking families.

== Economy ==
=== Before 1945 ===
At the onset of Soviet Ukraine, having largely inherited conditions from the Tsarist Empire, one of the biggest exporters of wheat in the world, the Ukrainian economy was still centered around agriculture, with over 90% of the workforce being peasants. In the 1920s, Soviet policies in Ukraine attached importance to developing the economy. The initial agenda, War Communism, had prescribed total communisation and appropriation per quota of food from the people by force - further economic damage and a 1921–1923 famine in Ukraine claiming up to one million lives ensued. With the New Economic Policy and the partial introduction of free markets, an economic recovery followed.

During the 1920s, the majority of Ukraine's economic enterprises was subordinated to the union centre. In 1921 Soviet Ukraine's authorities introduced the system of khozraschet, which turned enterprises into autonomous subjects of the economy. Such enterprises were united into trusts, which represented separate branches of industry. At the same time, trusts were barred from paying taxes from their fixed assets, and were instead obliged to deliver a specially introduced "industrial tax", which increased their dependence on the state budget. The economic system was distorted due to the prioritization of non-consumer production by the regime. The period of NEP saw the revival of credit and financial institutions, a currency reform and the organization of state trade and cooperation. Starting from 1925 the economic policies experienced a turn towards industrialization and collectivization.

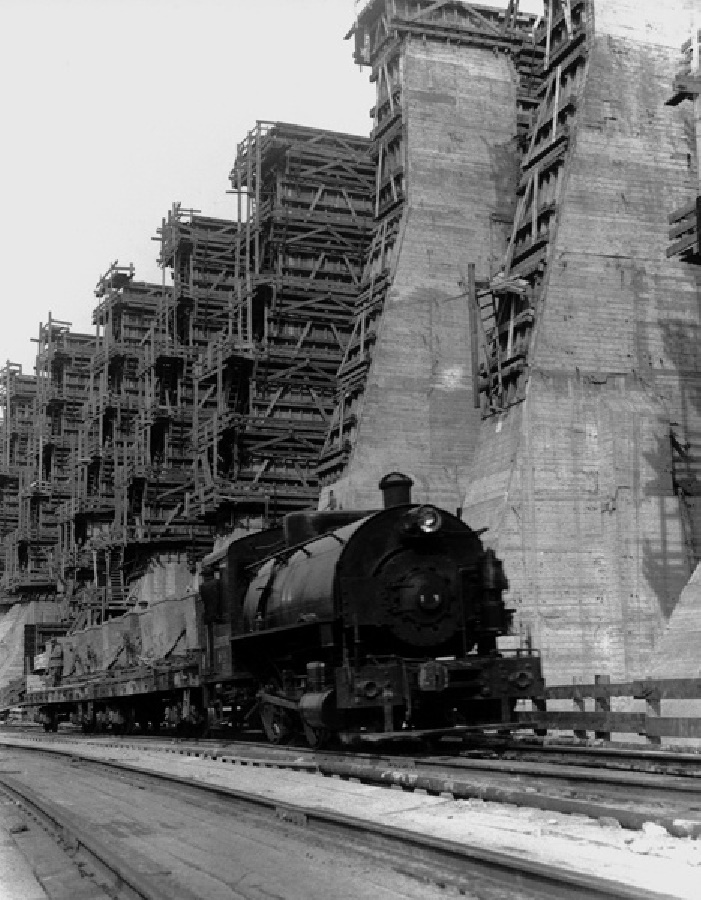
Construction of the Dnieper Hydroelectric Power Plant in Zaporizhzhia, 1931

After the death of Lenin and the consolidation of his power, Stalin was determined to accelerate industrialisation and reversed policy again. As heavy industry and wheat exports boomed, common people in rural areas were bearing a cost. Gradually escalating measures, from raised taxes, dispossession of property, and forced deportations into Siberia culminated in extremely high grain delivery quotas. Even though there is no evidence that agricultural yield could not feed the population at the time, four million Ukrainians were starved to death during the 1932–1933 Holodomor, while Moscow exported over a million tonnes of grain to the West, decimating the population.

In the aftermath of collectivization, the Soviet regime achieved a mode of coexistence with Ukraine's peasants through the employment of women in order to compensate for demographic losses during the famine, as well as mechanization of agriculture and the introduction of a passport system. In the industrial sphere, Soviet Ukraine during the 1930s was dominated by metallurgy and food industry. Between 1928 and 1937 the industrial growth in Ukrainian SSR achieved record numbers worldwide. The number of workers grew almost threefold. For the first time in history, by the late 1930s, less than half of Soviet Ukraine's population was employed in agriculture. During that time the republic was Europe's second biggest producer of pig iron and took the fourth place worldwide in coal production. At the same time, the development of Ukraine's industry repeated pre-revolutionary patterns, with most of its centers being concentrated in the Donbas-Dnieper region.

=== After 1945 ===
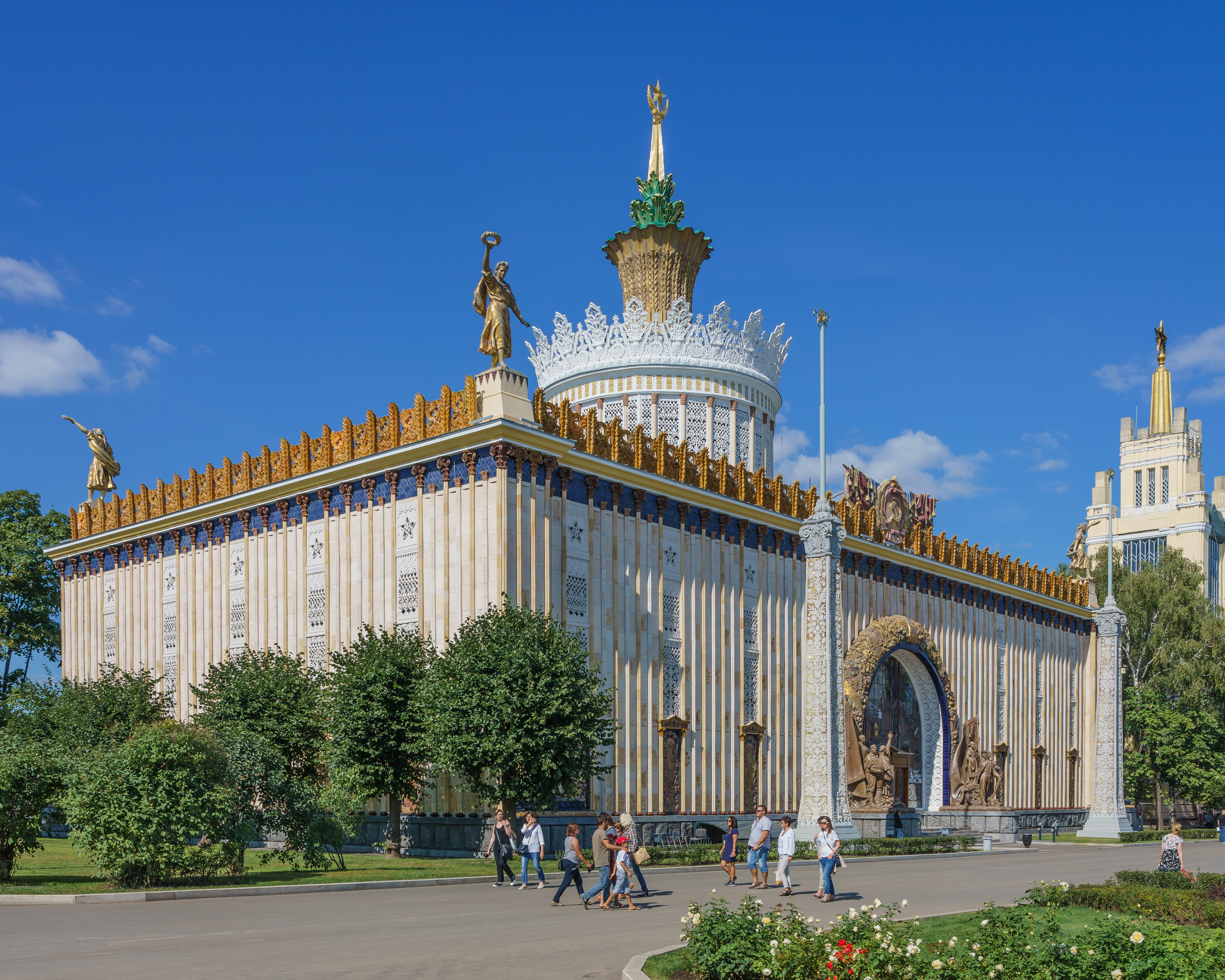
Pavilion of Ukraine at the All-Soviet Exhibition Centre in Moscow

==== Agriculture ====
In 1945, agricultural production stood at only 40 percent of the 1940 level, even though the republic's territorial expansion had "increased the amount of arable land". In contrast to the remarkable growth in the industrial sector, agriculture continued in Ukraine, as in the rest of the Soviet Union, to function as the economy's Achilles heel. Despite the human toll of collectivisation of agriculture in the Soviet Union, especially in Ukraine, Soviet planners still believed in the effectiveness of collective farming. The old system was reestablished; the numbers of collective farms in Ukraine increased from 28 thousand in 1940 to 33 thousand in 1949, comprising 45 million hectares; the numbers of state farms barely increased, standing at 935 in 1950, comprising 12.1 million hectares. By the end of the Fourth Five-Year Plan (in 1950) and the Fifth Five-Year Plan (in 1955), agricultural output still stood far lower than the 1940 level. The slow changes in agriculture can be explained by the low productivity in collective farms, and by bad weather-conditions, which the Soviet planning system could not effectively respond to. Grain for human consumption in the post-war years decreased, this in turn led to frequent and severe food shortages.

The increase of Soviet agricultural production was tremendous, however, the Soviet Ukrainians still experienced food shortages due to the inefficiencies of a highly centralised economy. During the peak of Soviet-Ukrainian agriculture output in the 1950s and early-to-mid-1960s, human consumption in Ukraine, and in the rest of the Soviet Union, actually experienced short intervals of decrease. There are many reasons for this inefficiency, but its origins can be traced back to the single-purchaser and -producer market system set up by Joseph Stalin. Khrushchev tried to improve the agricultural situation in the Soviet Union by expanding the total crop size – for instance, in the Ukrainian SSR alone "the amount of land planted with corn grew by 600 percent". At the height of this policy, between 1959 and 1963, one-third of Ukrainian arable land grew this crop. This policy decreased the total production of wheat and rye; Khrushchev had anticipated this, and the production of wheat and rye moved to Soviet Central Asia as part of the Virgin Lands Campaign. Khrushchev's agricultural policy failed, and in 1963 the Soviet Union had to import food from abroad. The total level of agricultural productivity in Ukraine decreased sharply during this period, but recovered in the 1970s and 1980s during Leonid Brezhnev's rule. A major role in Ukraine's agriculture during Soviet times was played by personal land plots, which were confiscated from peasant during Khrushchev's rule. Following their restoration to villagers by the late 1960s, they produced one-quarter of all vegetables and one-third of the total meat, lard, milk and fruit production, as well as more than half of all potatoes. The presence of such plots in Ukraine ameliorated the deficit of goods in the republic during the later years of Soviet rule, when rapid urbanisation produced an additional stress on agricultural producers.

In 1986 an attempt to reform Soviet agriculture was made through the introduction of Agroproms, which were tasked with controlling the production of agricultural goods. This system failed to bring results, and supply difficulties continued to increase. In March 1988 collective farmers were allowed to rent land plots for a period of up to 50 years and received control over goods produced in this way. However, local administration hindered the introduction of that reform, being supported by the majority of peasants themselves.

==== Industry ====
During the post-war years, Ukraine's industrial productivity doubled its pre-war level. In 1945 industrial output totalled only 26 percent of the 1940 level. The Soviet Union introduced the Fourth Five-Year Plan in 1946. The Fourth Five-Year Plan would prove to be a remarkable success, and can be likened to the "wonders of West German and Japanese reconstruction", but without foreign capital; the Soviet reconstruction is historically an impressive achievement. In 1950 industrial gross output had already surpassed 1940-levels. While the Soviet régime still emphasised heavy industry over light industry, the light-industry sector also grew. The increase in capital investment and the expansion of the labour force also benefited Ukraine's economic recovery. In the prewar years, 15.9 percent of the Soviet budget went to Ukraine, in 1950, during the Fourth Five-Year Plan this had increased to 19.3 percent. The workforce had increased from 1.2 million in 1945 to 2.9 million in 1955; an increase of 33.2 percent over the 1940-level. The result of this remarkable growth was that by 1955 Ukraine was producing 2.2 times more than in 1940, and the republic had become one of the leading producers of certain commodities in Europe. Ukraine was the largest per-capita producer in Europe of pig iron and sugar, and the second-largest per-capita producer of steel and of iron ore, and was the third largest per-capita producer of coal in Europe.

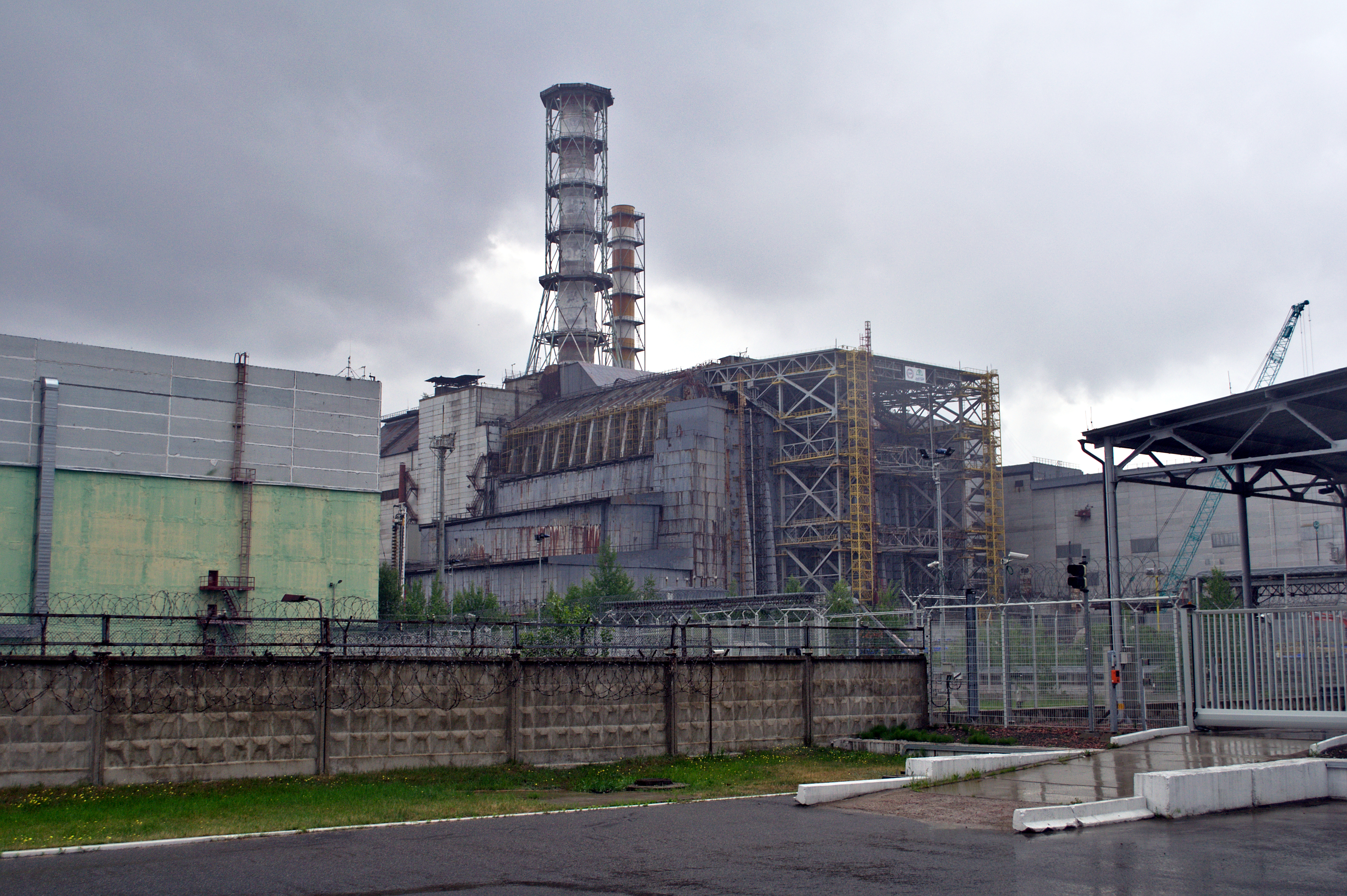
Site of the Chernobyl nuclear disaster

From 1965 until the dissolution of the Soviet Union in 1991, industrial growth in Ukraine decreased, and by the 1970s it started to stagnate. Significant economic decline did not become apparent before the 1970s. During the Fifth Five-Year Plan (1951–1955), industrial development in Ukraine grew by 13.5 percent, while during the Eleventh Five-Year Plan (1981–1985) industry grew by a relatively modest 3.5 percent. The double-digit growth seen in all branches of the economy in the post-war years had disappeared by the 1980s, entirely replaced by low growth-figures. An ongoing problem throughout the republic's existence was the planners' emphasis on heavy industry over consumer goods. Another issue was the wear of production facilities due to insufficient modernization expenditures by the government.

The urbanisation of Ukrainian society in the post-war years led to an increase in energy consumption. Between 1956 and 1972, to meet this increasing demand, the government built five water reservoirs along the Dnieper River. Aside from improving Soviet-Ukrainian water transport, the reservoirs became the sites for new power stations, and hydroelectric energy flourished in Ukraine in consequence. The natural-gas industry flourished as well, and Ukraine became the site of the first post-war production of gas in the Soviet Union; by the 1960s Ukraine's biggest gas field was producing 30 percent of the USSR's total gas production. The government was not able to meet the people's ever-increasing demand for energy consumption, but by the 1970s, the Soviet government had conceived an intensive nuclear power program. According to the Eleventh Five-Year Plan, the Soviet government would build 8 nuclear power plants in Ukraine by 1989. As a result of these efforts, Ukraine became highly diversified in energy consumption.

On 30 June 1987 the Law on State Enterprise was adopted by the Supreme Soviet of the Soviet Union, providing separate enterprises autonomy in planning, supplies and establishment of prices. In some spheres, it was even allowed to established trade contacts with foreign firms, which for the first time broke the foreign trade monopoly introduced under Lenin.

== Culture, science and religion ==
=== Stalinist era ===
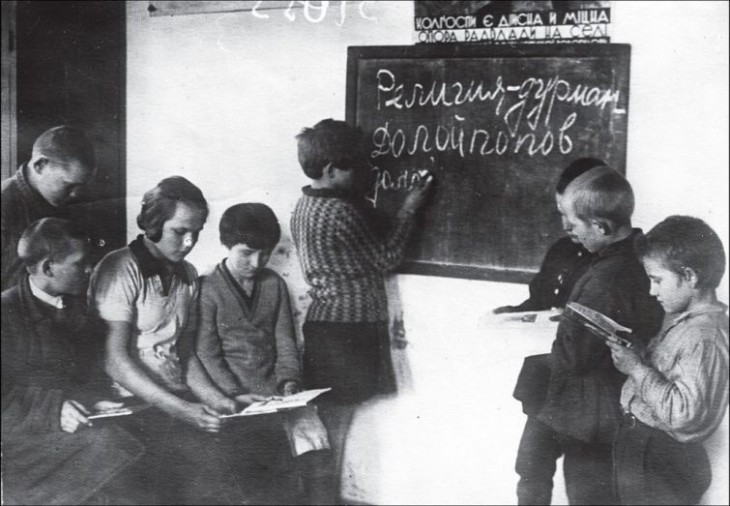
Pupils of a children's commune in Chuhuiv writing anti-religious slogans on a blackboard, 1931

In 1930 compulsory primary education in the Soviet Union was introduced by a decree of the Council of People's Commissars. After 1933, the policies of korenization were replaced with Russification, which became especially prominent in the educational sphere. The Soviet history course in schools was created on the base of Russian history courses from imperial times.

During the 1930s, numerous Ukrainian scientific and cultural activists were subjected to state-organized political repressions. More than half of the members of the Writers' Union of Ukraine were repressed on trumped-up charges between 1934 and 1938. Many were imprisoned in concentration camps and executed, while some, like Mykola Khvylyovy, committed suicide due to persecution by authorities.

Starting from the second half of 1920s Kyiv became a major centre of cinematography, with the local cinema studios producing several renowned films such as Arsenal and Earth by Alexander Dovzhenko. After a conflict with Mykola Skrypnyk, Dovzhenko moved to Moscow and received the protection of Stalin, producing propaganda movies for his regime. A significant development in Ukrainian arts was the school created by Mykhailo Boychuk, who was in 1936 arrested by the Soviet authorities and later executed. Despite repressions, the number of Ukrainian intelligentsia saw an increase during the first decades of Soviet rule.

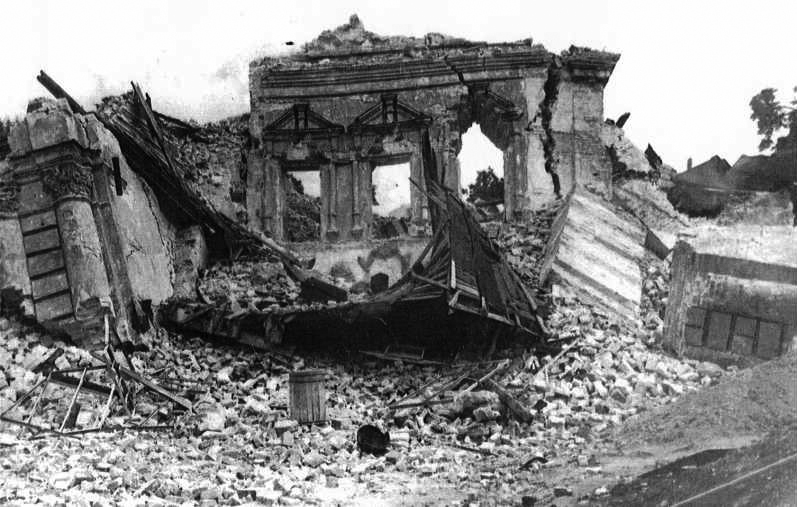
Ruins of St. Michael's Monastery in Kyiv after its demolition in August 1937

Many churches and synagogues were destroyed during the existence of the Ukrainian SSR. By 1937, only 850 Christian places of worship continued to function in the republic compared to approximately 10,000 less than a decade earlier. Many churches were closed and transformed into clubs, meanwhile the St. Sophia Cathedral and Monastery of the Caves in Kyiv were turned into museums of atheism. In 1930 the Ukrainian Autocephalous Orthodox Church was dissolved by authorities after accusations of nationalism. In 1937 St. Michael's Golden-Domed Monastery in Kyiv was demolished during construction works. Nevertheless, according to materials of a census performed during the same year, over 50% of Ukrainian SSR's population declared themselves to be religious.

During the Second World War, the Soviet regime toned down its propaganda of class struggle, and started appealing to heroic past of the Russians and other peoples of the USSR in fight against external enemies. Starting from the beginning of German invasion, Ukrainian historical figures such as Daniel of Galicia and Bohdan Khmelnytsky were lionized as great patriots and fighters against German aggressors, although neither of the two ever fought against Germany. This practice demonstrated the ability of Communism and Nationalism to coexist inside of a single system. In September 1943 Stalin agreed to restore the position of patriarch of the Russian Orthodox Church. In order to rehabilitate the popular image of the regime, several prominent cultural figures, such as Mykola Bazhan and Pavlo Tychyna, were appointed to serve in the government of Ukrainian SSR. Ukrainian historians and publishers evacuated from the warzone engaged in production of popular works and propaganda, promoting Ukrainian Soviet patriotism. In October 1943 Order of Bohdan Khmelnytsky was established, and the ancient city of Pereyaslav was renamed in honour of the hetman. At the same time, the official ideology continued to promote the image of Russians as the "elder brother".

Following the establishment of Soviet rule over Western Ukraine, the Stalinist regime took a decision to eliminate the Ukrainian Greek Catholic Church. In March 1946 a synod in Lviv proclaimed the abolition of the 1596 Union of Brest and declared the incorporation of Greek Catholics by the Russian Orthodox Church. After the murder of bishop Theodore Romzha in 1947, a similar operation was performed in respect to the Ruthenian Greek Catholic Church in Transcarpathia. As a result, by 1948 more than 62% of all Russian Orthodox parishes were located in Ukraine. Nevertheless, the closures of churches by the government continued, officially on the wishes of local population.

The postwar era saw a government-organized crackdown on some branches of science, most notably genetics, which was declared unscientific under the influence of Trofim Lysenko's ideas. Starting from 1946, Stalin's chief ideologist Andrey Zhdanov initiated a campaign against "bourgeois nationalism", which reached its apogee in 1951, when Pravda accused Volodymyr Sosyura's wartime poem Love Ukraine of "nationalism". Gradual rehabilitation of Ukrainian cultural figures who had fallen victim to the campaign started only after Stalin's death in 1953.

=== Khrushchev and Brezhnev periods ===
The liberalization of political life during the Khrushchev Thaw led to the spread of Western cultural influences in the Soviet Union. In Ukraine, translations of previously banned authors such as Albert Camus, Franz Kafka, Erich Maria Remarque and Ernest Hemingway became possible with the reestablishment of Vsesvit magazine in 1958. In 1959 students in Kyiv organized the performance of koliadky, traditional Ukrainian Christmas carols, and were soon permitted to create a cultural club under the aegis of local Komsomol. The club also engaged in social activities, among others demanding to establish a memorial to victims of Stalinist repression at Bykivnia. Similar clubs were established in other cities of Ukraine, contributing to the emergence of Sixtiers movement.

During the post-WW2 period, the Russification of ethnic Ukrainians, as well as the mass immigration of ethnic Russians, significantly changed the ethnic and linguistic composition of Ukraine's population. The change was especially evident in Donbas, where Ukrainian speakers became a minority.

Following a short period of cooperation with the Russian Orthodox Church, in 1958 Khrushchev's government announced the beginning of a new anti-religious campaign. By 1964, more than half of Ukraine's religious communities lost their churches, and two-thirds of all monasteries were shut down by authorities. Nevertheless, the vast majority of Ukrainian population in different parts of the republic continued to follow religious rites. In 1958 the theses published by the Central Committee of the Communist Party promoted the facultative status of Ukrainian language in schools with simultaneous compulsory teaching of Russian. This proposal produced a backlash among Ukraine's cultural elite. Nevertheless, between 1959 and 1966 the number of Russian-language schools in Ukrainian SSR increased, while the number of Ukrainian-language schools fell.

In Ukraine, the removal of Khrushchev resulted in the political rise of Petro Shelest, who was considered to be a Ukrainophile and worked to undo the Russificatory policies of his predecessor, promoting Ukrainian-language education, media and publishing. A loyal Communist by ideology, Shelest refused to recognize the elimination of national distinctions as a goal of Soviet Union's development, and promoted the notions of Soviet republics' sovereignty. Shelest's removal from the post of the First Secretary of the Communist Party of Ukraine in 1972 signified a decisive turn to policies of Russification, which were implemented by his successor Volodymyr Shcherbytsky. The fight against supposed "Ukrainian nationalism" frequently adopted the forms of hysterical accusations against Ukrainians following their national traditions, and Soviet officials would demonstratively use Russian during official events. Even the statue of Neptune in Lviv's Rynok Square had its trident removed in order not to produce unneeded associations.

By the mid-1980s, only every fifth student in Kyiv had Ukrainian as language of school education. Russian language dominated in pedagogical schools and in higher education. A significant affair in Ukrainian culture during the Brezhnev era was the campaign against Oles Honchar, whose 1968 novel The Cathedral was attacked for criticizing local Communist authorities' attitudes to cultural heritage. As a result, in 1971 Honchar was removed from his position as head of the Writers' Union of Ukraine. Other authors residing in Ukraine, among them Oles Berdnyk, Ivan Dziuba, Mykola Lukash, Lina Kostenko, Boris Chichibabin and Viktor Nekrasov also became victims of government persecution. The crackdown against Ukrainian literature stopped in 1979, after Pavlo Zahrebelnyi was appointed to lead the Writers' Union.

A highlight of the Brezhnev period was the emergence of Ukrainian poetic cinema represented by works of Sergei Parajanov, Volodymyr Denysenko, Ivan Mykolaichuk and Yuri Illenko. However, just like in case of literature, cinema of Ukraine during that time suffered from severe government pressure, which hindered its development. By the end of 1970s, the majority of films produced at Dovzhenko Film Studios in Kyiv were filmed in Russian, and Odessa Film Studios produced exclusively Russian-language movies. Foreign movies were dubbed exclusively in Russian. The early 1970s also saw a crackdown against the revival of Ukrainian folk songs, whose performers were blamed of "bourgeois nationalism". A significant cultural event of the Brezhnev era was the celebration of Kyiv's 1500th anniversary in 1982, which included the unveiling of several architectural monuments still defining the city's image: Ukrainian House (originally Lenin Museum), Hero City Obelisk in modern-day Halytska Square, Monument to the Founders of Kyiv and Arch of Freedom of the Ukrainian People (Arch of People's Friendship).

=== Final years of Soviet rule ===
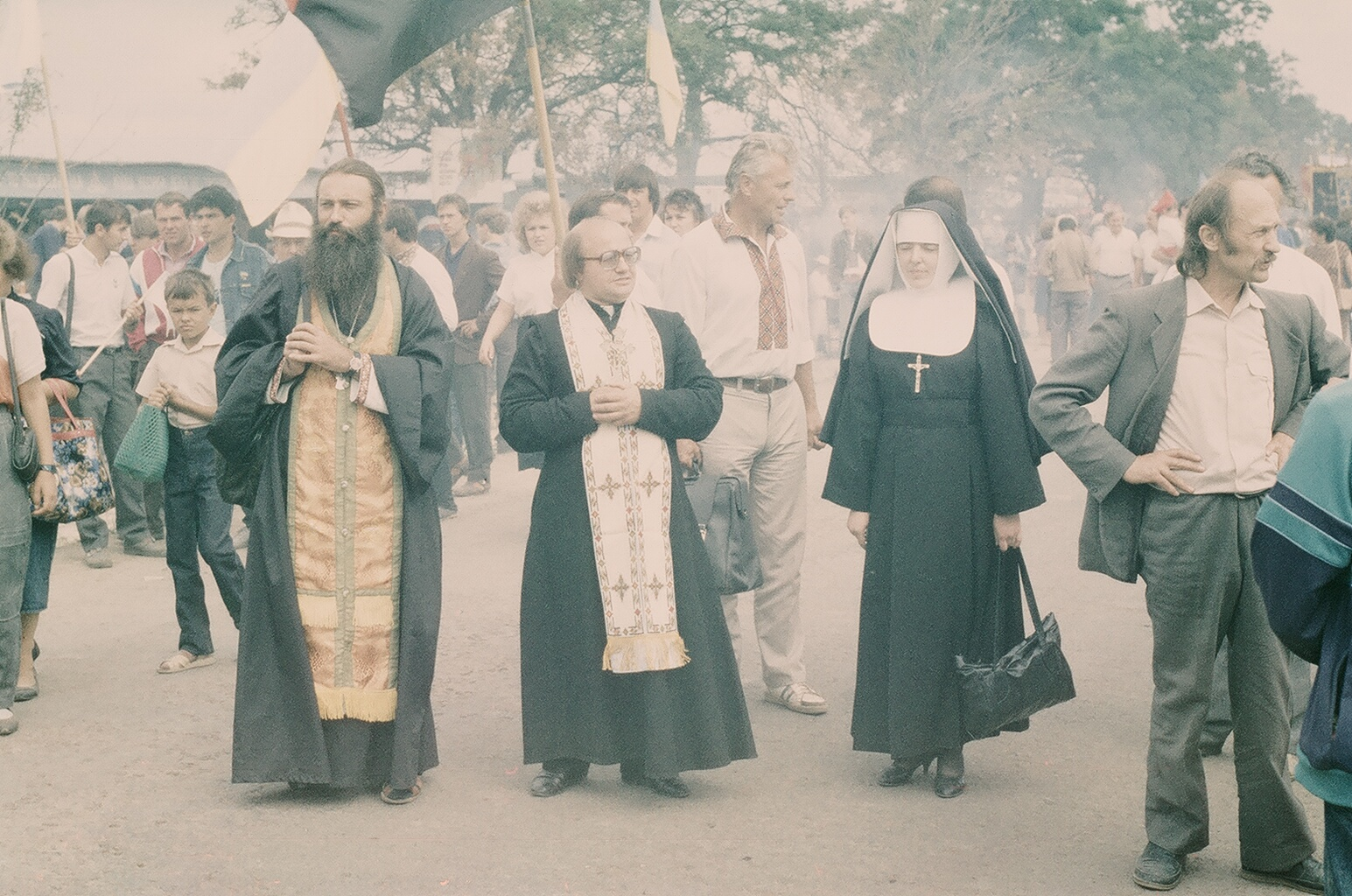
Members of Ukrainian clergy, including Greek Catholic priest Yaroslav Lesiv (in the middle) in 1990

The advent of Perestroika led to a spike in the Ukrainian national liberation movement, which was vividly demonstrated in the sphere of religion. Starting from 1987 numerous petitions were directed to authorities with demands to provide official recognition of the Ukrainian Greek Catholic Church following more than 40 years of persecution. To neuter these demands, in April 1988 Gorbachev ordered Patriarch Pimen I of Moscow to increase the number of Orthodox parishes in Western Ukraine and promote church publications in Ukrainian language. However, those measures had little effect on the Greek Catholic community. In May 1989 six bishops of the banned church organized a hunger strike in central Moscow, and in Western Ukraine a major action in support of religious freedom was organized on the initiative of cardinal Myroslav Ivan Lubachivsky. On 17 September 1989 calls for legalization of the Ukrainian Greek Catholic Church were issued by participants of a demonstration in memory of the 50th anniversary of the Soviet invasion, which was organized in Lviv. Answering to numerous telegrams he received from Ukraine, on 5 October 1989 pope John Paul II declared the official recognition of Ukrainian Greek Catholic Church by Soviet authorities to be a prerequisite for democratization in the USSR. On 23 January 1990 a council of Greek Catholic bishops in Lviv recognized the decision of the 1946 synod to be invalid and demanded full rehabilitation of the church and return of all of its properties. The victory of local Democratic Bloc representatives in elections to the Supreme Soviet of Ukraine made it possible to realize the council's demands, and Lviv's St. George's Cathedral returned to Greek Catholics. In March 1991 cardinal Lubachivsky returned from emigration.

Following the steps of Greek Catholics, in August 1989 the community of Sts. Peter and Paul Church in Lviv declared their refusal to subordinate itself to the Russian Orthodox Church and proclaimed its autocephaly. On 20 October a congress of clergymen declared the restoration of the Ukrainian Autocephalous Orthodox Church, and in June 1990 an all-Ukrainian synod elected Mstyslav Skrypnyk as its patriarch. In January 1990 a synod of the Russian Orthodox Church in Moscow approved the transformation of its parishes in Ukraine into a self-governed exarchate under the name of Ukrainian Orthodox Church (UOC). By early 1991, 10,810 religious communities were registered in Ukraine, with the biggest confessions being represented by UOC (5031 communities), UGCC (2001), Union of Evangelical Christians-Baptists (1127) and UAOC (939).

== Demographics ==
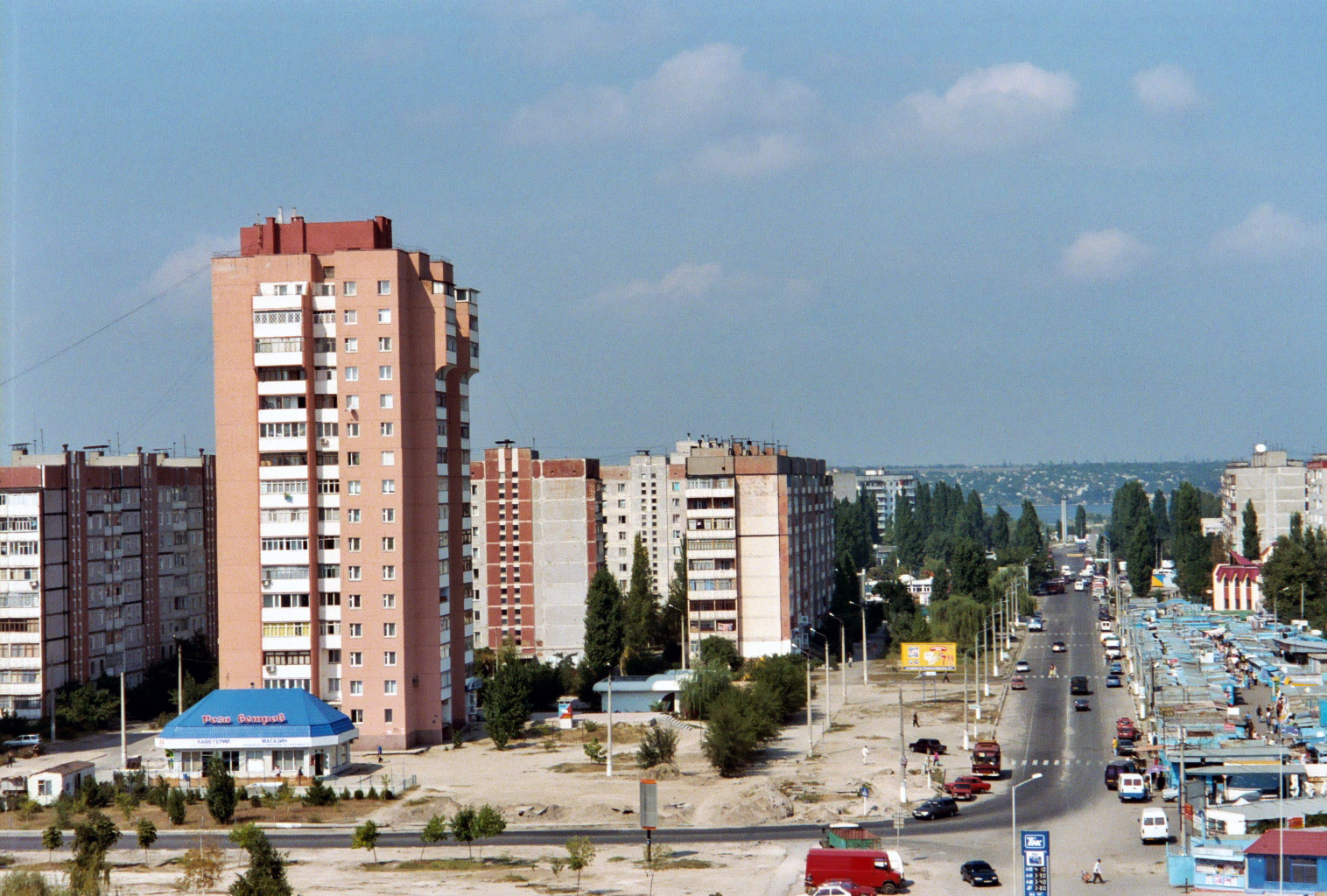
Microdistricts, such as this one in Mykolaiv, became common sights throughout the Ukrainian SSR's cities.

Between 1959 and 1989 Soviet Ukraine's population increased by 9,6 million, reaching the number of 51,7 million people. This made Ukraine Europe's sixth most populated country after Russia, Germany, Italy, Great Britain and France. However, the population growth gradually slowed down, and was to a large degree contributed to by migration from other parts of the USSR. Decreasing birth rates and increasing mortality were combined with an increase in average life expectancy, which led to the aging of population. Starting from late 1960s, rural areas of Ukraine started experiencing depopulation. The ethnic composition of Ukrainian SSR changed with time, with the percentage of ethnic Ukrainians decreasing amid simultaneous increase in the number of ethnic Russians. Immigration played a significant role in this process. This contributed to Russification, especially in eastern and southern parts of the country. Nevertheless, even Ukrainians who adopted Russian as main language tended to preserve their Ukrainian identity.

Urbanisation in post-Stalin Ukraine grew quickly; in 1959, only 25 cities in Ukraine had populations over one hundred thousand, by 1979 the number had grown to 49. During the same period, the growth of cities with a population over one million increased from one to five; Kiev alone nearly doubled its population, from 1.1 million in 1959 to 2.1 million in 1979. This proved a turning point in Ukrainian society: for the first time in Ukraine's history, the majority of ethnic Ukrainians lived in urban areas; 53 percent of the ethnic Ukrainian population did so in 1979. The majority worked in the non-agricultural sector, in 1970 31 percent of Ukrainians engaged in agriculture, in contrast, 63 percent of Ukrainians were industrial workers and white-collar staff. In 1959, 37 percent of Ukrainians lived in urban areas, in 1989 the proportion had increased to 60 percent. During the same period, the share of rural inhabitants decreased from half of the population to one-third.

== See also ==
- List of states and regions involved in the Russian Civil War
- Bibliography of the Russian Revolution and Civil War
- Bibliography of Ukrainian history
- Outline of the Russian Revolution and Civil War
