= Hirvepark meeting =

1987 anti-Soviet demonstration in Estonian SSR

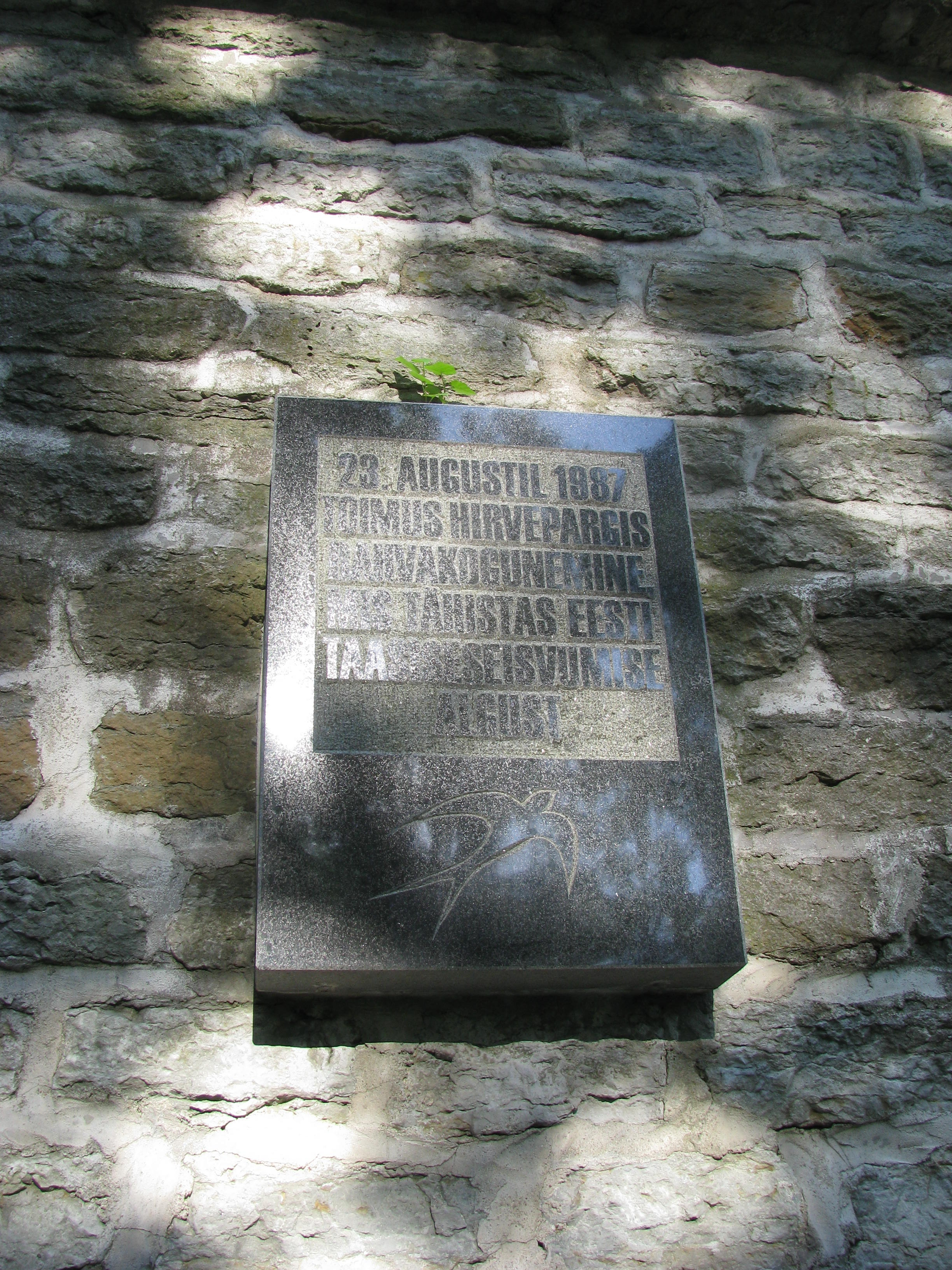
A plaque in Hirvepark erected to commemorate the demonstration

The Hirvepark meeting (Estonian: Hirvepargi miiting) was a political demonstration held in Hirvepark, Estonia on 23 August 1987, on the anniversary of the Molotov–Ribbentrop Pact. It was attended by an estimated 7,000 people, and was one of the first organized public demonstrations against the Estonian Communist Party. Participants demanded the public disclosure of the Molotov–Ribbentrop Pact and its secret protocols, along with the liquidation of the pact's consequences. The demonstration sparked a wave of anti-Soviet activity and mass protests in support of the restoration of Estonia's independence.

== The MRP-AEG ==
The leaders of the meeting were members of MRP-AEG, the Estonian Group on Publication of the Molotov–Ribbentrop Pact (Estonian: Molotov-Ribbentropi Pakti Avalikustamise Eesti Grupp), an organisation dedicated to publishing the Molotov–Ribbentrop Pact and its secret additional protocols. These included Tiit Madisson, Heiki Ahonen, Lagle Parek, and Erik Udam. The general public was notified of the meeting through the Voice of America and Radio Free Europe, as well as orally.

MRP-AEG also used the event to distribute the MRP-AEG Bulletin (Estonian: MRP-AEG Infobulletään), an underground self-printed bulletin that contained the organisation's statements and political opinions, reviews of demonstrations and pickets, authority-led actions and repressions, as well as thematic articles, historical reviews, and memoirs. Its self-publication meant only those who came to the publishers directly or through acquaintances could obtain the bulletin.

„Meie ei osanud midagi arvata, kas rahvas tuleb või ei, kas isegi sõbrad tulevad või ei, kõik oli lahtine.“

"We couldn't guess a thing - not if the public would come or not, or if even our friends would come or not. Everything was up in the air."

— Lagle Parek, the demonstration's organiser

== Events of the meeting ==
Initially, the demonstration was supposed to take place at the Town Hall Square (Estonian: Raekoja plats), but the city government issued a last-minute revocation of their permission given for the meeting. At the militia's request, the attendees moved on to Harjumäe, chanting slogans such as "publicise the Molotov–Ribbentrop conditions", "[the right of] self-determination for Baltic countries", "abolish the Molotov–Ribbentrop agreement", "Bring Stalinist executioners to justice", and "free Enn Tarto and Mart Niklus".

„See oli tõesti meeliülendav vaatepilt, kui terve Harju tänav oli inimestega täidetud! Harju tänava ääres oli vabaõhukohvik, külastajad vaatasid hämmelduses seda inimjõge. Juba olid väljas ka loosungid. Välgatasid plakatid sümboolikaga, kus olid võrdsustatud sirp ja vasar haakristiga.“

"It was a truly uplifting sight to see when the entire of Harju Street was filled with people! By the side of Harju street, there was an open-air cafe; the patrons just looked at this river of people in bewilderment. Already, [signs with] slogans were coming out. Posters flashed, depicting the hammer and sickle as equal to the swastika."

— Henno Arrak, an artist

A suitable place for the meeting was found on the steps of Hirvepark. In the demonstration's opening speech, the principal organiser, Tiit Madisson, spoke about the non-aggression pact signed between Germany and the Soviet Union almost 50 years ago, and its secretive additional protocols, which divided Eastern Europe into spheres of influence. Gorbachev's implementation of glasnost meant the number of Estonian human casualties caused by the pact's implementation had been publicised for the very first time, and the question of the restoration of Estonia's independence was raised.

Speakers included Heiki Ahonen, Erik Udam, Villu Rooda, Lagle Parek, Jüri Mikk, Roman Bode, and Kalju Mätik. There were also poetry readings from Merle Jääger and Raivo Raave, as well as one Platon Afanasjev, who claimed to be a functionary of Communist International; however, audience members deemed him to be too young to be part of the organisation, and he was consequently heckled off-stage. The crowd of now-several thousand participants sang "Our currents are free" (Estonian: 'Meil merevood on vabad', also known as "Jää vabaks, Eesti meri"), and over a hundred people followed Lagle Parek's plea to enroll in an organisation dedicated to remembering victims of Stalinism.

== Media coverage ==
Coverage from Estonian SSR media platforms was immediate and critical. The demonstration was referred to as foreign interference in the USSR's internal affairs, and the forging of fascists - in newspapers, tabloid-esque articles appeared, in which Madisson, Parek and Mikku were depicted as simple 'thieves', 'crooks', and provocateurs that were distorting history. Due to their participation in the meeting, many MPR initiators were subjected to consequences and repressions by the KGB. Following Hirvepark, Tiit Madisson was forced to emigrate to Sweden.

„Selle aktsiooniga püüdsid provokaatorid moonutada Eesti töötajate revolutsioonilist minevikku, heita sellele varju, mustata Nõukoguse rahvaste vennalikku ühtsust, diskrediteerida Nõukogude võimu.“

"With this action, the provocateurs attempted to distort the revolutionary past of Estonian workers and cast a shadow over it, to tarnish the fraternal unity of Soviet nations, and to discredit the power of the USSR."

— A message from ETA, the Estonian Telegraph Agency (Estonian: Eesti Telegraafi Agentuur) on 25th August 1987

„See spektaakel, mis mängiti nende poolt maha Nõukogude-vastase stsenaariumi järgi, tõi kahjuks kokku mõnisada uudishimulikku.“

"This spectacle, which played out on [the participants'] side as according to an anti-Soviet script, unfortunately brought together a few hundred curious witnesses."

— ETA's official announcement, broadcast on the news program 'Actual Camera' (Estonian: Aktuaalne kaamera) on the evening of the demonstration

== Outcomes ==
Ultimately, the demonstration gathered a crowd of around 7,000 participants, that neither the authorities nor the organisers could have expected. For almost half a century, all political initiatives in Estonia had been under the complete control of the Communist Party. The Hirvepark meeting was the first major public-initiated demonstration in which, under the conditions of perestroika and glasnost, authorities could not intervene in.

The Communist Party and KGB faced uncertainty and confusion in the new situation; between the Chernobyl disaster, Soviet-Afghan War, and Phosphorite War, glasnost had backfired in giving Estonians free speech, and effectively, the legal ability to dissent for the first time since USSR occupation. Independence and the Republic of Estonia's restoration were not directly demanded at the Hirvepark demonstration, but the organisers had hit a crucial point in their occupation - the disclosure of the Molotov–Ribbentrop Pact and its secret protocols meant the USSR would have to expose a historical lie, and demonstrate the illegitimacy of the Soviet Union. The Hirvepark meeting established legal emphasis, that prepared the restoration of the Republic of Estonia on the basis of legal continuity on August 20, 1991.

Estonian: „Repressioone me eriti ei kartnud, sest olime kindlad, et meid ei ole võimalik provotseerida ja muidu enam vägivald polnud mõeldav. Hirmu ei tundnud, aga meeletu rõõm oli.“

"We weren't really scared of repression, because we were sure that we couldn't be provoked, and that violence at this point wasn't even a thought. We didn't feel fear - just an overwhelming sense of joy."

— Lagle Parek, the demonstration's organiser
