= Monument of Lihula =

Monument in Estonia

Lihula Monument
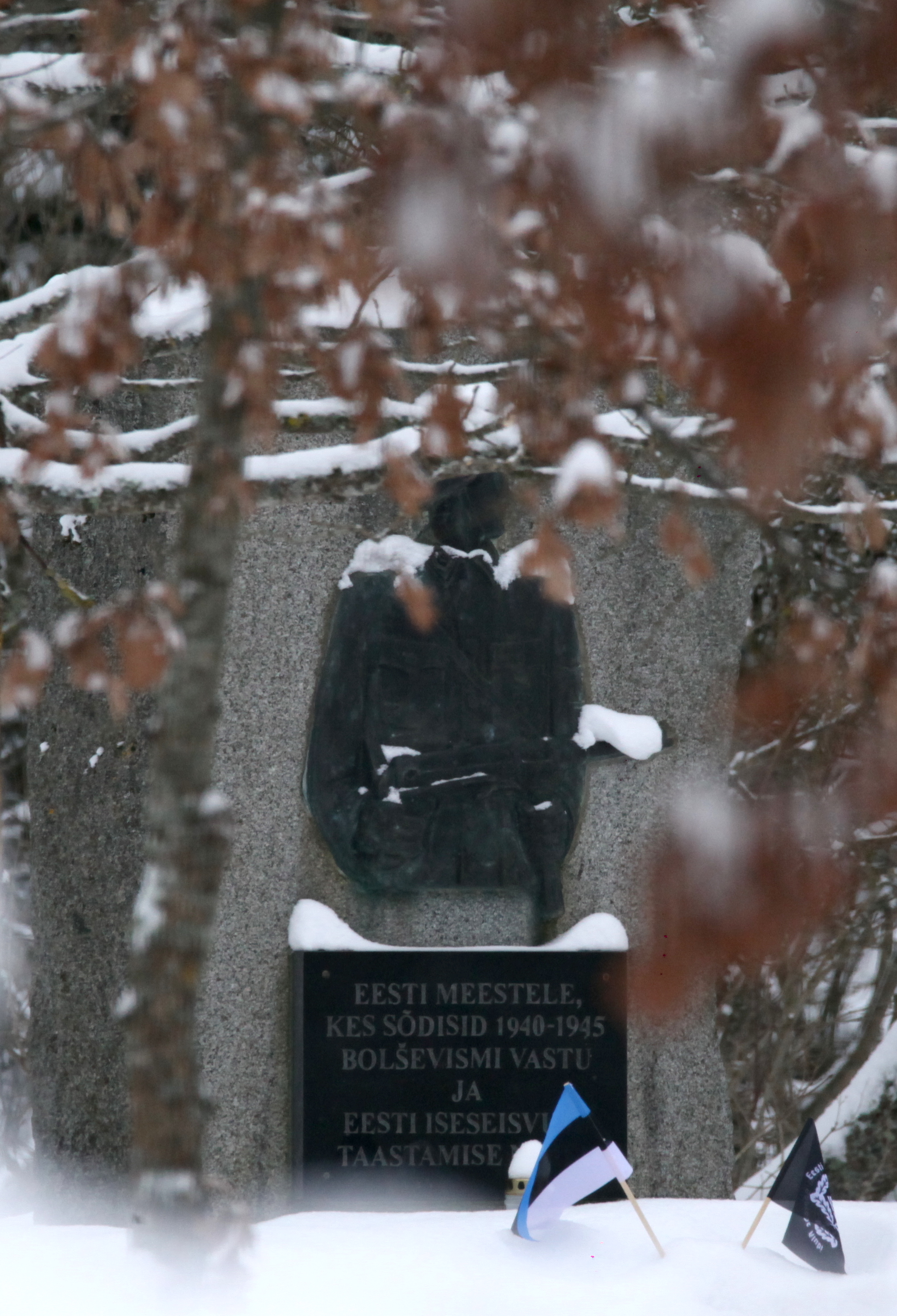
- The monument in 2021
- Interactive map of Lihula Monument
- Location: Lagedi, Estonia
- Coordinates: 59°23′23″N 24°56′27″E
- Established: 2005 (originally 2002)

Monument of Lihula is the colloquial name of a monument commemorating the Estonians who fought for Estonia against the Soviet Union in World War II, located in a privately owned museum in Lagedi, Estonia. The monument has been controversial due to, in part, its dedication to those who served in the German Wehrmacht and particularly in the Waffen-SS.

The monument has moved twice before ending up in the current location. It was originally unveiled in Pärnu on 2002, but taken down only nine days after Prime Minister Siim Kallas had condemned the statue. The statue was then located in Lihula in 2004, finally being unveiled in Lagedi on October 15, 2005.

== Description ==
The monument depicts a soldier in a military uniform, with a German helmet, an Estonian flag on the wrist and the "hand with a sword" symbol from the Cross of Liberty on the collar. There are no purely national-socialist symbols on the monument. It consists of a bronze bas-relief and a dedication tablet mounted on a vertical granite slab. The tablet reads: "To Estonian men who fought in 1940–1945 against Bolshevism and for the restoration of Estonian independence".

== Controversy ==
As the dedication included those who served in the Finnish Infantry Regiment 200, the Wehrmacht and particularly the Waffen SS, a number of organisations condemned it; most notably the Simon Wiesenthal Center issued an official protest stating that the monument glorifies "those who were willing to sacrifice their lives to help achieve the victory of Nazi Germany". Ilmar Haaviste, head of the Association of Estonian Veterans, who fought on the German side, says he does not regret taking the German uniform, because there was a "naïve" hope that somehow an independent Estonia could be salvaged. He thinks wearing a German uniform does not make you a fascist and that both regimes, Nazi and Soviet were equally evil – there was no difference between the two except that Stalin was more cunning. Tiit Madisson, the governor of the Lihula parish, said at the opening ceremony that Estonians' serving in German army chose the lesser evil. The monument caused concern among some Jewish officials and organisations, including the Chief Rabbi of Estonia and Russia’s Jewish Communities Federation.

=== Status of the Baltic Legions ===
Some Estonians joined these formations voluntarily, the majority were conscripted by Germans. The Nuremberg Trials, in declaring the SS a criminal organisation, explicitly excluded conscripts in the following terms:

Tribunal declares to be criminal within the meaning of the Charter the group composed of those persons who had been officially accepted as members of the SS as enumerated in the preceding paragraph who became or remained members of the organisation with knowledge that it was being used for the commission of acts declared criminal by Article 6 of the Charter or who were personally implicated as members of the organisation in the commission of such crimes, excluding, however, those who were drafted into membership by the State in such a way as to give them no choice in the matter, and who had committed no such crimes.

On April 13, 1950, a message from the U.S. High Commission in Germany (HICOG), signed by John J. McCloy to the Secretary of State, clarified the US position on the "Baltic Legions": they were not to be seen as "movements", "volunteer", or "SS". In short, they were not given the training, indoctrination, and induction normally given to SS members. Subsequently the US Displaced Persons Commission in September 1950 declared that:

The Baltic Waffen SS Units (Baltic Legions) are to be considered as separate and distinct in purpose, ideology, activities, and qualifications for membership from the German SS, and therefore the Commission holds them not to be a movement hostile to the Government of the United States.

=== Concerns about Nazi glorification ===
The monument has been regarded as controversial, including by former Prime Minister Juhan Parts, who labeled the Lihula Monument a "provocation". A number of rumours were circulated about the soldier depicted on the monument wearing Nazi symbolism, and thus constituting an attempt to glorify Nazism. As no such symbolism is on the bas-relief, sometimes the rumours have taken the form that these symbols were removed between the first and current installation.

A semiotic analysis by professor Peeter Torop of University of Tartu, ordered by Lihula police department to analyse the installation concluded that no Nazi or SS symbols whatsoever appear in the bas-relief. He pointed out the monument's composition was "unduly militaristic", concluding that the monument could be said to be "rude or controversial" given its resemblance to wartime mobilisation posters. He found no basis for the hypothesis that the installation of the monument would constitute an "incitement of social hatred". Under Estonian law, such incitement is a crime punishable by a fine or imprisonment of up to three years. In any case, short of recasting, it would be very hard to modify a bronze-cast statue.

== Moving the monument ==
In 2004, shortly after it was opened, the Estonian Government opposed the unveiling of the monument and ultimately ordered it to be removed.

The crane which arrived to remove the monument from Lihula could not enter the cemetery because of a crowd of protesting people. Riot police were called in, but as they arrived, locals started to throw stones at them and at the driver of the crane. After a fight between the crowd and the police, the people were driven back using teargas, and some policemen were treated for minor wounds in a hospital.

After the removal of the monument, it was subsequently placed on October 15, 2005 on grounds of the privately owned Museum of Fight for Estonia's Freedom in Lagedi near Tallinn. The monument has not been moved again.

The Conservative People's Party of Estonia have declared that they want to move the statue back to Lihula.

== See also ==
- Bronze Soldier of Tallinn, another controversial monument in Estonia.
