= Vasyl Stus =

Ukrainian poet and dissident

Hero of Ukraine Vasyl Stus
- Василь Стус
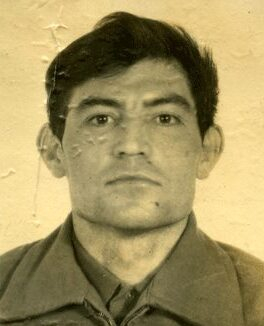
- Stus after his first arrest in 1972
- Born: 6 January 1938; Rakhnivka, Ukrainian SSR, Soviet Union
- Died: 4 September 1985 (aged 47); Perm-36, Kuchino, Russian SFSR, Soviet Union
- Citizenship: Soviet (until 1978) stateless (after 1978)
- Education: Donetsk National University
- Occupation: poet
- Known for: poems, human rights activism with participation in the Ukrainian Helsinki Group
- Movement: Sixtiers, Soviet dissidents
- Spouse: Valentyna Popeliukh (m. 1965)
- Children: 1 (Dmytro)
- Awards: Antonovych Prize; Hero of Ukraine (posthumously); Order of Prince Yaroslav the Wise, 5th class (posthumously); Shevchenko National Prize (posthumously)

Signature
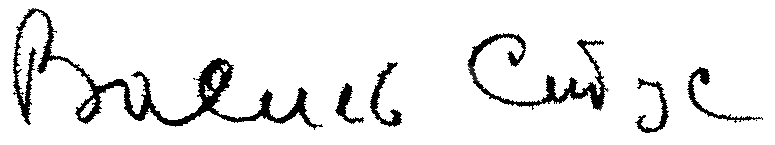

Vasyl Semenovych Stus (Ukrainian: Василь Семенович Стус; 6 January 1938 – 4 September 1985) was a Ukrainian poet, translator, literary critic, journalist, and an active member of the Ukrainian dissident movement. For his political convictions, his works were banned by the Soviet regime and he spent 13 years in detention until his death in Perm-36—then a Soviet forced labor camp for political prisoners, subsequently The Museum of the History of Political Repression—after having declared a hunger strike on 4 September 1985. On 26 November 2005, the Ukrainian president Viktor Yushchenko posthumously awarded him the highest national title: Hero of Ukraine. Stus is widely regarded as one of Ukraine's foremost poets.

== Biography ==
=== Early life ===
Vasyl Semenovych Stus was born on 6 January 1938 in the village of Rakhnivka, in Podolia (in the west of the Ukrainian Soviet Socialist Republic at the time) as the fourth and youngest child in a family of peasants. Prior to Vasyl's birth, the Stus family had, along with other peasant families throughout Ukraine, experienced the Soviet famine of 1930–1933. As landed peasants (kurkuls), the Stus family was subjected to local harassment and encouraged to join the kolkhoz in Rakhnivka, which they eventually did. In 1937, however, Stus's father, Semen, was given an offer to move to the Donbas, where there was a shortage of factory workers. After Vasyl's birth, Semen was joined by his wife Yilyna and their children, who moved to Stalino (now Donetsk), with the rigid, patriarchal social structure of rural Ukraine further encouraging the family's decision to move. Vasyl, however, did not initially join his parents and siblings, living in Rakhnivka with his grandparents as a child. Two years after his birth, Vasyl joined the rest of his family in Stalino.

In Stalino, Stus received a Russian-medium education. His knowledge of Ukrainian primarily came from Ukrainian folk music, which he learned from his mother. According to literary historian Georges Nivat, Stus displayed significant aptitude in school, but his educational prospects were hampered by his family background, and he was barred from entering the faculty of journalism at Taras Shevchenko Kyiv State University in 1954. He instead studied at the Stalino Pedagogical Institute (now Donetsk National University), where he found a freer political climate. After graduating, he served in the Soviet Army for two years. In 1961, Stus was first published in the Literaturna Ukraina literary magazine.

After his military service, Stus worked as an editor for the newspaper Sotsialistychnyi Donbas (Socialist Donbas) between 1960 and 1963. In 1963, he entered a doctoral program at the Shevchenko Institute of Literature of Ukrainian Academy of Sciences in Kyiv. At the same time, he published his selected poetry.

In 1965, Stus married Valentyna Popeliukh; his son, Dmytro was born in 1966.

=== Dissident activities and first arrest ===
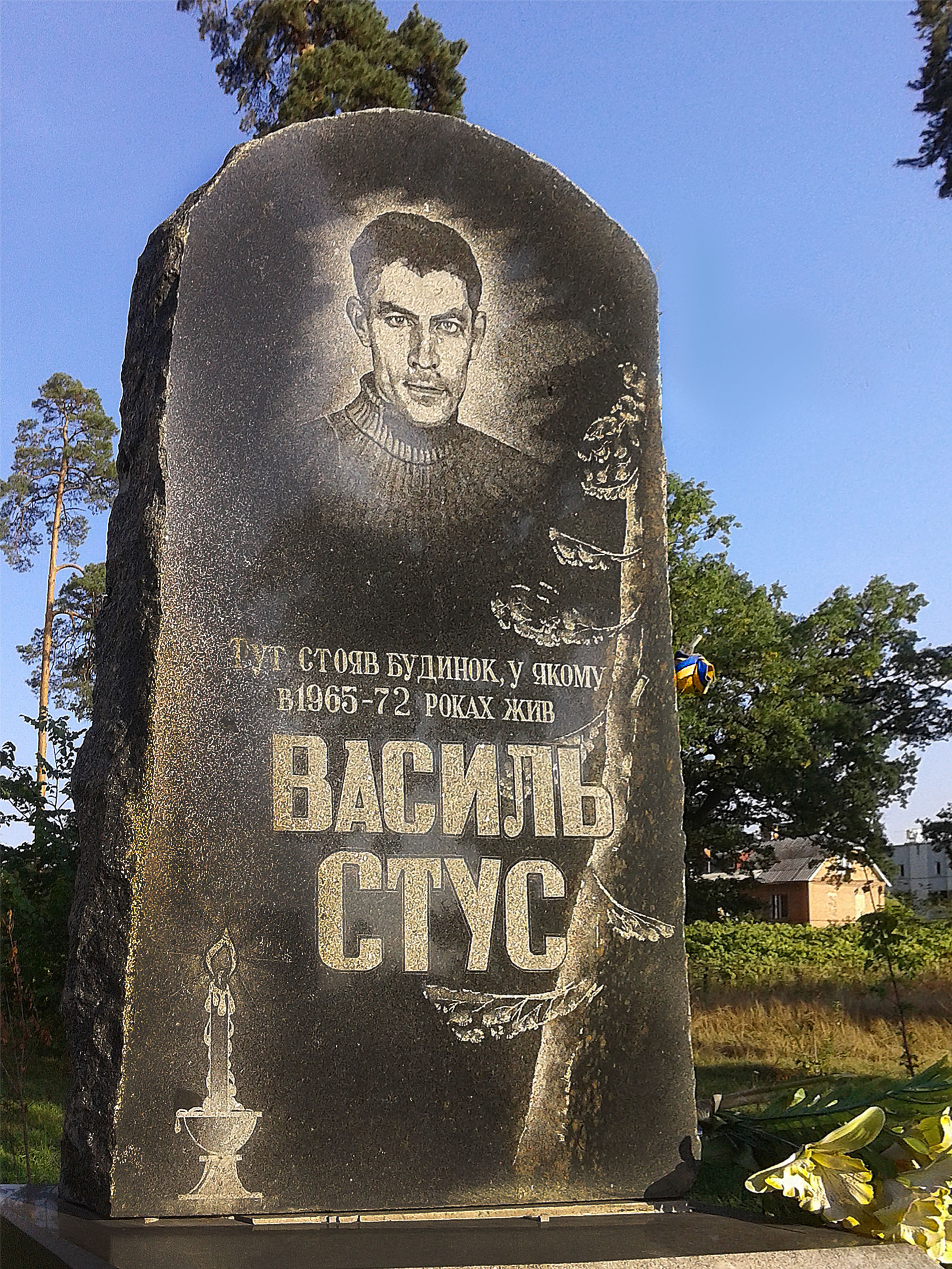
Monument on the site of a house in which Stus lived from 1965 to 1972

On 4 September 1965, during the premiere of Sergei Parajanov's film Shadows of Forgotten Ancestors in Kyiv's Ukrayina cinema, Vasyl Stus took part in a protest against the arrests of Ukrainian intelligentsia. As a result, he was expelled from the Institute on September 30 and later lost his job at the State Historical Archive. After that, he worked on a building site, a fireman, and an engineer, continuing his intensive work on poetry. In 1965, he submitted his first book Circulation (Круговерть) to a publisher, but it was rejected due to its discrepancy with Soviet ideology and artistic style. His next book of poetry Winter Trees (Зимові дерева) was also rejected, regardless of positive reviews from the poet Ivan Drach and the critic Eugen Adelgejm. In 1970, the book was published in Belgium.

On 12 January 1972, Stus was arrested for "anti-Soviet agitation and propaganda". His essay "Fenomen doby (skhodzhennia na Holhofu slavy)" (A Phenomenon of the Times (Ascending the Golgotha of Fame)), dedicated to Pavlo Tychyna, was used as the main evidence at his trial. He served a five-year sentence in a labor camp, and two-years in exile in Magadan Oblast.

Even in prison, Stus continued to write poetry, sending a handwritten book of verse to fellow dissident Nadiya Svitlychna. In 1978 the poet publicly renounced Soviet citizenship, claiming that being a citizen of the USSR equalled to slavery. In August 1979, having finished his sentence, Stus returned to Kyiv and worked in a foundry. He spoke out in defense of members of the Ukrainian Helsinki group (UHG). Stus himself joined the UHG in October 1979.

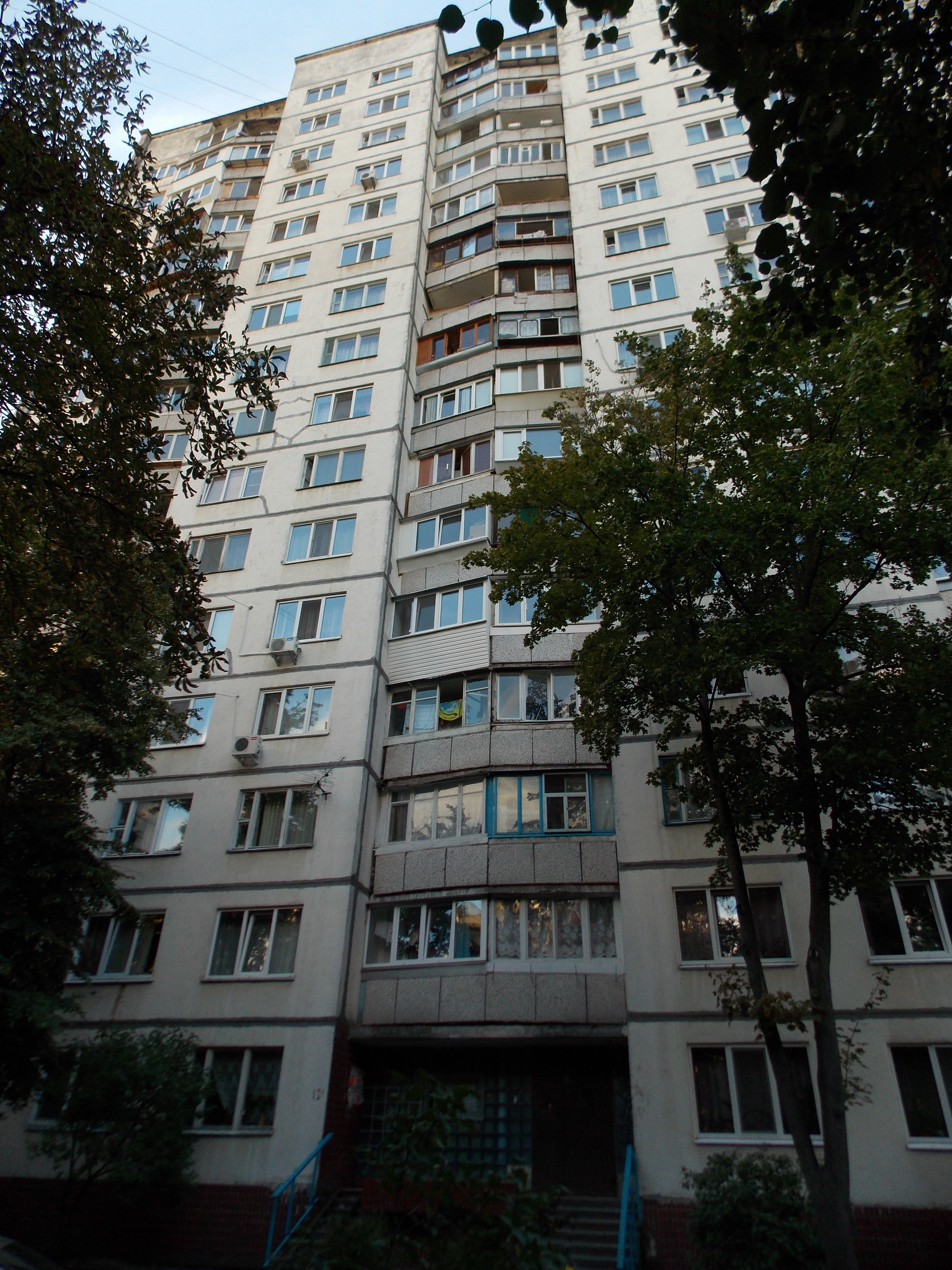
The house in Chornobylska street, Kyiv, where Stus lived in 1979–1980

"In Kyiv I learned that people close to the Helsinki Group were being repressed in the most flagrant manner. This at least had been the case in the trials of Ovsiyenko, Horbal, Lytvyn, and they were soon to deal similarly with Chornovil and Rozumny. I didn’t want that kind of Kyiv. Seeing that the Group had been left rudderless, I joined it because I couldn’t do otherwise … When life is taken away, I had no need of pitiful crumbs. Psychologically I understood that the prison gates had already opened for me and that any day now they would close behind me – and close for a long time. But what was I supposed to do? Ukrainians were not able to leave the country, and anyway I didn’t particularly want to go beyond those borders since who then, here, in Great Ukraine, would become the voice of indignation and protest? This was my fate, and you don’t choose your fate. You accept it, whatever that fate may be. And when you don’t accept it, it takes you by force … However I had no intention of bowing my head down, whatever happened. Behind me was Ukraine, my oppressed people, whose honour I had to defend or perish". ("Z tabornoho zoshyta" ["From the camp notebook"], 1983).

=== Second arrest and trial ===
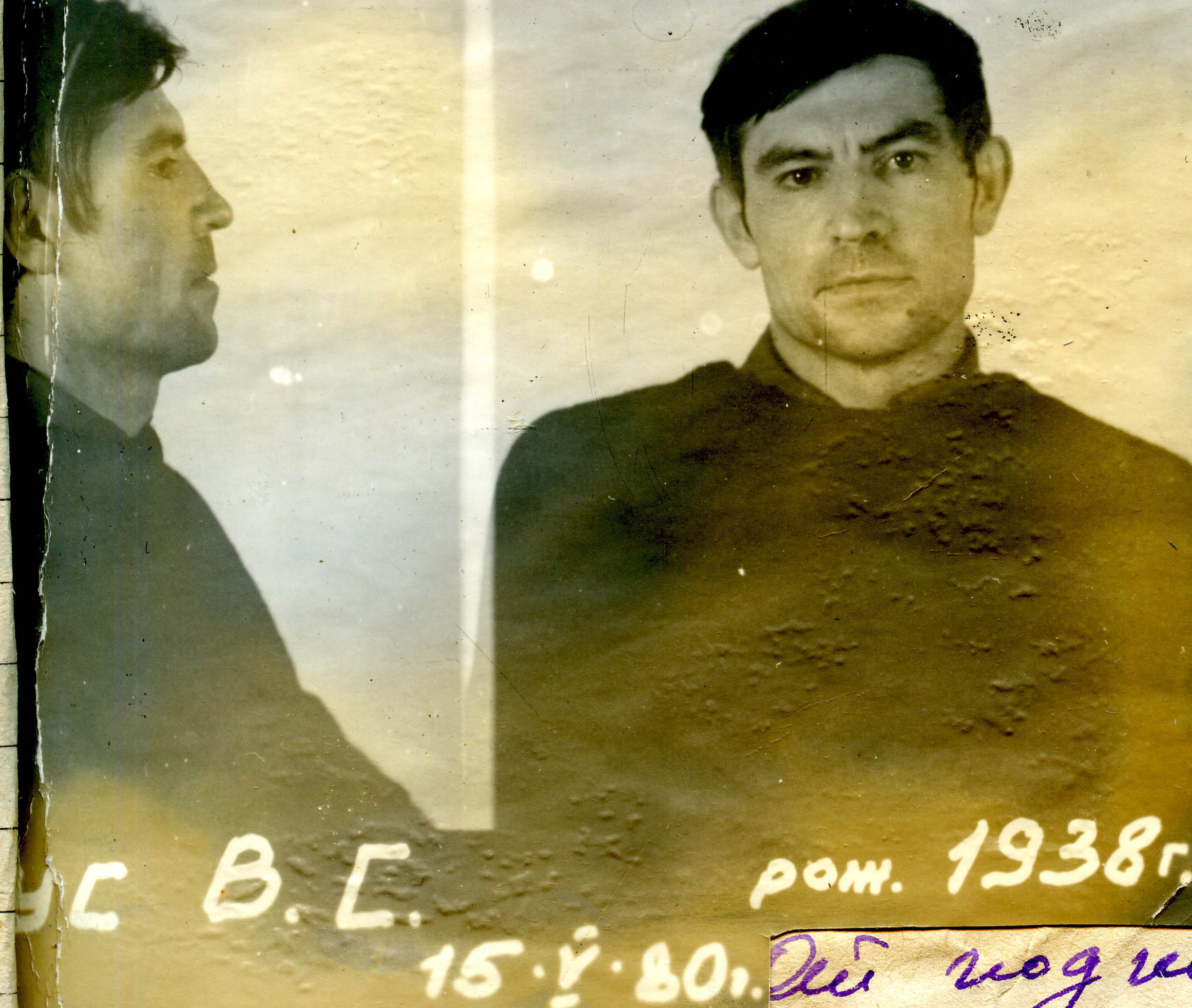
KGB photo of Stus after his second arrest, 1980

On 14 May 1980, prior to the 1980 Olympic Games in Moscow, he was arrested and received a 10-year sentence for "anti-Soviet activity". Viktor Medvedchuk, who was later influential in Ukrainian politics, defended Stus during this trial in 1980. In the closing speech from the defence Medvedchuk stated all of Stus' crimes deserved punishment; however, he also told the court that the defendant fulfilled his daily norm at the factory where he worked at the time, despite serious stomach problems. Stus' requests to get another public defender were dismissed by the court.

In a 2018 interview with The Independent dissident Yevhen Sverstiuk recalled: "When Stus met with his appointed lawyer, he immediately felt that Medvedchuk was a man of the Komsomol-aggressive type, that he did not protect him, did not want to understand him and, in fact, was not interested in his case." Medvedchuk claimed he could not have operated differently: "Stus denounced the Soviet government, and didn’t consider it to be legitimate. Everyone decides their own fate. Stus admitted he agitated against the Soviet government. He was found guilty by the laws of the time. When the laws changed, the case was dropped. Unfortunately, he died."

=== Final imprisonment ===
In November 1980 Stus was transferred to a Soviet forced labor camp for political prisoners at Perm-36 near the village of Kuchino, Perm Oblast, Russian SFSR. According to his cellmate Vasyl Ovsiyenko, the camp functioned de-facto as a maximum security prison, surrounded by an electric fence and a 21-meter-wide safety zone; the inmates were forced to work in the prison building, only being allowed to spend one hour a day in a court measuring 2 to 3 meters, covered with barbed wire. Every prisoner was permitted to keep a maximum of 5 books in own cell, and inmates were regularly searched by prison guards, who forced them to undress upon leaving their cells. Violations of camp rules could be punished by up to 5 years additional sentence. As an "especially dangerous recidivist", Stus was allowed to send one letter per month to his family, but his writings were strictly censored by authorities due to being written in the Ukrainian language. He was legally permitted to be visited by his family once a year, but in reality only one visit took place, as Stus refused to undergo the humiliating search procedure for a second time. Despite this, Stus used his time in imprisonment to receive French lessons from his cellmate Mart Niklus.

On Stus's birthday in early 1983, his cell was searched, with handwritten notes being confiscated by prison guards. As a result of his protests, in February 1983 Stus was put into solitary confinement for one year. During that time, he continued to write, creating over 40 poems and translating 11 of Rilke's elegies, which he put into a notebook. Although most of Stus's works created in prison were destroyed by camp authorities, a small book written by him was transferred outside of the prison walls by fellow inmate Balys Gajauskas and published in the West under the title From the Camp Notebook (З таборового зошита). According to Ovsiyenko, the appearance of that publication could have eventually cost the imprisoned poet his life.

Stus's imprisonment eventually gained publicity abroad, and in December 1984 German authors Heinrich Böll, Siegfried Lenz and Hans Werner Richter sent a telegram to Soviet general secretary Konstantin Chernenko, expressing their concern about Stus's health. However, no answer to their appeal was issued by Soviet authorities. Around the same time, a committee lobbying for Stus to be awarded with the Nobel Prize in Literature was established in Toronto under the leadership of Jaroslav Rudnyckyj.

=== Death and funeral ===
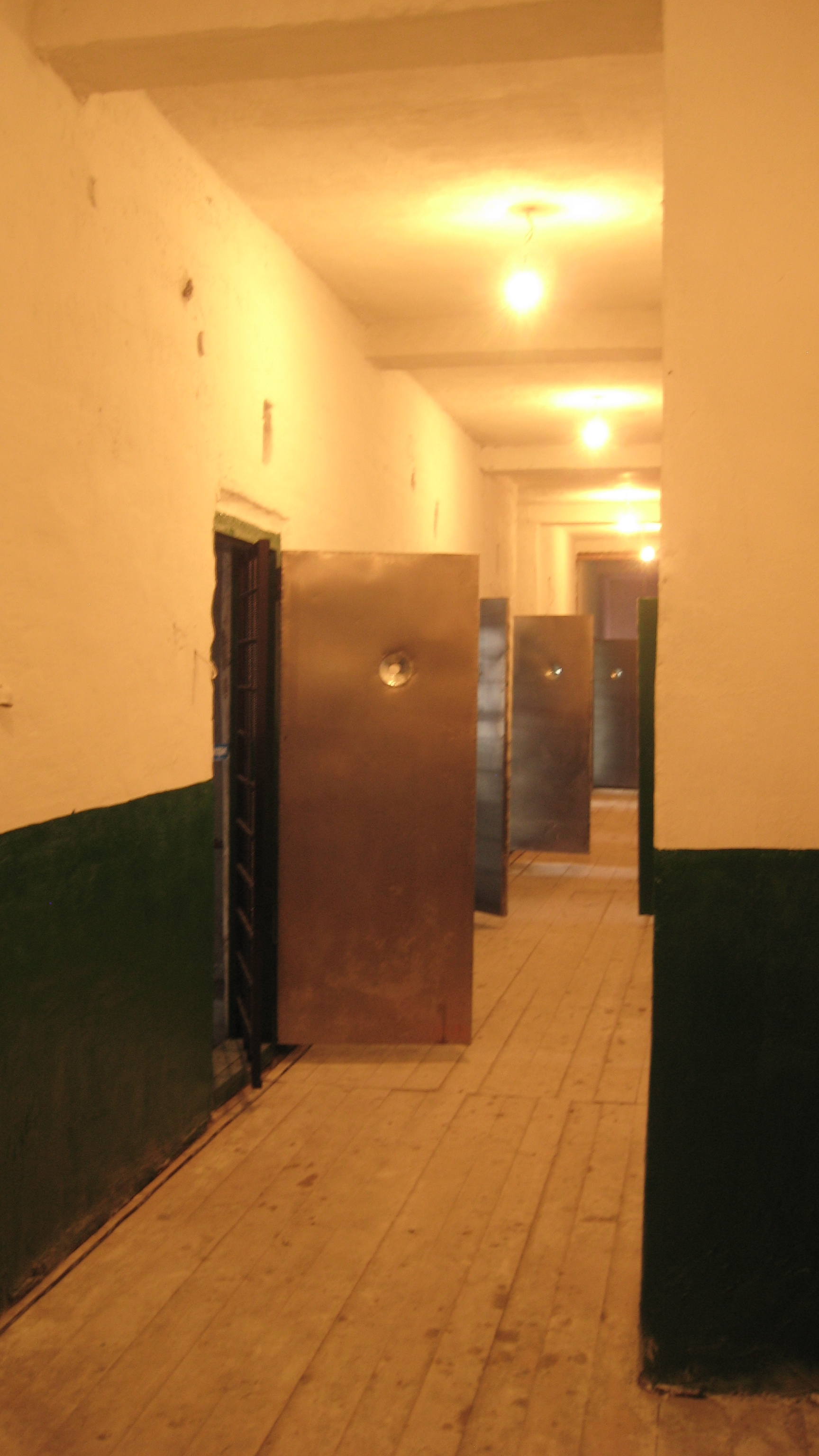
The prison cell at Perm-36 where Stus died on 4 September 1985

Stus spent the summer of 1985 in one cell with Russian writer Leonid Borodin. During that time he was repeatedly put into solitary confinement on accusations of various violations. As a sign of protest, on 27 August Stus declared a hunger strike. According to fellow inmates, on the day before his death the poet complained of heart problems and asked for a doctor. Stus died in his cell in the night from 3 to 4 September 1985. The immediate cause of his death has never been cleared. According to the official version, the poet died of heart disease. Fellow prisoner Danylo Shumuk reported that the commandant, Major Zhuravkov, committed suicide after the death of Stus. In total, eight out of 56 inmates kept in the Kuchino camp between 1980 and 1987 died during imprisonment, including four members of the Ukrainian Helsinki Group.

Camp authorities refused to transfer Stus's body to his relatives until the end of his term, and the poet was initially buried at the prison cemetery near the village of Borisovo. Only in summer 1989 was permission provided to Dmytro Stus to bring his father's remains to Kyiv, but bureaucratic hurdles forced the reburial to be postponed. Finally, on 19 November 1989 the remains of Vasyl Stus and two other Ukrainian political prisoners, Oleksa Tykhy and Yury Lytvyn, were brought back to Kyiv. After a memorial service at the Saint Sophia Cathedral, they were reburied at the Baikove Cemetery in a ceremony attended by more than 30,000 people. Mykhailo Horyn, Ivan Drach, Viacheslav Chornovil and Levko Lukianenko gave speeches over the graves. The funeral was ignored by most of the Soviet Ukrainian press, with only one article dedicating the event appearing in the newspaper Literaturna Ukraina.

In August 1990 the Supreme Court of the Soviet Union canceled Stus' verdict and the case was closed due to lack of evidence.

== Legacy ==
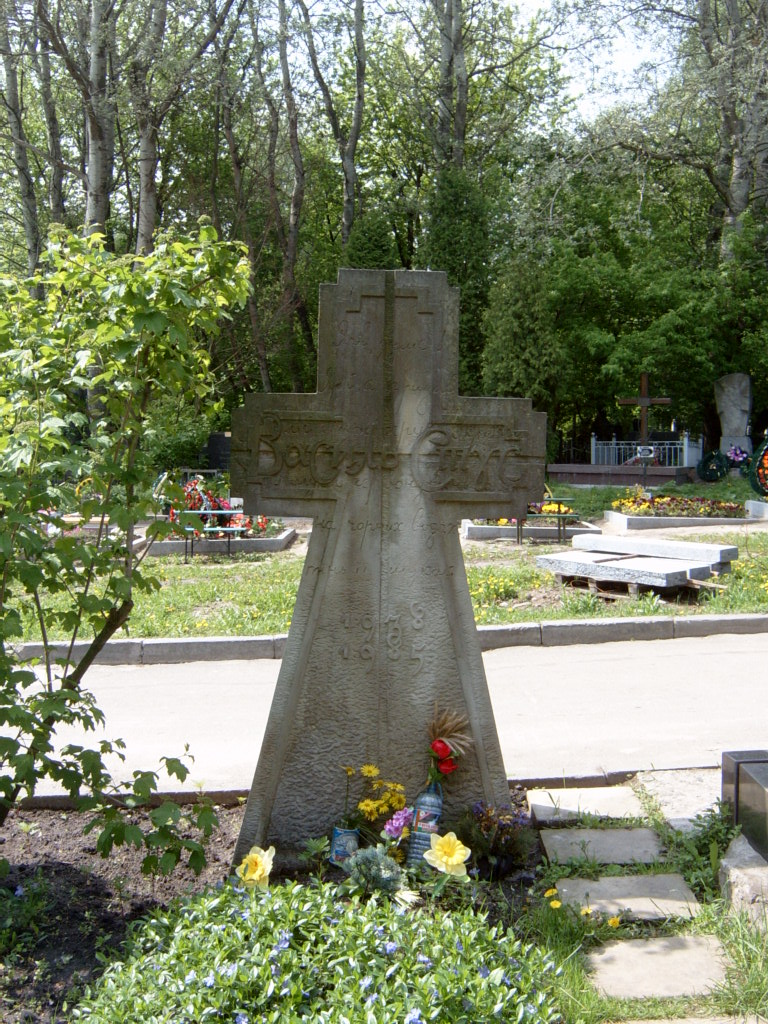
Grave of Vasyl Stus

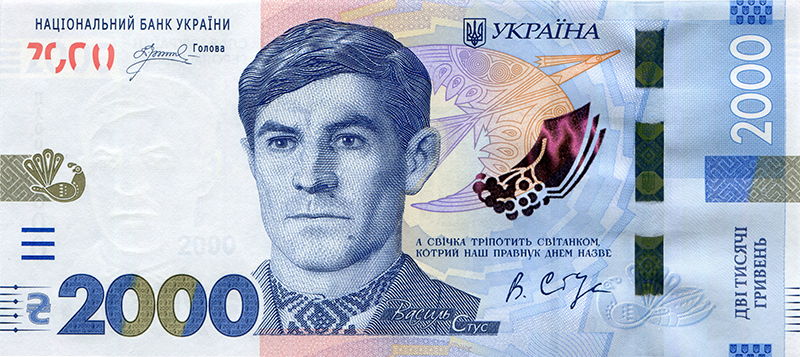
2,000 hryvnia banknote (Ukraine's largest) depicting Vasyl Stus

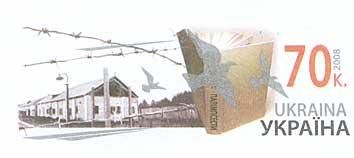
Commemorative stamp "70th Birth Anniversary of Vasil Stus".

In 1985, an international committee of scholars, writers, and poets nominated Stus for the 1986 Nobel Prize in Literature, but he died before the nomination materialized.

In January 1989, the first non-governmental Vasyl Stus Prizes were awarded for "talent and courage". This Prize was set up by the Ukrainian Association of the Independent Creative Intelligentsia, and is awarded every year on the poet's date of birth in Lviv. In 1992 a documentary film about Stus was presented. In 1993 Stus was posthumously awarded the Taras Shevchenko State Prize for Literature.

On 8 January 2008, the National Bank of Ukraine issued a commemorative coin dedicated to Vasyl Stus and on 25 January 2008 Ukrposhta issued a stamp in his memory.

In December 2008, a group of current and former students of the Donetsk National University sent an appeal to the Minister of Education, Ivan Vakarchuk, asking that the university be named after one of its alumni, Vasyl Stus. The Minister supported the initiative and approached the Rector of the university with a request to discuss the issue among staff and at the academic council. On February 17, 2009 62 out of 63 members of the university's academic council voted against renaming the university to Vasyl Stus or Volodomyr Degtyaryov (61 voted against this), 63 voted for not changing the name of the institute. On February 13, 2009, representatives of the university's students voted in the same fashion. The Donetsk National University, relocated to Vinnytsia due to the War in Donbas, was eventually renamed after Stus on 10 June 2016. The new name was approved by 75 votes out of 105 of the university's academic council.

After it was taken over by the pro-Russian rebels during the war in Donbas, the university building in Donetsk removed its commemorative plaque of Stus in 2015.

Stus is highly regarded among intellectuals in Ukraine.

Dozens of streets all over Ukraine are named in Vasyl Stus's honor, and the Kyiv Metro station Ploshcha Lva Tolstoho was voted to be renamed after him in a poll taken during the 2022 Russian invasion of Ukraine.

In October 2020, a Ukrainian court banned the distribution of Vakhtang Kipiani's book, The Case of Vasyl Stus, following a complaint by Viktor Medvedchuk, Stus's court appointed lawyer.

In March 2021, the Court of Appeal of Kyiv overturned the decision of the court of first instance to ban the publication and almost completely satisfied the complaint of the Vivat publishing house and the author of the book Vakhtang Kipiani. The first-instance court's ban on the distribution of the book and the use of Medvedchuk's name was also lifted. The publishing house announced its readiness to print a new edition of the book. Medvedchuk was fined 140,000 hryvnias as compensation for the publishing house's costs for handling the case. Medvedchuk did not appeal this court decision within the prescribed period, and thus it is considered final and entered into legal force.

In July 2026, the National Bank of Ukraine announced it will introduce a new 2,000-hryvnia banknote featuring the portrait of Vasyl Stus, which went into circulation on 4 September 2026.

== Awards ==
- 1982 – Antonovych prize
- 1991 – Taras Shevchenko State Prize of Ukraine for the poetry book "Doroha boliu" (Ukrainian: Дорога болю, lit. 'The Road of Pain') published in 1990
- 1997 – Order of Prince Yaroslav the Wise IV degree, presented by Ukrainian President Kuchma
- 2005 – Hero of Ukraine Award, presented by Ukrainian President Yushchenko

== Bibliography ==
=== Poetry Collections ===
- "Kruhovert" (Круговерть) (1965)
- "Zymovi Dereva" (Зимові Дерева) (1970)
- "Veselyi Tsvyntar" (Веселий Цвинтар) (1971)
- "Palimpsesty" (Палімпсести) (1971–1977, published 1986) – the fifth collection of Stus's poetry. Released in New York in 1986 after the death of the author.

== Poetry in English translations ==
- "The Lord Has Started Being Born Within Me" in Poetry London, Spring 2022, Issue 101. Translated by Alan Zhukovski.
- "A Stranger Lives My Life and Wears My Body" in Poetry International. Translated by Alan Zhukovski.
- "This Pain Is Like the Wine of Dying Throes" in The London Magazine, February/March 2019. Translated by Alan Zhukovski.
- "You're still alive. You’re at the very bottom…" in The Poetry Review, Vol. 112, No. 4, Winter 2022. Translated by Alan Zhukovski.
- "I cross the edge..." in Ukrainian Literature. A Journal of Translations, Volume 4, 2014. Translated by Artem Pulemotov.
- "So many words; they are like crippled ghosts!" in World Literature Today, March 16, 2022. Translated by Artem Pulemotov.
- "I wandered through the city of my youth..." and "One-thousand-year-old Kyiv" in Apofenie. Translated by Bohdan Tokarsky and Uilleam Blacker.
- "Here's the Sun for You" in Asymptote, June 6, 2023. Translated by Bohdan Tokarsky and Nina Murray.
