= Baltic Appeal =

Public letter to claim disclosing of Molotov-Ribbentrop pact

The Baltic Appeal (Estonian: Balti apell, Latvian: Baltijas harta or Baltiešu memorands, Lithuanian: 45 pabaltijiečių memorandumas) was a public letter to the secretary-general of the United Nations, Soviet Union, East and West Germany, and signatories of the Atlantic Charter by 48 (45 listed below) Estonian, Latvian and Lithuanian citizens. Sent on 23 August 1979, the 40th anniversary of the Molotov–Ribbentrop pact, the appeal demanded public disclosure of the pact and its secret protocols, annulment of the pact ab initio, and restoration of the independence of the Baltic states, then occupied by the Soviet Union.

The appeal, including signatures, was published in the Hearings Before the Commission on Security and Cooperation in Europe, Vol. XIII, 96th Congress, 2nd session, pp. 90–94, and in the Congressional Record, September 28, 1979, pp. S13722-23. It constituted the basis for the European Parliament's resolution of 13 January 1983 in support of its demands. In Soviet-controlled territory, it was widespread through samizdat.

This appeal was also supported by Andrei Sakharov and eleven Moscow-based human rights activists: Yelena Bonner, Sophia Kalistratova, Malva Landa, Victor Nekipelov, Tatyana Osipova, Ivan Kovalyov, Leonard Ternovsky, Irina Zholkovskaya, Tatyana Velikanova, Alexander Lavut, and Yury Belov. Source: Chronicle of Current Events, Issue 54 (1980).

Signatories:

- Romas Andrijauskas
- Stase Andrijauskiene
- Alfonsas Andriukaitis
- Vytautas Bastys
- Vytautas Bogušis
- Vladas Bobinas
- Romas Vitkevičius
- Jonas Volungevičius
- Jonas Dambrauskas
- Romas Eišvydas
- Rimas Žukovskas
- Ivars Žukovskis
- Alfrēds Zaideks
- Juris Ziemelis
- Liutauras Kazakevičius
- Leonas Laurinskas
- Valdis Larius
- Algirdas Mocius
- Mart-Olav Niklus
- Napoleonas Norkūnas
- Uldis Ofkants
- Sigitas Paulavičius
- Angele Paškauskiene
- Jonas Pratusevičius
- Jadvyga Petkevičiene
- Jonas Petkevičius
- Fēlikss Nikmanis
- Sigitas Randys
- Endel Ratas
- Henrikas Sambora
- Julius Sasnauskas
- Leonora Sasnauskaite
- Algis Statkevičius
- Kestutis Subačius
- Enn Tarto
- Antanas Terleckas
- Erik Udam
- Ints Cālītis
- Petras Cidzikas
- Arvydas Čekanavičius
- Vladas Šakalys
- Jonas Šerkšnas
- Zigmas Širvinskas
- Mečislovas Jurevičius
- Virgilijus Jaugelis

== See also ==
- MRP-AEG
