= Jüri Kukk =

Estonian chemist and dissident

- Born: May 1, 1940; Pärnu, Estonia
- Died: March 27, 1981 (aged 40); Vologda, Russian SFSR, USSR
- Occupation: Chemist

Jüri Kukk (May 1, 1940 – March 27, 1981) was an Estonian professor of chemistry, anti-Soviet dissident and political prisoner, who died in the former Soviet labor camp at Vologda. (Note: The New York Times incorrectly gave the place of death as Murmansk, repeated in some other sources. Catalog of photos Archived 2015-04-04 at the Wayback Machine, among which some of the grave of Jüri Kukk, one of them titled as "Jüri Kukk's grave site in Vologda Identified by a post bearing his prison number 23781. 30 March 1981")

Kukk, who initially studied and later taught at the University of Tartu from 1958 to 1979, was the author of a number of scientific papers. Although he was a member of the Communist Party of the Soviet Union, it was apparently Kukk's period of scientific work in France in 1975–1976 that opened his eyes to the severity of the problems in his occupied homeland of Estonia and in the former Soviet Union more broadly. Kukk protested the invasion of Afghanistan by the USSR in 1979, and applied for permission to emigrate to the West. After being fired by the University of Tartu, he was arrested by the Soviet authorities in February 1980, along with fellow human rights activist Mart-Olav Niklus, and charged with distribution of "anti-Soviet propaganda". Niklus and Kukk both actively campaigned for Estonia being given the chance to go her way again as an independent nation, free of Soviet domination. Kukk resigned from the Communist Party in 1978 and was subsequently fired from the position of associate professor of chemistry at Tartu University. He was also refused permission to emigrate.

Jüri Kukk was sentenced in January 1980 on charges of "anti-Soviet agitation" or arrested in February 1980 for contact with foreign correspondents and "distribution of anti-Soviet propaganda." He started a hunger strike to protest the arrest of fellow dissident Mart-Olav Niklus. Kukk was transported to Vologda on March 24, 1981, where he was tortured and died three days later.

== Personal life ==
Kukk had a wife, Silvi, with whom he had two children.
