= Gulag Museum =

Gulag Museum may refer to:

- Gulag History Museum, Moscow, Russia
- "Perm-36" Museum of the History of Political Repression, Perm, Russia
