= Ratas =

Ratas is an Estonian surname. Notable people with the surname include:

- Endel Ratas (1938–2006), Estonian freedom fighter and politician
- Jüri Ratas (born 1978), Estonian politician
- Rein Ratas (1938–2022), Estonian politician
