= MRP-AEG =

Estonian political organization

- Estonian Group on Publication of the Molotov–Ribbentrop Pact
- Molotov-Ribbentropi Pakti Avalikustamise Eesti Grupp
- Successor: Estonian National Independence Party
- Formation: 1987
- Founder: Lagle Parek, Erik Udam, Tiit Madisson
- Founded at: Tallinn, Soviet Estonia
- Dissolved: 1988; 37 years ago
- Type: Activist group
- Methods: Samizdat

The MRP-AEG (Estonian: Molotov-Ribbentropi Pakti Avalikustamise Eesti Grupp, the Estonian Group on Publication of the Molotov–Ribbentrop Pact) was an organisation active in 1987–1988 which aimed to publish the Molotov–Ribbentrop pact, together with its secret protocols, and liquidation of its consequences.

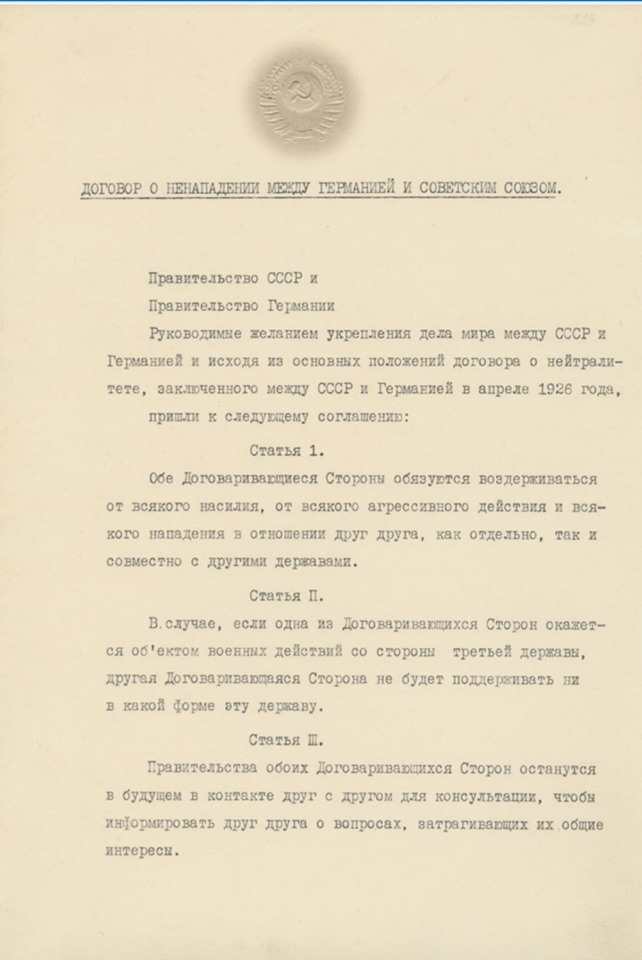
The first page of the Molotov–Ribbentrop Pact

MRP-AEG was set up on 15 August 1987 by Lagle Parek, Erik Udam, Tiit Madisson and others. On 23 August 1987, the 48th anniversary of the Molotov–Ribbentrop Pact, the group held a public meeting in Hirvepark, Tallinn (generally called the Hirvepark meeting).

The group published its informational bulletin (MRP-AEG Bulletin (Estonian: MRP-AEG Infobulletään)) through samizdat, and led to establishment of the ERSP. Copies of the bulletin have been published in book form by the SE&JS publishing company in 1998.
