= Rakhnivka =

Rural locality in Vinnytsia Oblast, Ukraine

Rakhnivka Рахнівка
- Village
- Location in Vinnytsia Oblast Rakhnivka (Ukraine)
- Coordinates: 48°46′59″N 29°32′47″E
- Country: Ukraine
- Oblast: Vinnytsia Oblast
- Raion: Haisyn Raion
- Hromada: Haisyn urban hromada
- Time zone: UTC+2 (EET)
  - Summer (DST): UTC+3 (EEST)
- Postal code: 23736

Rakhnivka (Ukrainian: Рахнівка) is a village in the Haisyn urban hromada of the Haisyn Raion of Vinnytsia Oblast in Ukraine.

== History ==
On 19 July 2020, as a result of the administrative-territorial reform and liquidation of the Haisyn Raion, the village became part of the Haisyn Raion.

== Notable residents ==
- Vasyl Stus (1938–1985), Ukrainian poet, translator, literary critic, journalist, and an active member of the Ukrainian dissident movement

== Sources ==
- "Rachnówka (1)". Geographical Dictionary of the Kingdom of Poland (in Polish). 9. Warszawa: Kasa im. Józefa Mianowskiego. 1888. p. 352.
