= Valeriy Marchenko =

Soviet dissident (1947–1984)

Valeriy Marchenko (Ukrainian: Валерій Марченко; September 16, 1947 - October 7, 1984) was a poet, journalist, translator, and member of the Ukrainian Helsinki Group.

Marchenko was born into an educated family. His grandfather, Mykhaylo Marchenko, was the first Soviet dean of the University of Lviv. His mother was a teacher of literature. Valeriy Marchenko completed the Kyiv Academy of Arts and worked in the newspaper Literary Ukraine (Ukrainian: Літературна Україна) as a translator. He translated into Ukrainian from Azerbaijani and Polish. His speciality was Azerbaijani-Ukrainian literary relations.

On June 25, 1973, Marchenko was arrested and charged with Anti-Soviet agitation and propaganda, mainly for three articles he wrote, as well as his efforts to publicize Ivan Dziuba's work Internationalism or Russification? in Ukraine. On December 29, 1973, Marchenko was sentenced to six years imprisonment and two years exile.

== Activity during incarceration ==
During his incarceration in the Soviet prison system, Marchenko worked as archivist for everything he saw. He collected and published personal accounts about the daily life of prisoners, interviews, and essays.

He also translated many works into Ukrainian, such as the United States Declaration of Independence, as well as works by Robert Burns, Voltaire, and Edgar Allan Poe.

== Second Arrest ==
On October 23, 1983, Marchenko was arrested a second time and again charged under Article 62 of the UkSSR Criminal Code with "Anti-Soviet Agitation and Propaganda". Declared a dangerous offender, he was sentenced to ten years imprisonment and five years of exile. He was sent to the special-regime camp Perm-36 in Perm Oblast.

He was held in terrible conditions, where he became ill. Because of international pressure for the freedom of journalists, he was allowed to move from the camp to a hospital. However, it was already too late.

On or about October 7, 1984, Valeriy Marchenko died in a Leningrad hospital.

== Burial and Commemoration ==
Marchenko is buried in the village of Hatne, in the Kyiv Oblast.

Today, there is a museum devoted to the life and work of Valeriy Marchenko in Kyiv school No. 175. In October 2017 the Soviet-era "International Square" in the Ukrainian capital Kyiv was renamed Valeriy Marchenko Square in his honour.
