= Lihula =

Town in Estonia

Coordinates: 58°40′53″N 23°50′43″E

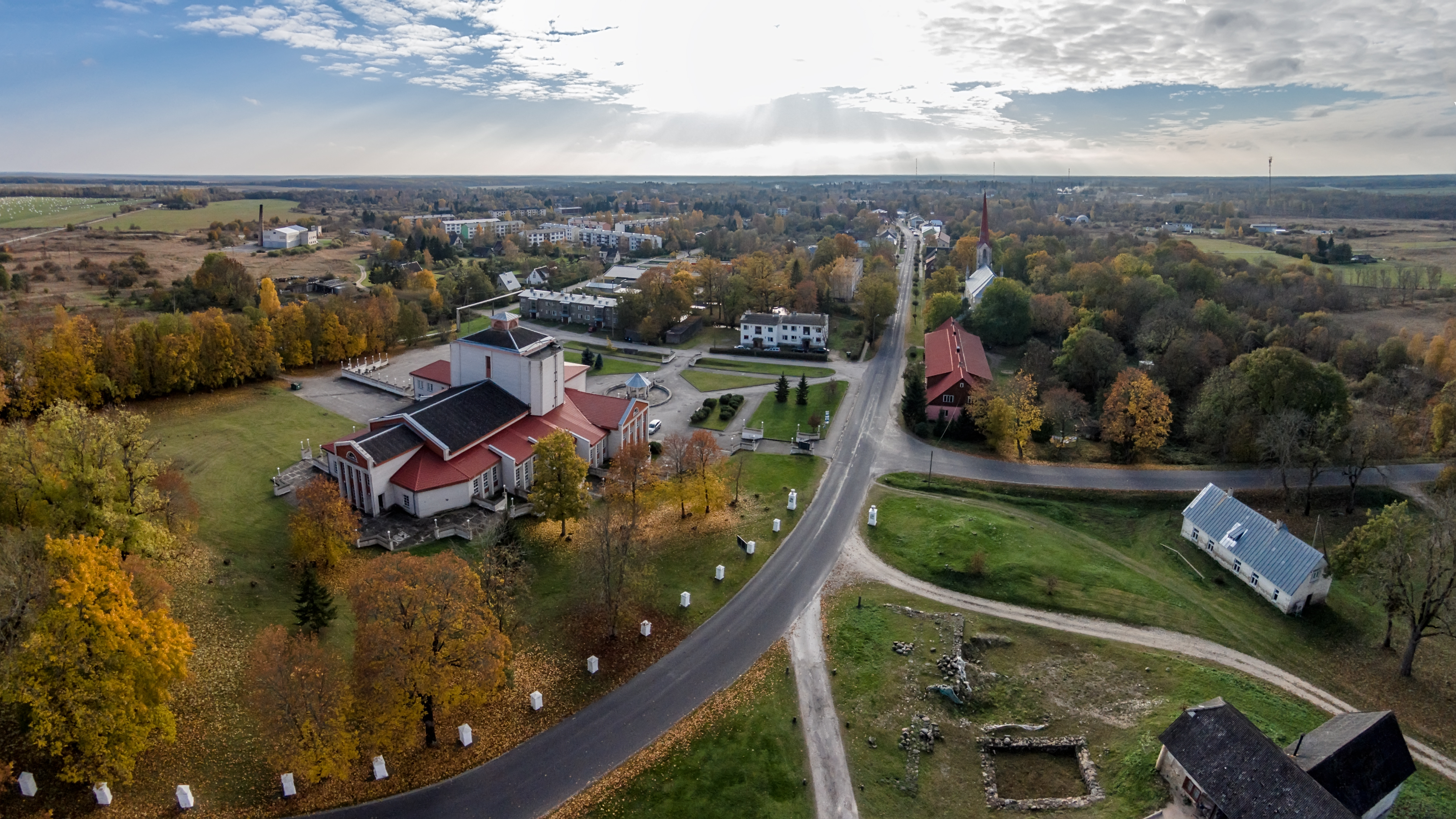
Lihula

Drone video of Lihula stronghold, the manor and town (August 2021)

Lihula is a town in Lääneranna Parish, Pärnu County, Estonia.

== Lihula Castle ==
Lihula Castle (German: Leal, Leale, Lihhola) was first mentioned in 1211, but it appears the site was used as a fortress since the Iron Age. In 1220, a Swedish army started constructing a castle here, but were defeated by Estonian forces on 8 August 1220, in the Battle of Lihula.

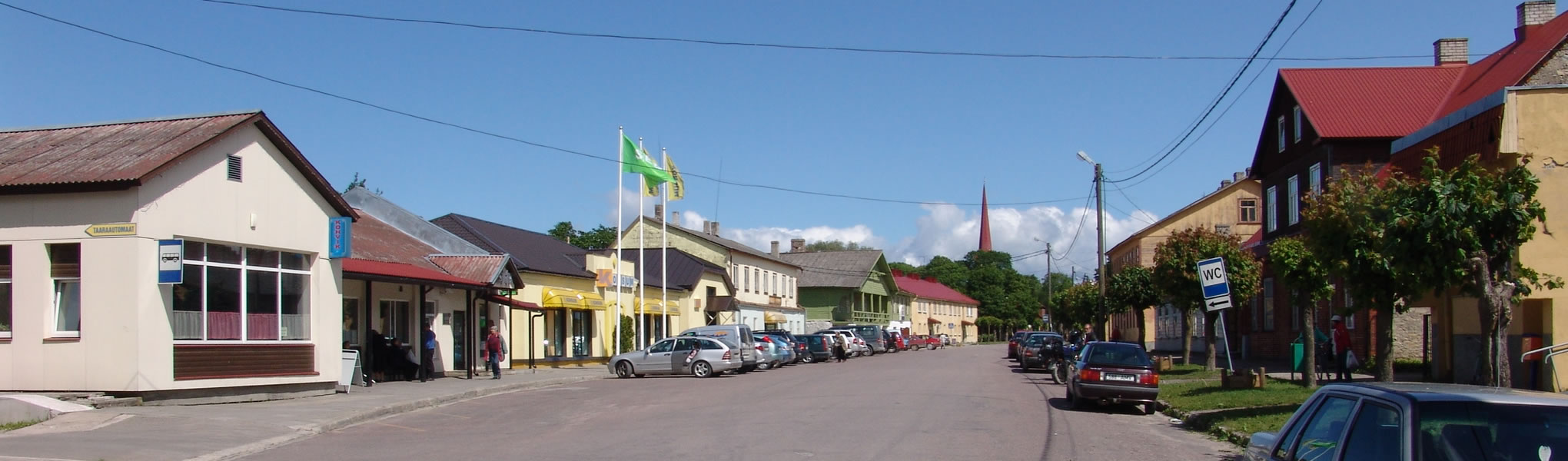
Street in Lihula

In 1238, however, the bishop of Saare-Lääne (German: Ösel-Wiek) constructed a crusader fortress at the site, in cooperation with the Teutonic Order. This attempt was more successful and the castle became one of the residences of the bishop. The Teutonic Order also used the castle as a centre of their commandry between 1241 and 1477. In 1560, the estate was reportedly granted to alderman Gerdt Bellingshausen by Duke Magnus of Holstein. In the course of the Livonian War, the castle was destroyed.

=== Lihula Manor ===
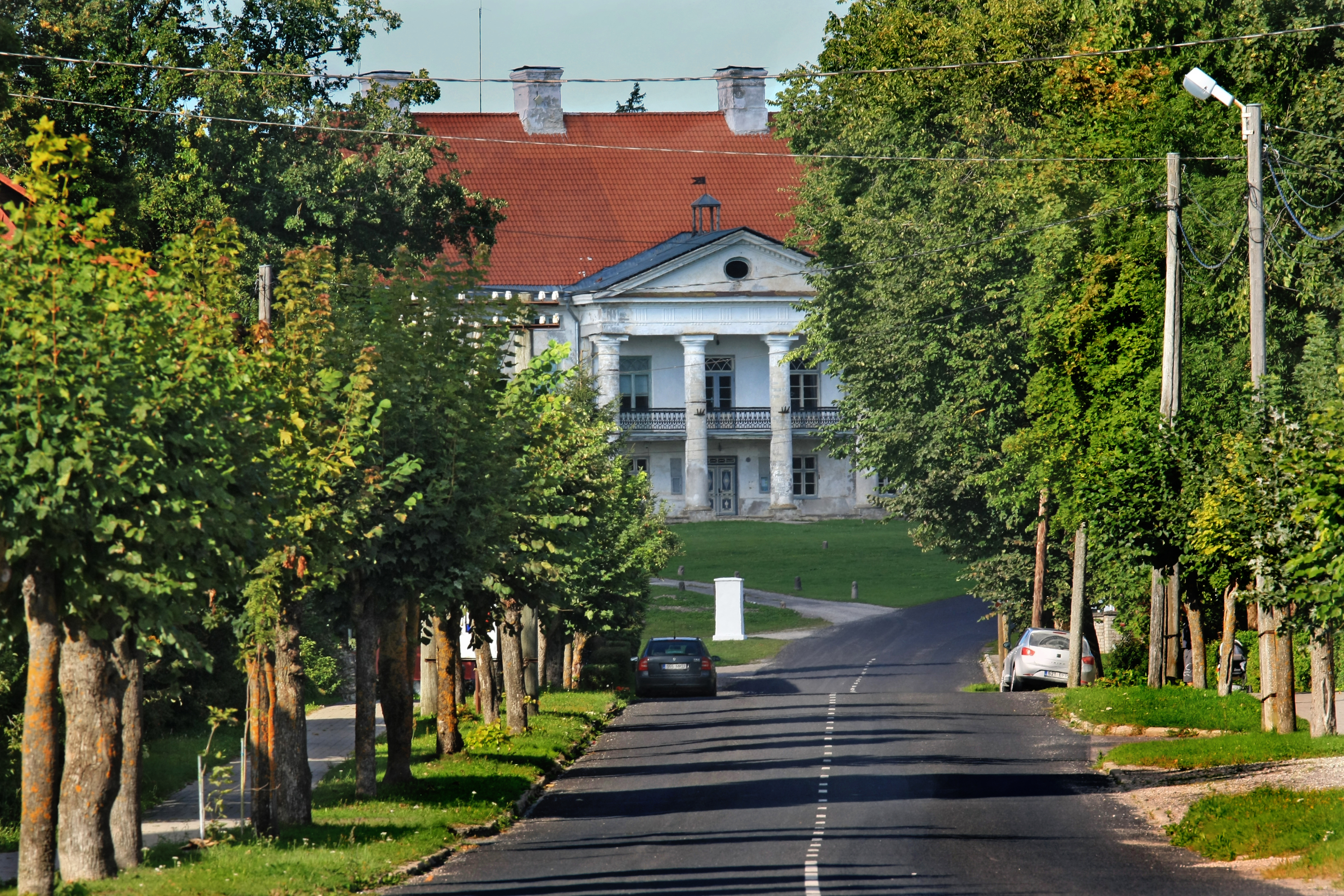
The main street of Lihula

Despite the fact that the castle was destroyed during the Livonian War, a new manorial estate grew up right next to the original location thereafter. In the 1630s, it was recorded as the property of the Swedish general Åke Tott. The manor stayed in the Tott family until 1684, after which it belonged to various aristocratic families. The present neoclassicist manor house was built in the early 19th century.

== Episcopal see ==
From 1211, it was the see of the Roman Catholic Diocese of Leal (also known as bishopric of Estonia), which was however suppressed as such in 1235, to establish on the same territory the Diocese of Dorpat, a prince-bishopric, which lasted till 1558, falling victim to the Reformation.

== Lihula Monument ==
For less than two weeks, Luhila had a monument honoring Estonian soldiers who fought in the Wehrmacht against the Soviet Union during World War II.

By order of Prime Minister Juhan Parts, the monument was removed. As of June 2007, it stands in the private Museum of Fight for Estonia's Freedom in Lagedi, near Tallinn.

== Gallery ==
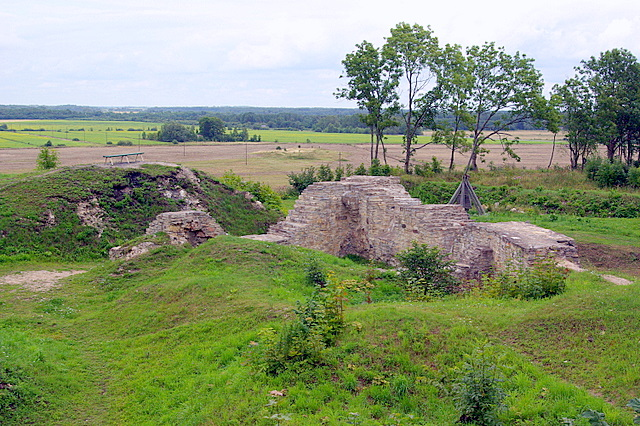
Lihula Castle ruins

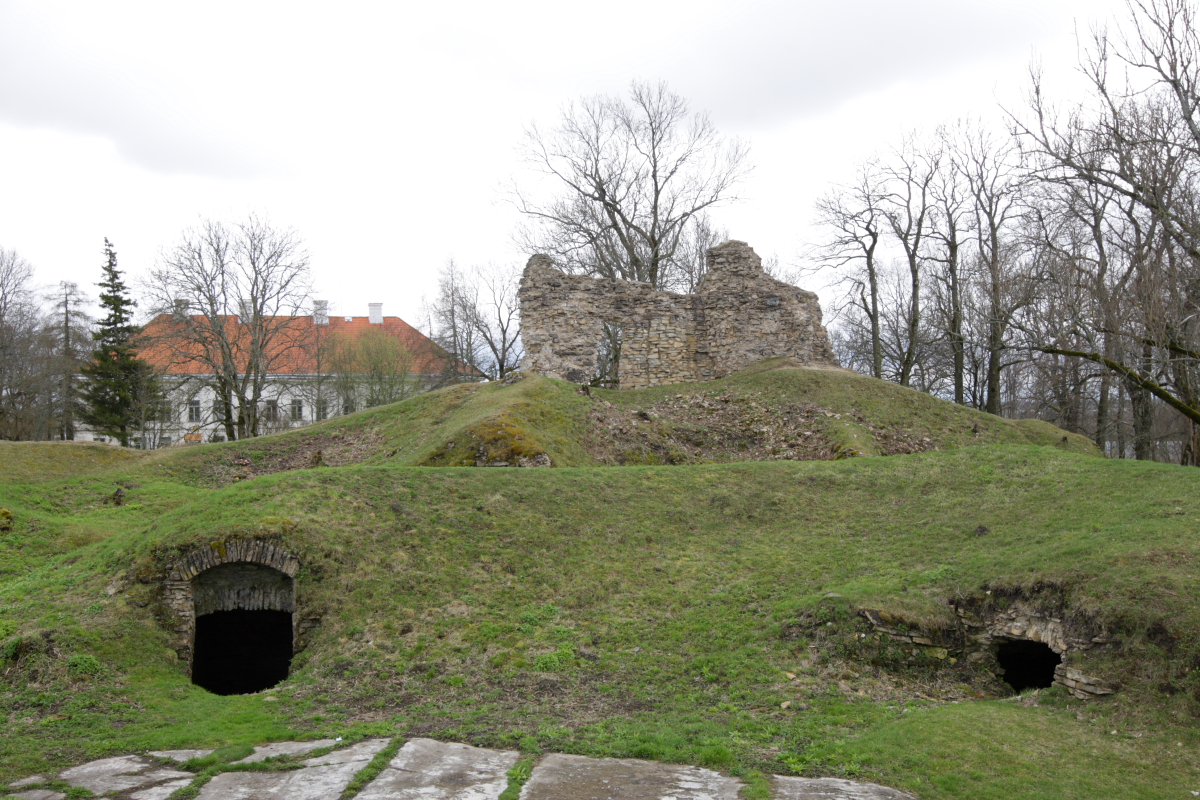
Lihula Castle ruins

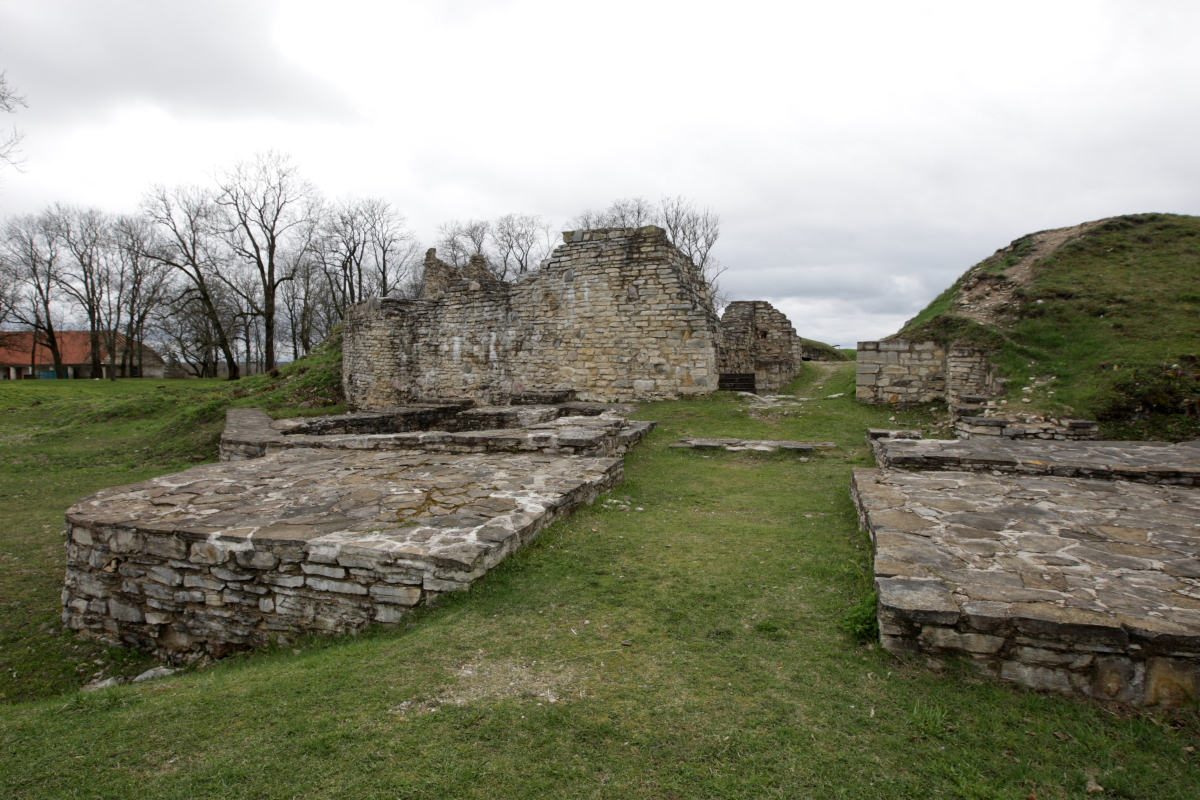
Lihula Castle ruins

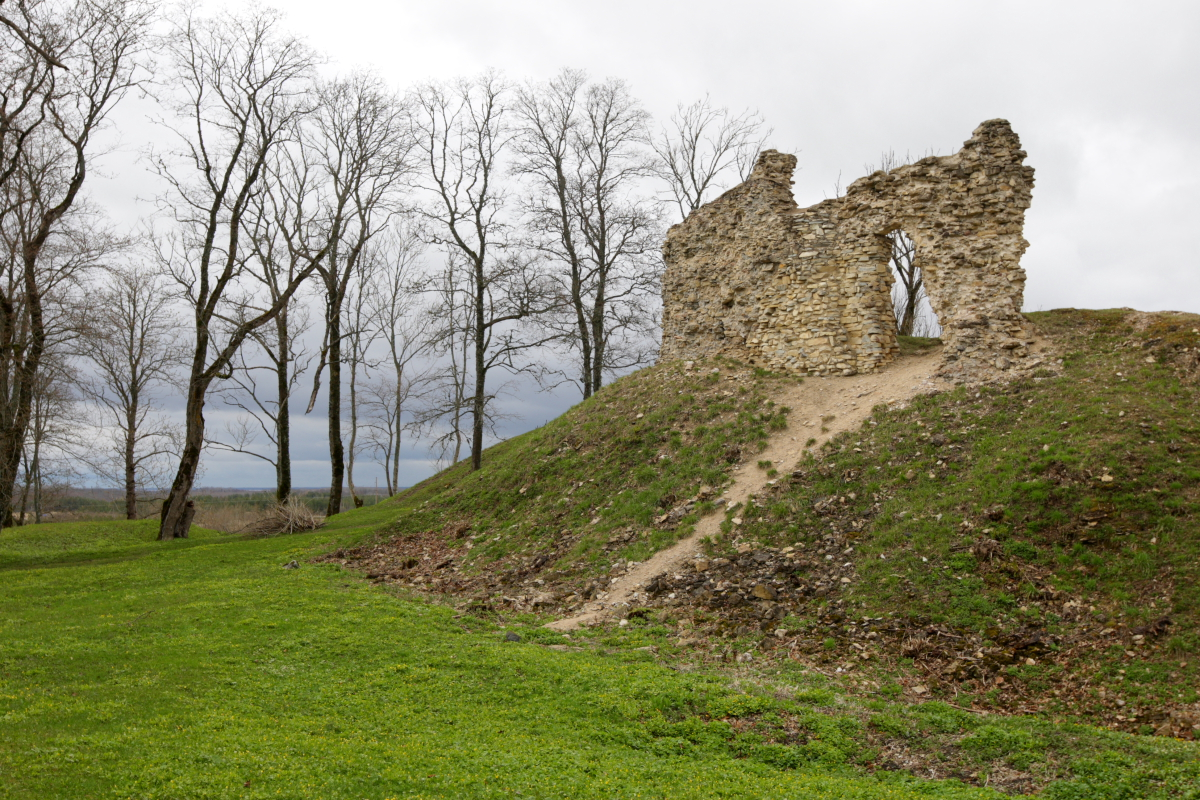
Lihula Castle ruins

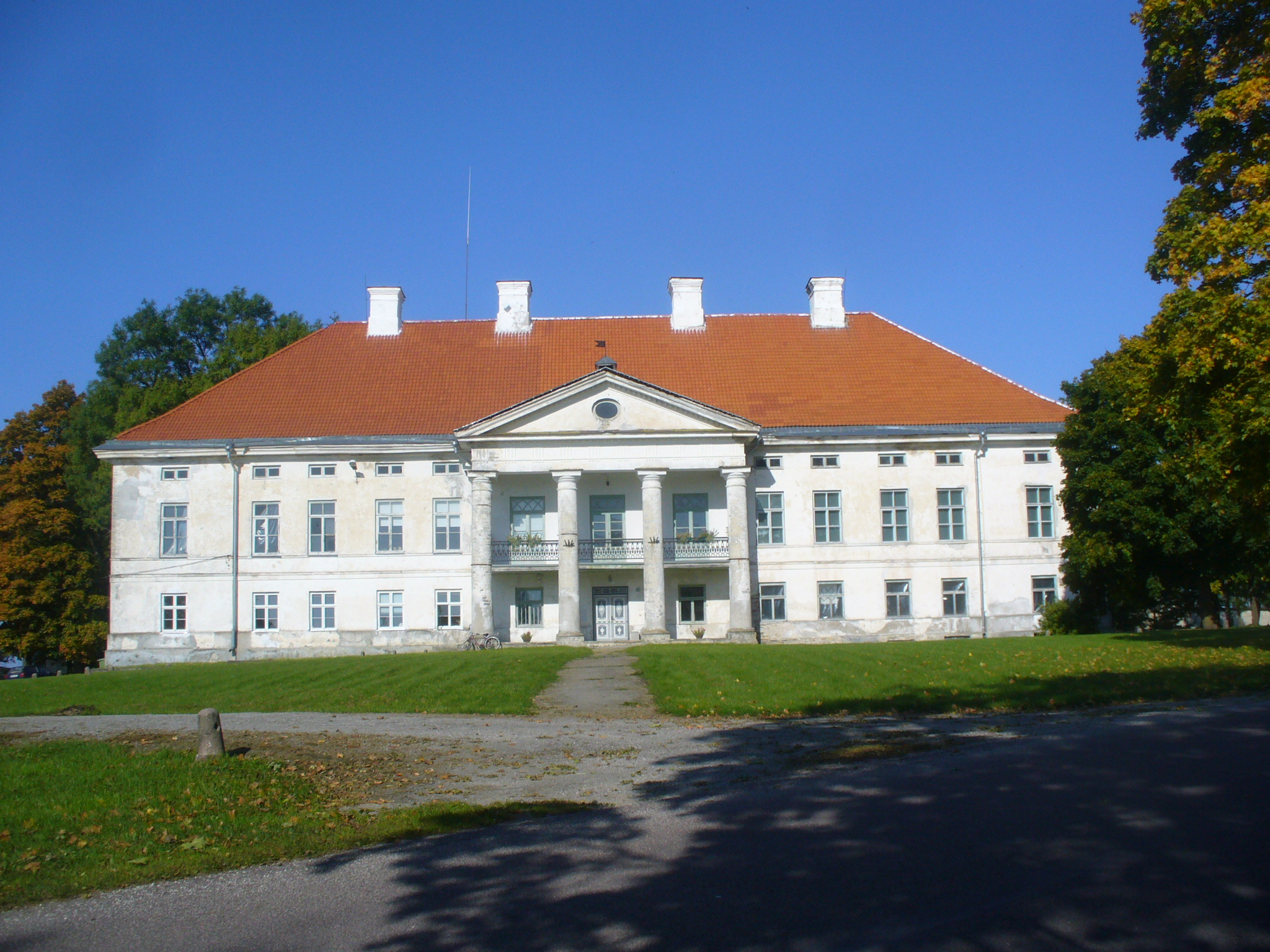
Lihula manor

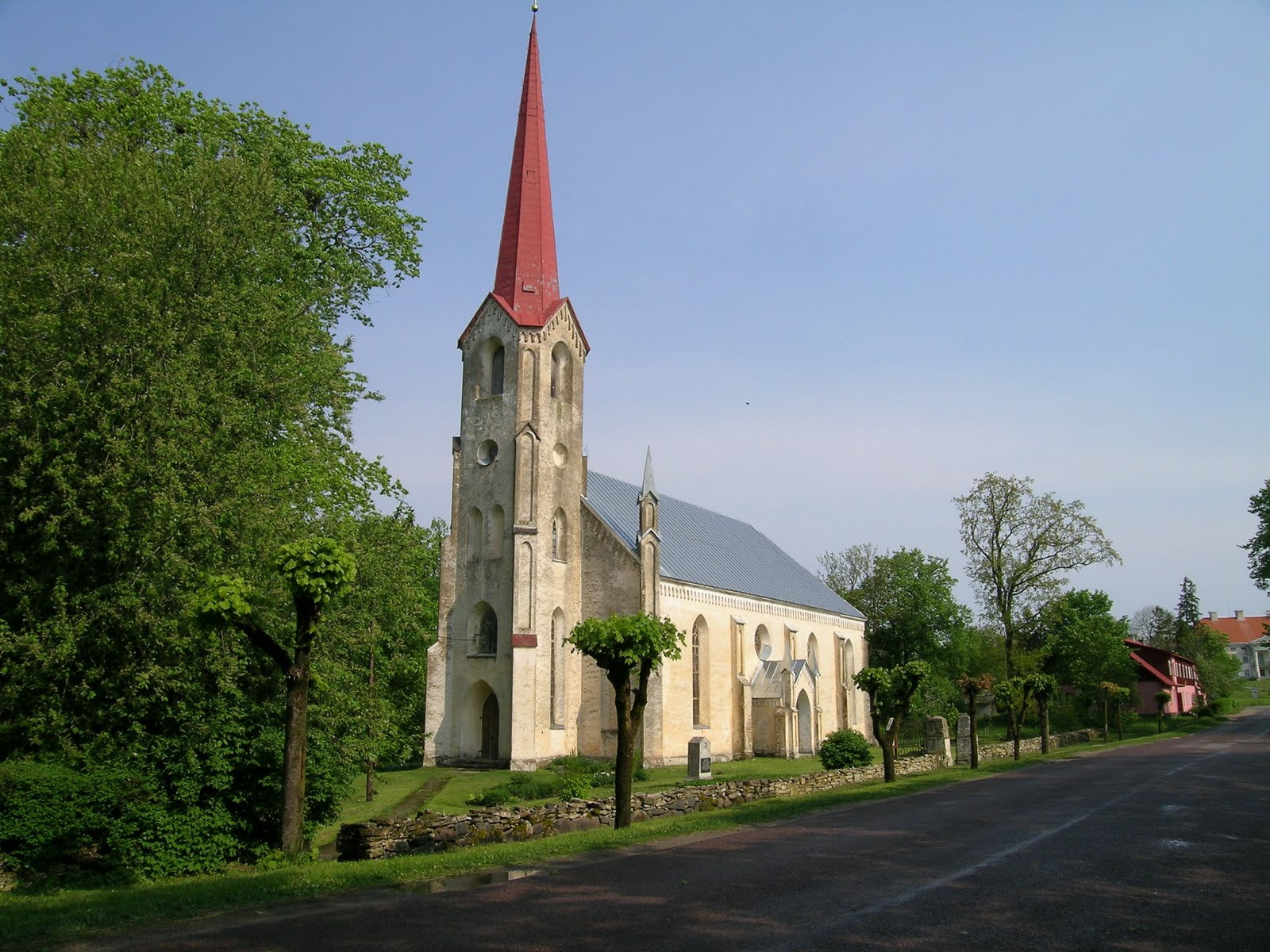
St. Elizabeth's Church in Lihula

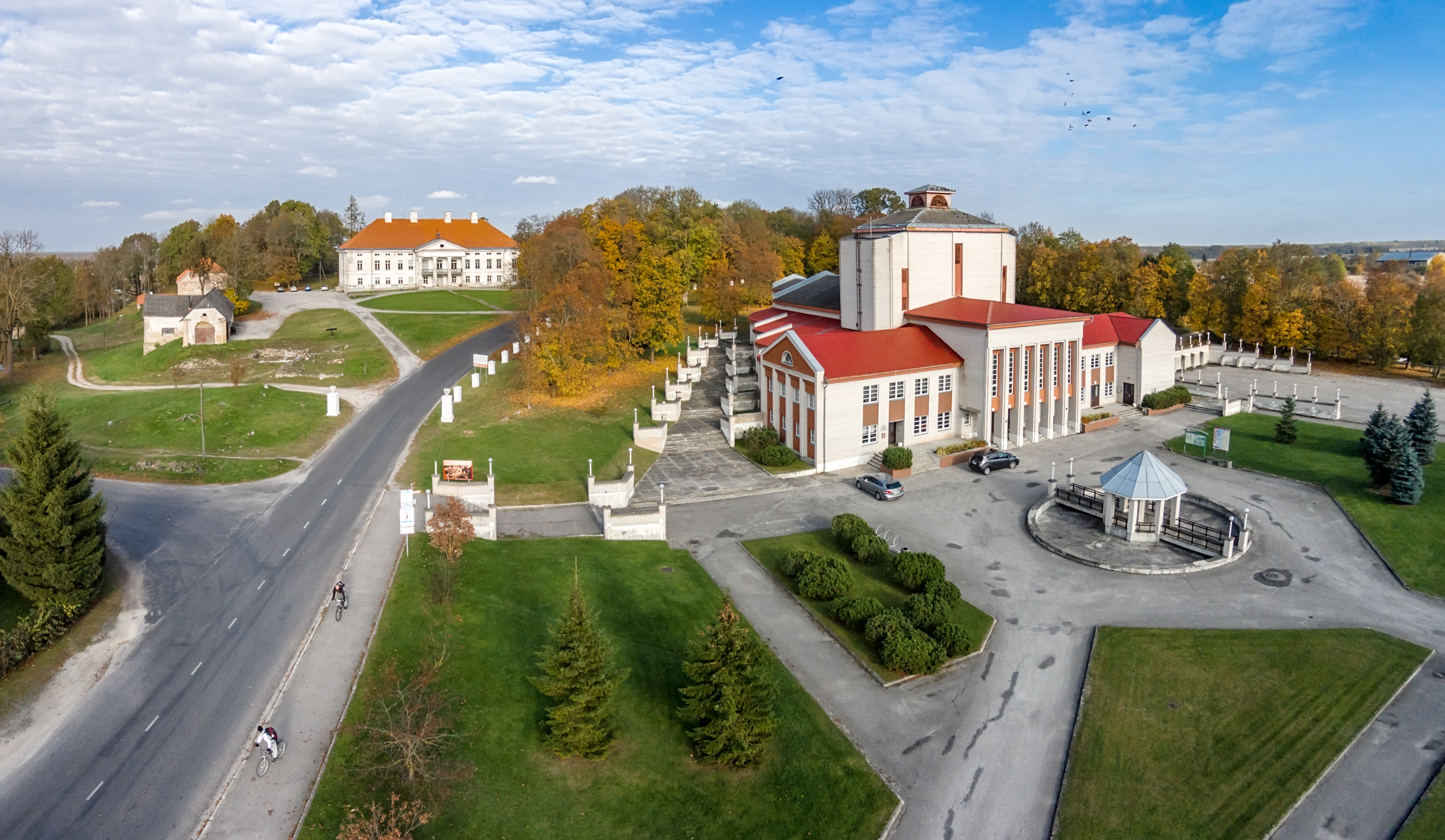
Aerial view of Lihula, with the cultural center in the foreground and Lihula Manor in the background

== See also ==
- Pärnu County
- Matsalu National Park
- Monument of Lihula
