= Yuriy Lytvyn (dissident) =

Ukrainian writer, journalist, and human rights activist

- Occupations: poet; journalist; human rights defender

Yuriy Tymonovych Lytvyn (Ukrainian: Юрій Тимонович Литвин; 26 November 1934 — 5 September 1984) was a Ukrainian lyrical and prose writer, journalist, human rights activist, and Soviet dissident.

== Biography ==
Lytvyn was born in a village of Ksaverivka, Vasylkiv Raion on 26 November 1934 in a family of rural teachers. His dad a veteran of the World War II, after the Nazi Germany's occupation of Ukraine, served in the Soviet partisan detachments of Sydir Kovpak and died from wounds in 1944. Later Lytvyn with his mother moved to village Barakhty, Vasylkiv Raion. After finishing a seven-year school, he enrolled in mining-industrial school in Shakhty (now in Rostov Oblast), but after getting sick he left the school and returned on his village.

In 1953 Lytvyn was imprisoned at the construction of Zhiguli Hydroelectric Station (at that time Kuibyshev Hydroelectric Station) after being accused of theft. Soon after being released in 1955 he was arrested again on 14 April 1956 being accused in created of underground nationalistic organization "Group for Liberation of Ukraine" and convicted to 10 years imprisonment. His punishment Lytvyn served in camps of Medyn (Kaluga Oblast) and Vikhorevka (part of Ozerlag) as well as the so-called "Mordva camps for politicals" (Dubravlag).

While being imprisoned Lytvyn wrote poems in Ukrainian and Russian languages and in 1965 finished his collection "Tragic gallery" (Russian: «Трагическая галерея») (a story about crimes of totalitarian system against Ukrainian people). Shortly all poems were taken away from him during a search.

After being released in June 1965 Lytvyn was forced to move to Krasnoyarsk due to prosecution. On 14 November 1974 he was arrested again and convicted by article 187-1 of the Criminal Code of the Ukrainian SSR (Slanderous fabrications that discredit the Soviet state and social system).

In November 1977, Lytvyn, after just being freed from prison, became a member of the Ukrainian Helsinki Group to facilitate the implementation of Helsinki Accords and continued his struggle against the totalitarian regime in Ukraine. In April 1979 he finished his article "Human rights movement in Ukraine. Its principles and perspectives" (Ukrainian: «Правозахисний рух в Україні. Його засади і перспективи»), in which he created the political program of Ukrainian human rights movement.

On 5 July 1979 while being seriously ill, Lytvyn was arrested again and accused in conducting "anti-Soviet agitation and propaganda". He was convicted by a court in Vasylkiv to 10 years imprisonment and 5 years of exile. From May 1982 he was serving his sentence in camps of strict regime (Perm Oblast, villages Kuchino (Perm-36), Polovinka, Vsesviatskoe) where was the majority of participants of Ukrainian human rights movement. The later influential (in Ukrainian politics) Viktor Medvedchuk defended Stus during this trial. Lytvyn described the work of Medvedchuk as a lawyer on 17 December 1979: “The passivity of my lawyer Medvedchuk in defense is not due to his professional profanity, but to the instructions he received from above and his subordination: he does not dare to reveal the mechanism implemented provocations against me." According to official court papers Medvedchuk had referred to the incompleteness of the investigation in the case and had asked to cancel the court's verdict and send the case for a new trial.

On 24 August 1984 Yuriy Lytvyn was found in his cell with his stomach cut open. On 21 August the camp docter refused to treat him. On 5 September 1984 he died in a hospital of the city of Chusovoy, Perm Oblast.

In November 1989 remnants of Yuriy Lytvyn, Vasyl Stus, and Oleksiy Tykhyi was transported to Kyiv and buried with honors at Baikove Cemetery (lot #33).
