= Museum of Fight for Estonia's Freedom =

Museum in Estonia

Coordinates: 59°23′21″N 24°56′28″E

Museum of Fight for Estonia's Freedom (Estonian: Eesti vabadusvõitluse muuseum) is a privately owned museum in Lagedi, near Tallinn. It specialises on exhibits of World War II battles on Estonian soil, or involving Estonian soldiers. As of 2014, the museum owned the only working T-34/85 tank in Estonia.

In 2024, the museum celebrated its 30th anniversary.

== Monument of Lihula ==
The museum is the current location of the Monument of Lihula.
