= Perm-36 =

Former forced labor colony in Kuchino, Perm Krai, Russian SFSR, Soviet Union

Coordinates: 58°15′47.2″N 57°25′55.6″E

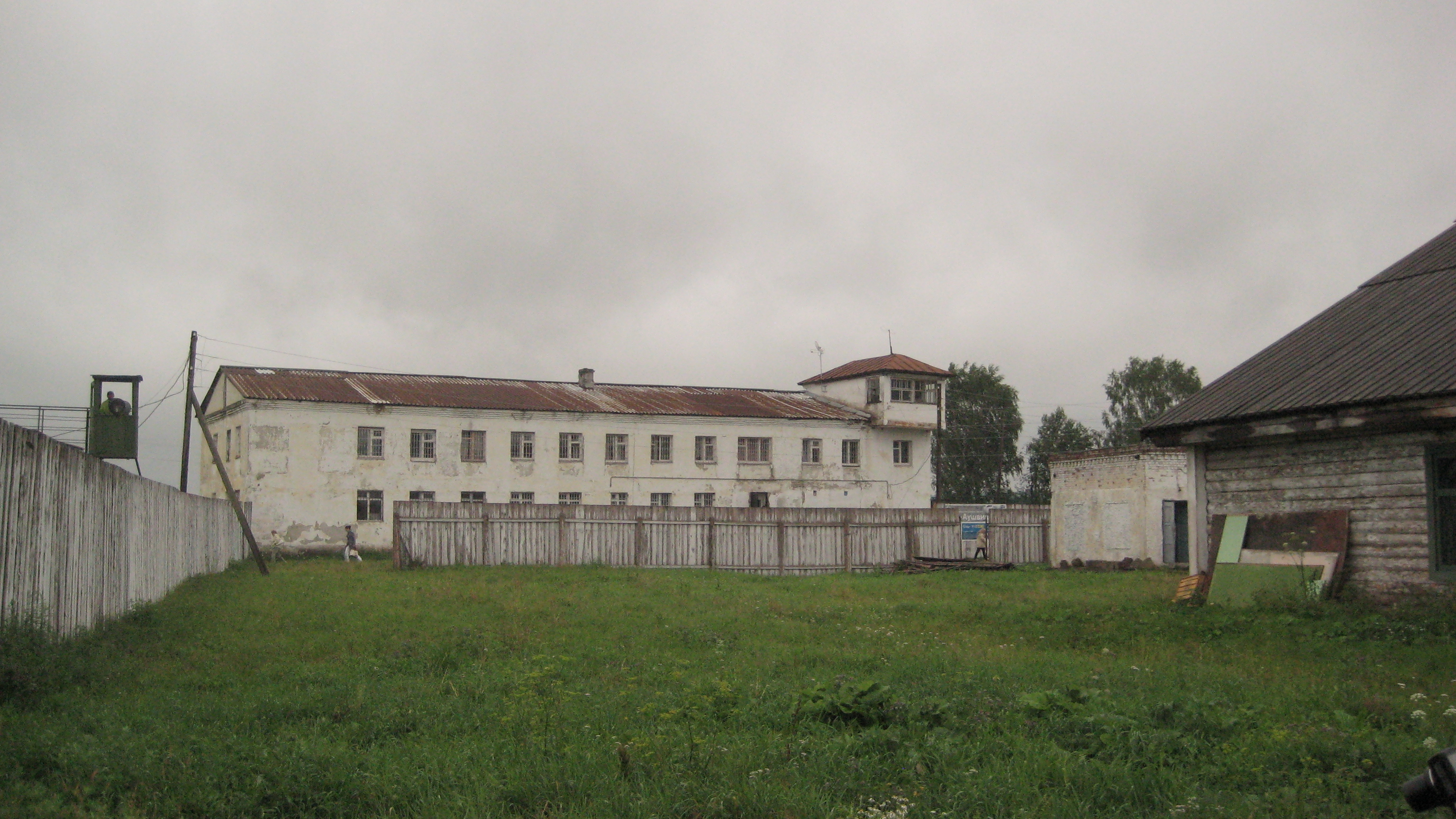
Main building

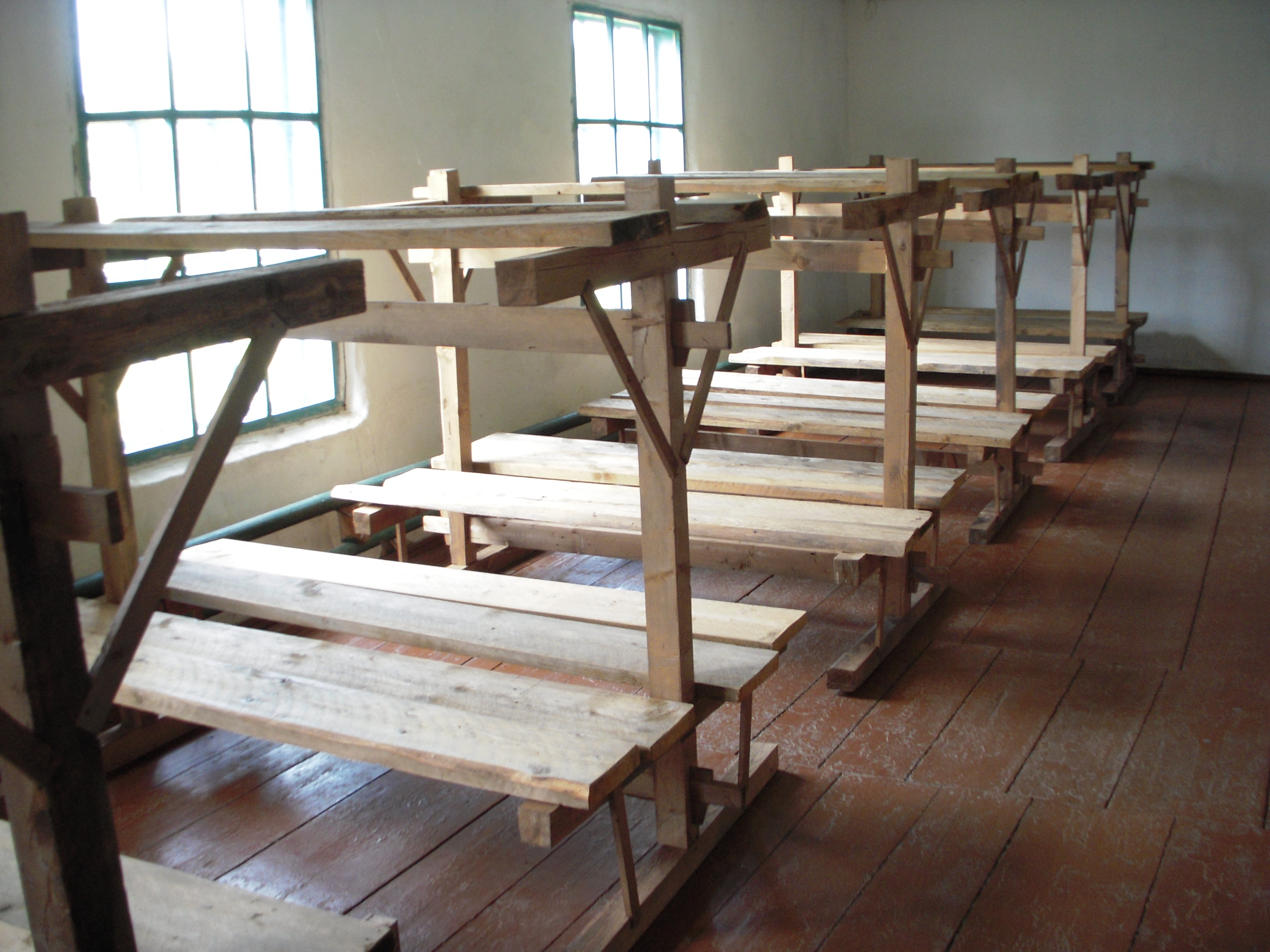
Reconstruction of one of the prisoner barracks

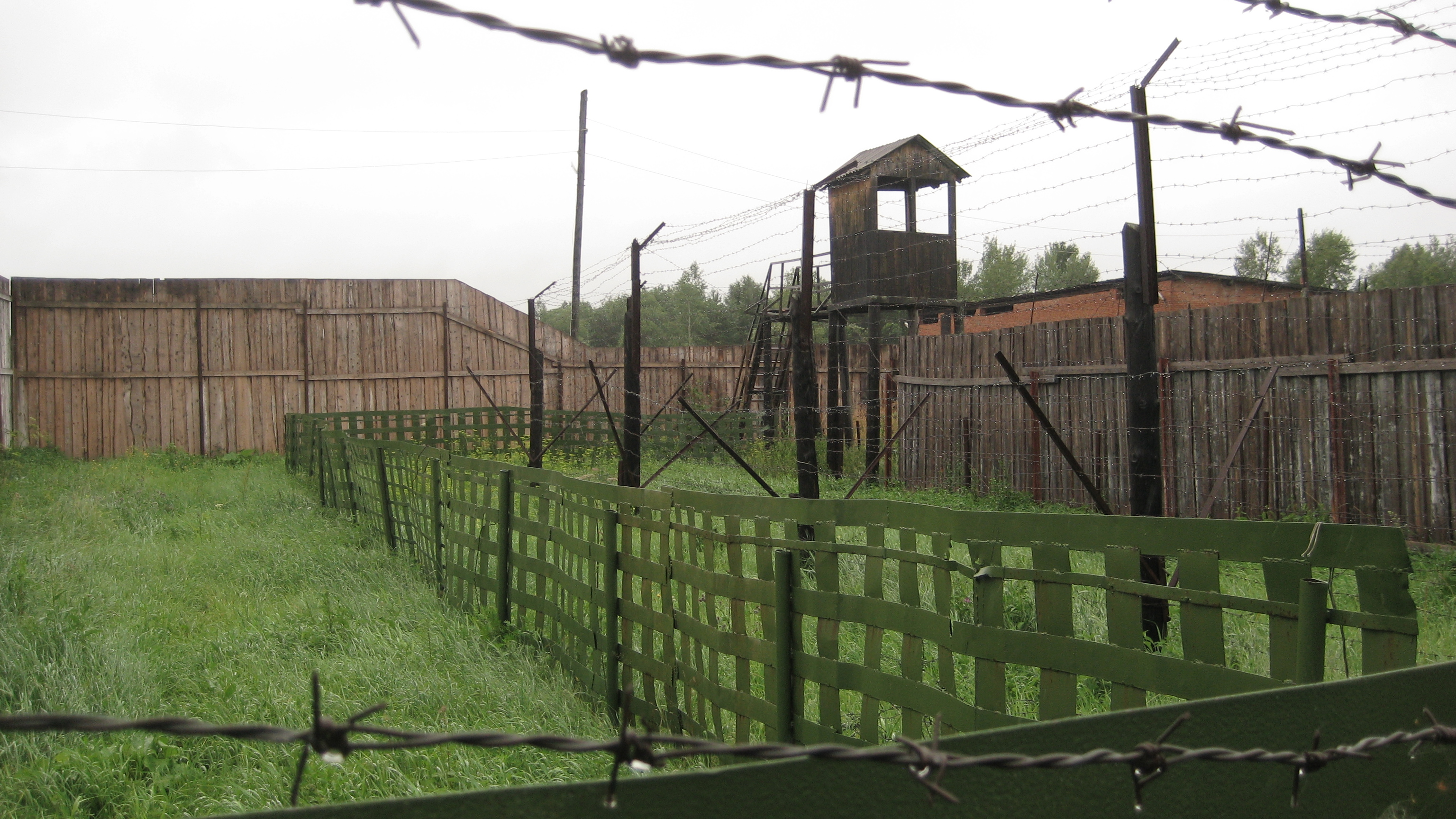
The fence at Perm-36

Perm-36 (also known as ITK-6) was a Soviet forced labor colony located near the village of Kuchino, 100 km (60 miles) northeast of the city of Perm in Russia. It was part of the large prison camp system established by the former Soviet Union during the Stalin era, known as the Gulag. From 1972, it was a strict-regime camp for political prisoners and, from 1980, it also contained a special-regime unit (строгого режима, особого режима) for "especially dangerous state criminals", mostly Soviet dissidents.

Built in 1946 and closed in 1987 , the camp was preserved from 1994 by local historians and the Perm branch of the human rights society Memorial. In 1995, it opened as the Museum of the History of Political Repression, the only surviving Gulag camp in Russia. In 2014, the regional authorities took control of the museum and, in 2015, the NGO that had run it dissolved itself.

== Site ==
Perm -36 stands in the village of Kuchino in Perm Krai, on the Chusovaya River, about 100 km. from Perm and 1,200 km from Moscow. It is enclosed by a wooden fence about two metres high. Two zone survive: the wooden strict-regime barracks of the 1940s and the special-regime building. In the special-regime building the plank bunks have been restored, as have the exercise yards of 6 m², overlooked by walkways along which the guards patrolled. The special-regime building opened to visitors on 5 September 1995, and the 1940s buildings in 2001.

== The camp (1946–1988) ==
=== Timber colony (1946–1972) ===
A prisoners' barrack of the 1940s

The camp was established in 1946 near the village Kuchino in the Chusovoy district of what was then Molotov Oblast (renamed Perm Oblast in 1957, now part of Perm Krai), as a timber colony of the NKVD labour camp system. It was built for about 1,000 prisoner, who felled and sawed timber and floated it down the Chusovaya River. Most of its first inmates had been convicted of ordinary and economic crimes rather than political offences, and many were released under the amnesty that followed Stalin’s death in 1953. From 1953 the colony held former officers of the security services and prosecutor’s offices who had been convicted of crimes and could not safely be held in ordinary camps.

=== Political camp (1972–1988) ===
In 1972 Soviet authorities started moving the political prisoners they regarded as most dangerous from the old political camps in Mordovia to the Urals. Two new camps were set up for them near the town of Chusovoy: VS-389/35 at Vsekhsvyatskoye, known as Perm-35, and VS-389/36 at Kuchino, the former timber colony, which became Perm-36. The first prisoners arrived in July 1972, and a third camp, VS-389/37, was opened later. From then on the Perm camps and the Mordovian camps were the two main places in the Soviet Union where political prisoners were held.

About 40 percent of the prisoners at Perm-36 had been sentenced for “anti-Soviet agitation and propaganda”. Many of the others were long-term prisoners finishing 15- or 25-year sentences from the 1950s and 1960s, often for collaboration with German occupiers during the Second World War.

News of the prisoners’ conditions and of their struggle for their rights got out of the camp and was regularly published in samizdat – typewritten underground publications passed from hand to hand – above all in A Chronicle of Current Events. One issue in 1979 printed a day-by-day record of life in the Perm-36 punishment cells.

=== Special-regime unit (1980–1987) ===
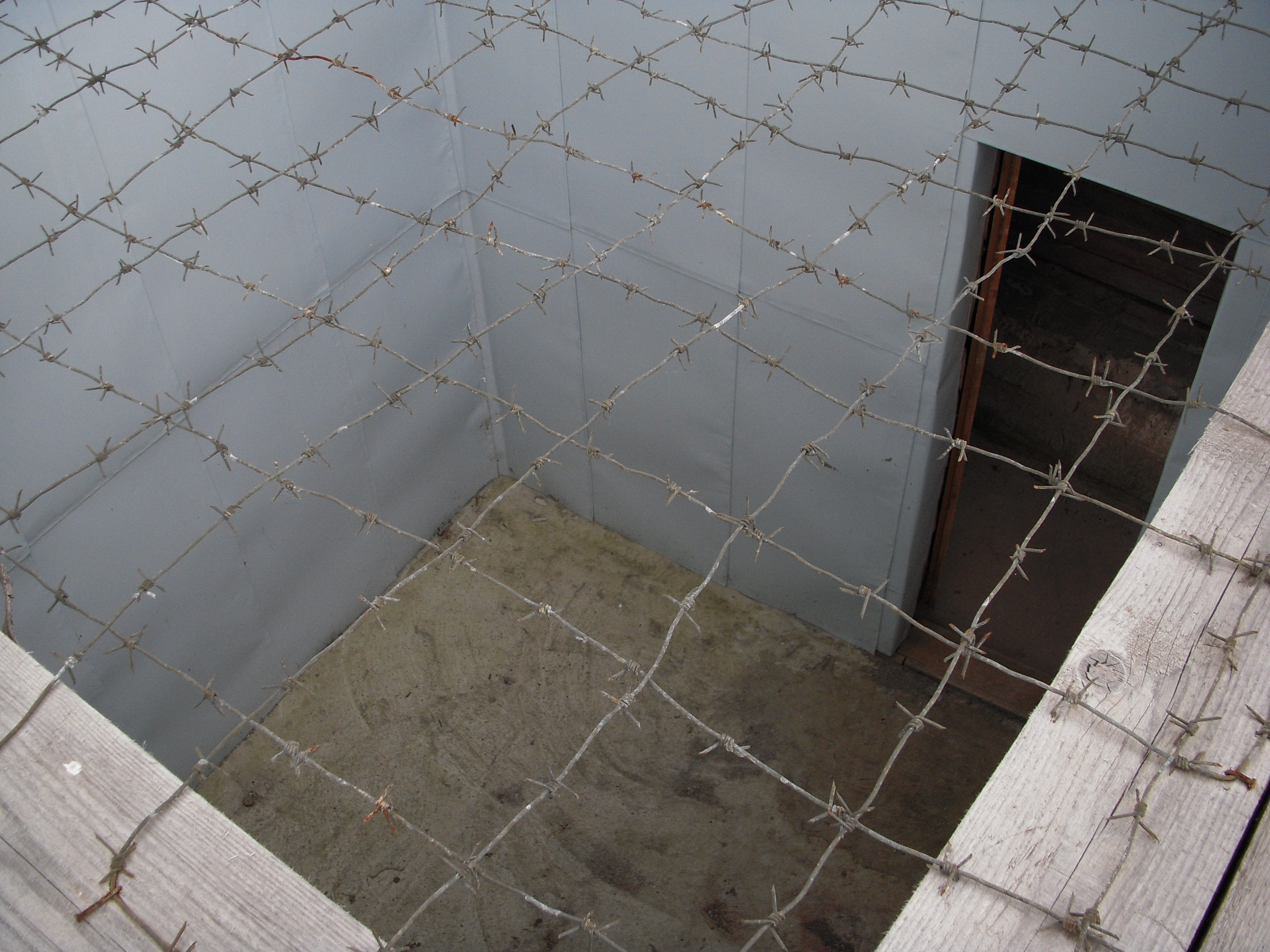
Exercise yard of the special-regime unit

The harshest regime in the camp system was “special regime”, intended for those the state called “particularly dangerous repeat offenders”, in practice people convicted of a political offence for the second time. From 1961 political prisoners on special regime had been held at Sosnovka in Mordovia. On 1 March 1980 this unit was moved to Kuchino. Sources differ on how many prisoners were brought there: 32 according to Vasyl Ovsienko, a former prisoner of the unit, and 23 or 24 according to a team from the US National Park Service. One of them died on the way. From then until it closed, the unit at Perm-36 was the only special-regime unit for political prisoners in the Soviet Union.

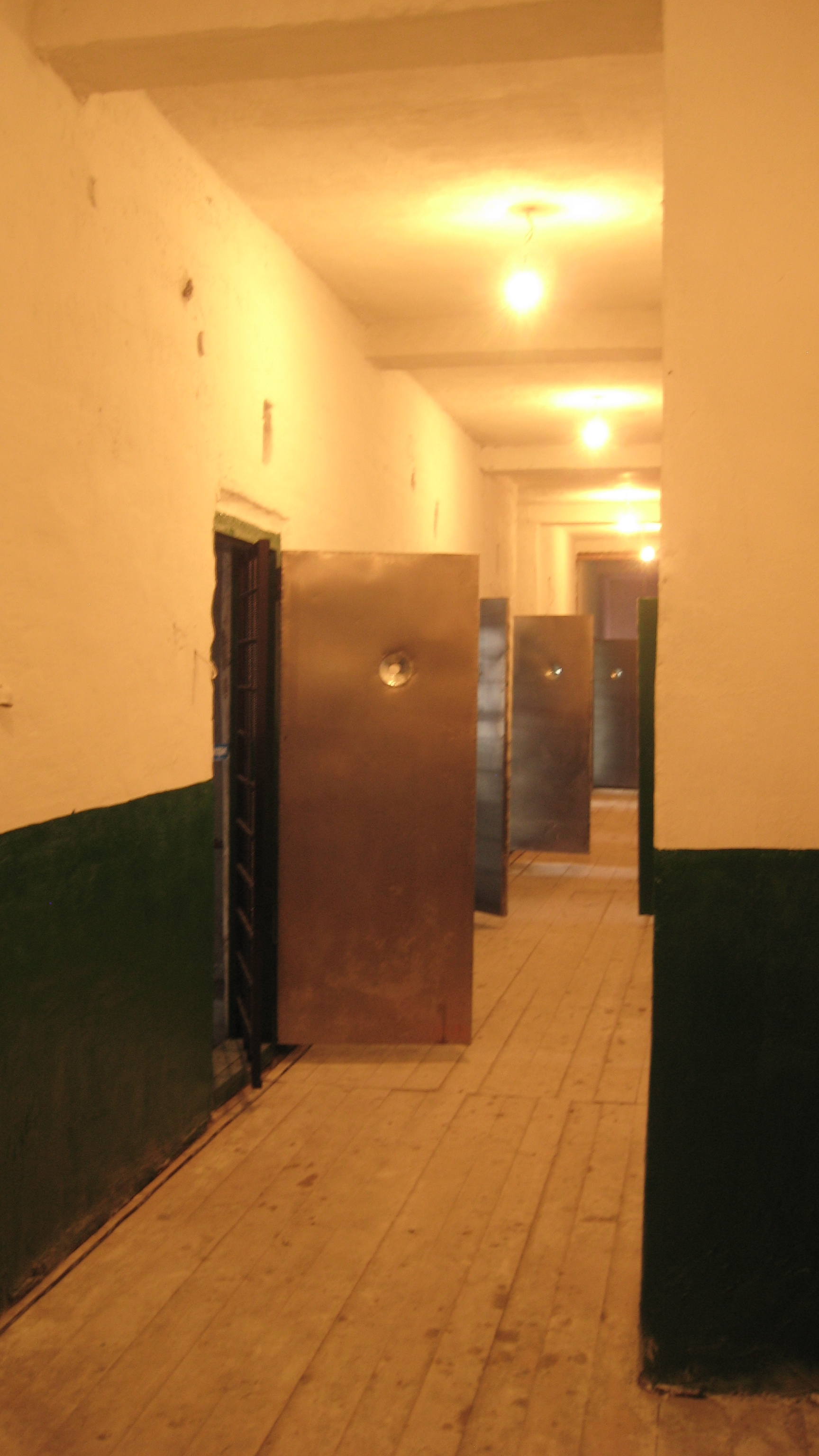
Cell corridor of the special-regime unit

In all, 57 men were held there, 37 of them Ukrainians. They lived in small cells and had to work in them as well; anyone who failed to meet the work quota was put in a punishment cell on reduced rations. Eight prisoners died in the unit, among them Oleksa Tykhy, Yuriy Lytvyn and Valeriy Marchenko in 1984 and the poet Vasyl Stus in 1985.

=== Closure ===
In 1987 most political prisoners were pardoned and released, and the special-regime unit was emptied on 8 December 1987. Perm - 36 was abandoned after a further amnesty in February 1988, leaving the neighbouring Perm-35 as the last Soviet camp for political prisoner until February 1992.

== Notable prisoners ==
Eight prisoners died in the special-regime unit.

Prisoners held at Perm-36 included:

- Henrikh Altunian
- Gunārs Astra
- Balys Gajauskas
- Mykhailo Horyn
- Ivan Kandyba
- Sergei Kovalev
- Levko Lukianenko
- Yuriy Lytvyn, died in 1984
- Valeriy Marchenko, died in a prison hospital in 1984
- Myroslav Marynovych
- Oleksii Murzhenko
- Mart-Olav Niklus
- Vasyl Ovsienko
- Viktoras Petkus
- Zorian Popadiuk
- Oles Shevchenko
- Danylo Shumuk
- Ivan Sokulskyi
- Vasyl Stus, died in the camp in 1985
- Enn Tarto
- Oleksa Tykhy, died in 1984

== Memorial museum (1994–2014) ==
In 1992 former political prisoners, invited by Perm Memorial, met for the first time and decided to find the camp; it was located by the historian Viktor Shmyrov and Tatyana Kursina. On 5 September 1995 the camp was opened to the public as The "Perm-36" Museum of the History of Political Repression (known popularly as the Gulag Museum). It was run by an NGO called the Memorial Historical Center of Political Repression Perm-36. It was the only surviving example of a Gulag labor camp, the others having been abandoned or demolished by the Soviet government before the dissolution of the Soviet Union.

The museum was a founding member of the International Coalition of Historic Sites of Conscience, and about 16,000 people visited it in 2008. There were hopes that the museum might be incorporated as a UNESCO World Heritage Site. In 2004, however, the World Monuments Fund included Perm-36 in its Watchlist of 100 Most Endangered Sites.

== The "Pilorama" forum ==
From 2005 Perm - 36 hosted an annual international civic forum, “Pilorama” (“The Sawmill”, named after the camp’s wood-cutting station). The first one was planned as a small celebration of the museum’s tenth anniversary. The forum brought together former political prisoners, human rights activists, politicians, journalists, bards and rock musicians, among them Yuli Kim and Yuri Shevchuk; in 2009 it drew more than 10,000 people. Visitors included the Human Rights Commissioner in Russia, Vladimir Lukin.

In 2012 pro-government activists set up an “Anti-Pilorama” tent camp next to the forum. In 2013 the regional authorities first cut the funding they had promised, and when the organisers found other sponsors, said they would not be able to guarantee the safety of participants. The forum was cancelled at the last minute and has never been held again. In 2015 activists crowdfunded a “Post-Pilorama” festival, but the authorities closed the museum for the days it was held.

The "Sawmill" was not popular with everyone. It was criticized and attacked by former prison guards of Perm-36 and some of the social movements of Stalinist focus. They argued that the forum organizers deliberately exaggerated the severity of custody "for anti-Soviet propaganda", while ignoring, as they said, prison records and evidence of the guards themselves. Interviews with former political prisoners, museum staff and local residents show that each group remembers Perm-36 in its own way, sees its own memory as the only true one and disputes the versions of the others.

== Takeover ==
Later various bodies of Perm Krai administration withdrew support and funding and disconnected water and electricity supplies. In 2014 the museum's property came under the control of the regional authorities, and in March 2015 the NGO that had run it announced its self-liquidation.

In autumn 2013 an autonomous NGO calling itself the "Perm-36 Memorial Museum of the History of Political Repression" was granted the status of a federal NGO and the museum was included in a list of Russia's "National Sites of Remembrance". The next year a State-funded museum with a similar name was created and gradually began to take over the management of the Perm-36 museum. In June 2013 the regional culture minister, Igor Gladnev, argued that the museum would first have to become a regional state institution before it could be included in the federal programme. At the end of May 2014 the museum's co-director, Tatyana Kursina, was dismissed as director of the new state institution and replaced by the deputy culture minister, Natalia Semakova. In March 2015 the Ministry of Justice began an inspection to determine whether the NGO should be classed as a "foreign agent".

Coming at a period of nostalgia for the Soviet Union in Russia and patriotism due to the annexation of Crimea, these changes were seen by many as an organized campaign against the original museum "of political repression". Official Russian media and some nationalist organisations (e.g. the Sut' Vremeni) began describing the museum established in 1995 as a fifth column.

The NGO eventually disbanded after repeated arguments with Perm-36 officials. The museum and its exhibits were refurbished to remove references to Stalin.

== Memorial complex since 2015 ==
After the NGO dissolved, the new management closed the room devoted to the biographies of dissident prisoners and put up displays on the Gulag prisoners' contribution to victory in the Second World War. The library, archive and collections of the former museum are regarded as missing.

In 2017 one barrack housed an exhibition on the prisoners' role in the timber industry, and another displayed maps of the factories that prisoners had built across the Soviet Union. A petition calling for the original team to be reinstated gathered almost 100,000 signatures.

== In popular culture ==
In July 2010 the Perm Opera and Ballet theatre staged Beethoven’s Fidelio at the former camp as part of its “Opera Gulag” project. It was a promenade performance in which guards herded singers and audience through the camp: the first act was played in the strict-regime zone, after which the audience walked half a kilometre to the special-regime unit. The audience was limited to 250, the number of prisoners once housed in each barrack, while the production involved more than 600 performers.

The 2019 Ukrainian film The Forbidden (Zaboronenyi), directed by Roman Brovko, about the poet Vasyl Stus, is partly set at Perm-36 and depicts his mysterious death in the camp.
