= Hirvepark =

Park in Tallinn, Estonia

Coordinates: 59°26′02″N 24°44′12″E

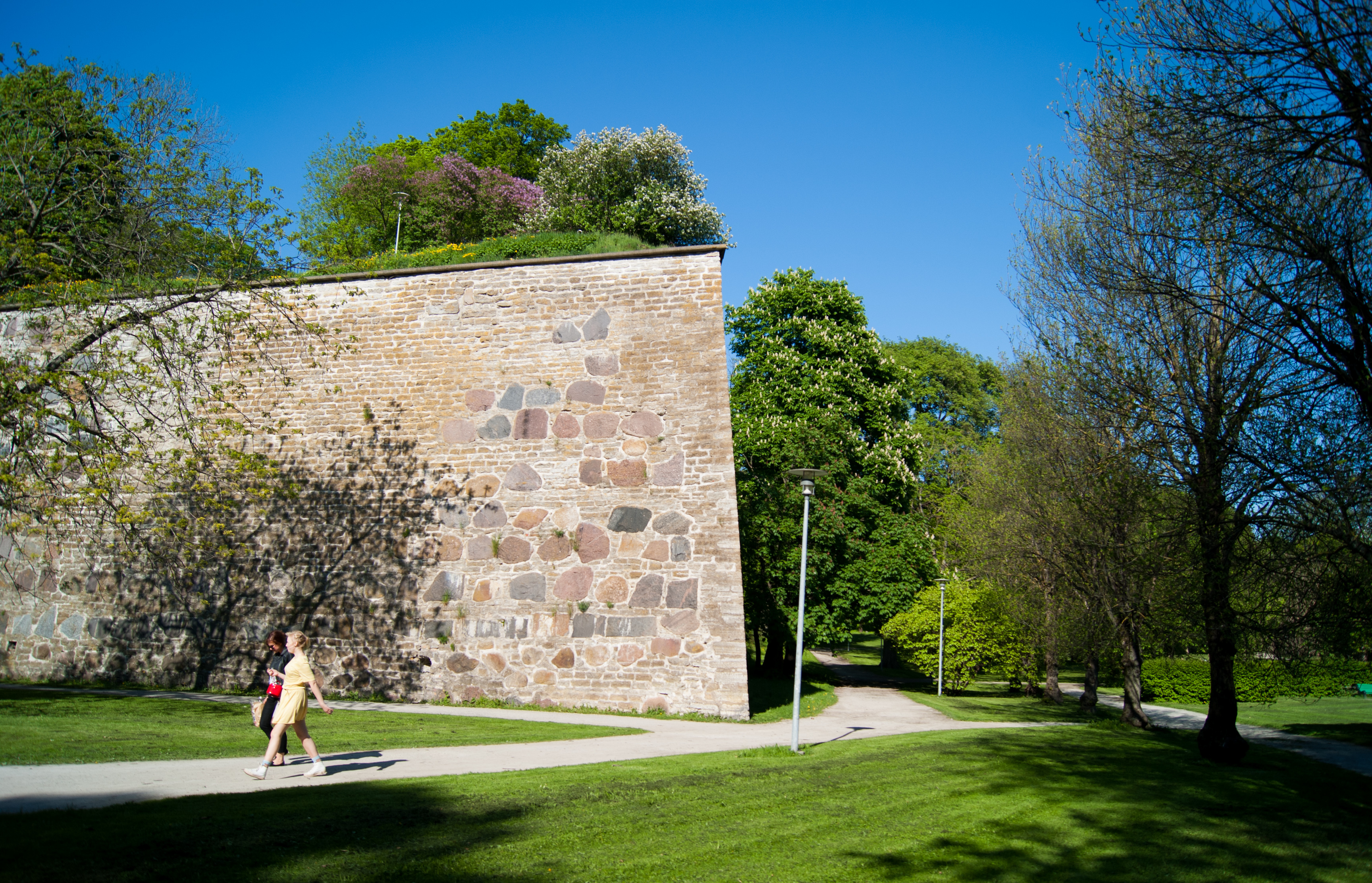
Hirvepark in 2013

Hirvepark (Estonian: Hirvepark) is a park in Tallinn, Estonia.

On 23 August 1987, the anti-Soviet Hirvepark meeting took place in the park.

Hirvepark is one of the most biodiverse parks in Estonia in consideration of its variety of tree species.
