= Balys Gajauskas =

Lithuanian politician (1926–2017)

Member of the Seimas
- In office 1990–1996

Personal details
- Born: 24 February 1926 Vygreliai, Lithuania
- Died: 28 September 2017 (aged 91) Vilnius, Lithuania
- Party: Lithuanian Nationalist Union
- Spouse: Irena Gajauskienė
- Children: Gražina Gajauskaitė

Balys Gajauskas (24 February 1926 – 28 September 2017) was a Lithuanian politician. In 1990 he was among those who signed the Act of the Re-Establishment of the State of Lithuania. In 1978 he became a prisoner of conscience after being sentenced for "anti-Soviet agitation and propaganda" by the Supreme Court of the Lithuanian SSR. Before that he had served a 25-year sentence for having participated in the Lithuanian anti-Soviet resistance, being released in 1973. On 1 March 1980 he was transferred to the special-regime unit VS-389/36-1 of Perm-36 in Kuchino, where he was held until April 1987.

Gajauskas was a member of the Supreme Council – Reconstituent Seimas from 1990 to 1992, and was subsequently a member of the Seimas until 1996. He was an unsuccessful candidate in the 2004 Lithuanian parliamentary election as a member of the Lithuanian Nationalist Union party.
