= Endel Ratas =

Estonian freedom fighter and politician

Endel Ratas (8 December 1938 Tarva, Pärnu County – 2 September 2006) was an Estonian freedom fighter and politician.

Since 1957 he was a member of Estonian Freedom Fighters' Union (Estonian: Eesti Vabadusvõitlejate Liit). From 1959 to 1963 he was in a prison camp in Mordva Republic, Russia.

In 1979, he was one of the fourth Estonians who signed Baltic Appeal. In 1988, he was a founding member of the Estonian National Independence Party (Eesti Rahvusliku Sõltumatuse Partei, or ERSP). In 1990 he was a member of the Congress of Estonia.

In 2000, he was awarded the Order of the National Coat of Arms, III Class. In 2006 he was awarded the Order of the White Star, II class.
