= Baltic Legions =

Baltic Legions refers to the three Baltic Waffen SS divisions:

- 20th Waffen Grenadier Division of the SS (1st Estonian)
- 15th Waffen Grenadier Division of the SS (1st Latvian)
- 19th Waffen Grenadier Division of the SS (2nd Latvian)
