= Erik Udam =

Estonian independence activist and wrestler

Erik Udam (10 July 1938 – 6 February 1990) was an Estonian independence activist and wrestler.

In 1979 he was one of the signatories of Baltic Appeal. In 1987 he was one of the main figure for MRP-AEG.

He has won Estonian Championships in Greco-Roman wrestling.
