= Tiit Madisson =

Estonian activist (1950–2021)

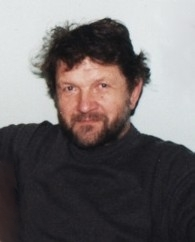
- Tiit Madisson
- Born: June 4, 1950; Tallinn, then part of Estonian SSR, Soviet Union
- Died: June 21, 2021 (aged 71)
- Occupations: Activist, writer, and politician

Tiit Madisson (4 June 1950 – 21 June 2021) was an Estonian activist, writer, and politician. In the press (especially while living in Sweden), he used the pseudonym Silver Ronk. He was a political dissident and prisoner of the Soviet Union.

== Career ==
Madisson was born in Tallinn. He was one of the organizers of the Estonian hippie movement in the mid-1970s.

Madisson was a political prisoner of the Soviet Union from 1980 to 1986. In 1983 he smuggled an open letter from prison in Siberia to the Madrid Conference on Security and Cooperation in Europe, calling for the Soviet Union to stand by the humanitarianism clauses of the Helsinki Agreement - for which he was put into solitary confinement. He spent four years in political prison camps VS-389/37 and VS-389/36 in the Perm region, and then settled in East Yakutia (Kolyma). After his release on 15 August 1987 he founded the MRP-AEG group. After a Deer park rally, of which he was one of the leaders, he was expelled from the Soviet Union in September 1987.

Madisson lived in Sweden from 1987 to 1990. He contributed to Radio Free Europe and participated in the activities of the Estonian Imprisoned Freedom Fighters Assistance Center.

In 1990, he returned to Estonia, where he participated in politics and was a member of the Congress of Estonia and the first edition of the Estonian Committee. In 1995, Madisson worked at EMEX. He was sentenced to one year's suspended imprisonment with a two-year probation period and compensation for financial damage (210,280 kroons) to the company. An appeal set aside the damages, but otherwise upheld the original judgment. In 1996, the court convicted Madisson "of being dissatisfied with the situation in Estonia in May 1996, as a member of the Defence League, to prepare for a military coup" and "sought accomplices to implement his plans and ideas". Madisson was sentenced to 2 years' imprisonment, plus two more months, because the new offense had been committed while on probation. He was released early on the basis of the amnesty law passed by the Riigikogu on 13 November 1997.

From 2002 to 2005, he served as mayor of Lihula. At his initiative, a monument "60 Years of Estonian Defense Battles" was erected on 20 August 2004. It was moved on 2 September by order of the Estonian government led by Juhan Parts.

In September 2010, Madisson and his wife moved to Spain. He returned to Estonia in August 2016.

In 2020, MTÜ Eesti Leegioni Sõprade Klubi awarded him the Estonian People's Thanks Medal no. 2 (No. 1 went to Harald Nugiseks).
