= Mart-Olav Niklus =

Estonian politician (1934–2025)

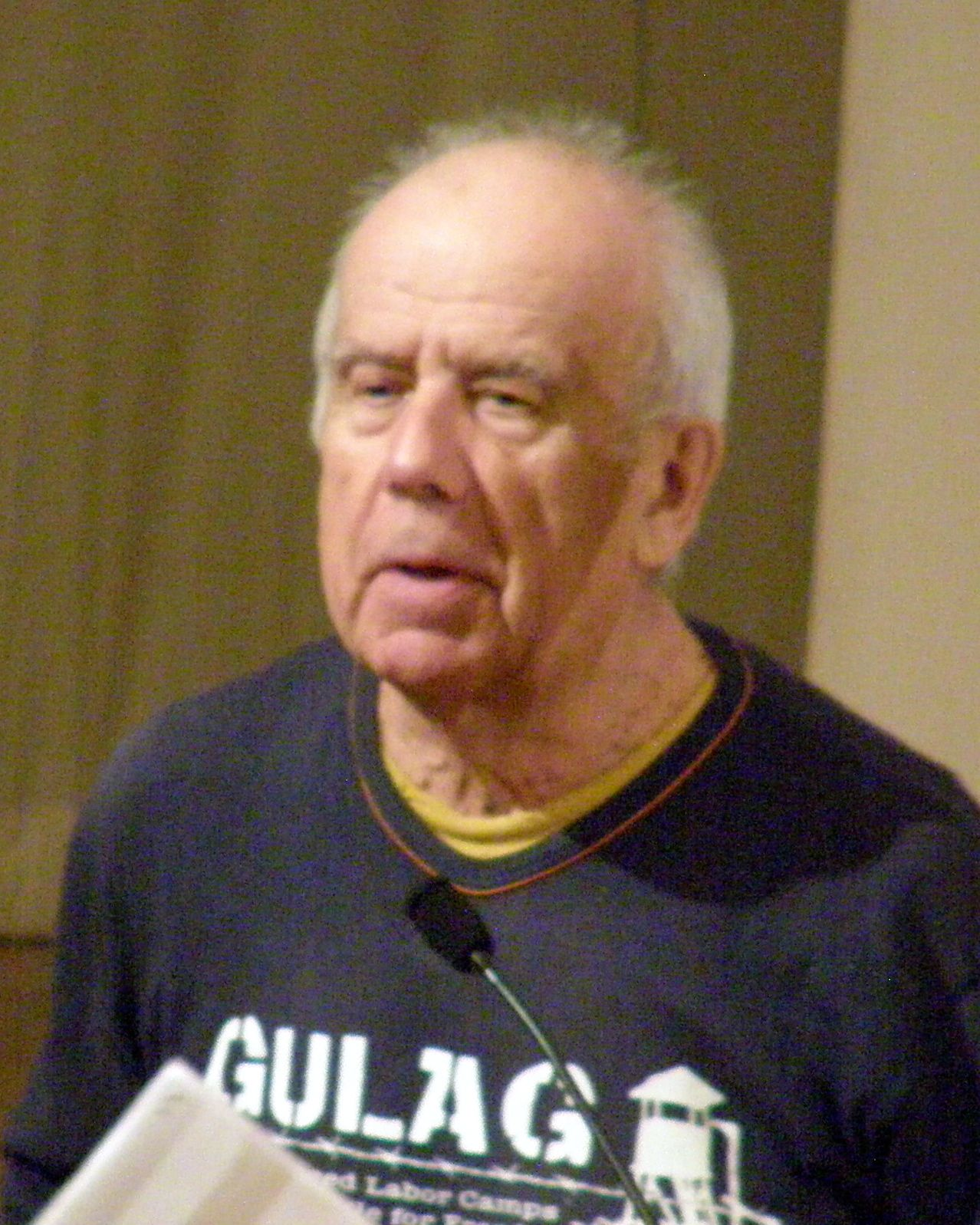
- Born: 22 September 1934; Tartu, Estonia
- Died: 25 December 2025 (aged 91)
- Education: University of Tartu
- Occupations: Ornithologist and politician

Mart-Olav Niklus (22 September 1934 – 25 December 2025) was an Estonian ornithologist, dissident and politician. He was one of the signatories of the Baltic Appeal. In 1981 he was sentenced to ten years in a special-regime camp and was held in Perm-36 at Kuchino. Niklus was a member of VII Riigikogu. Niklus died on 25 December 2025 at the age of 91.
