= Petro Rozumnyi =

Ukrainian Soviet dissident and human rights activist (1926–2013)

- Петро Розумний
- Born: 7 March 1926; Chaplynka, Ukrainian SSR, Soviet Union (now Ukraine)
- Died: 20 March 2013 (aged 87); Ivano-Frankivsk, Ukraine
- Occupation: Human rights activist
- Political party: Ukrainian Helsinki Union; Ukrainian Republican Party; Our Ukraine

Petro Pavlovych Rozumnyi (Ukrainian: Петро Павлович Розумний; 7 March 1926 – 20 March 2013) was a Ukrainian Soviet dissident and human rights activist who was a member of the Ukrainian Helsinki Group.

== Early life and career ==
Petro Pavlovych Rozumnyi was born on 7 March 1926 in the village of Chaplynka, in what was then part of the Soviet Union. Shortly after his birth, his family migrated to the village of Pshenychne, a newly established village in right-bank Ukraine comprising left-bank peasants in search of uncultivated land. His father, Pavlo Rozumnyi, was arrested during the Holodomor and sentenced to work on the Moscow Canal as prison labour, during which he died. Petro, as well as the rest of the family, only survived as a result of his father hiding the family's grain. In 1942, during Operation Barbarossa, Nazi German soldiers arrested Rozumnyi, then aged 16, and sent him to work as a forced labourer in the city of Eisleben. Rozumnyi was freed by the United States Army in 1945 and repatriated to the Soviet Union, where he was conscripted into the Soviet Army. He served in Poland and Karelia for three years before being demobilised.

Rozumnyi studied at the Dnipropetrovsk Institute of Foreign Languages, graduating in 1952. He worked as an English teacher in the western Ukrainian city of Pochaiv, later working at a local history museum in Kremenets.

== Dissident career ==
Rozumnyi became acquainted with Yevhen Sverstiuk, a leader of the growing underground Ukrainian intelligentsia, in 1952 while working in western Ukraine. He soon built up a friendship and working relationship with Sverstiuk, helping to organise a Shevchenko Days celebration and mobilise student bodies in Ternopil Oblast for Ukrainian causes. This brought the two under surveillance, and in 1961 Rozumnyi spent six days imprisoned. After this, he relocated to Solone in Dnipropetrovsk Oblast and resumed working as a teacher.

While teaching in Solone, Rozumnyi refused to give lectures in support of state atheism, socialism, and the Communist Party of the Soviet Union. He distributed samvydav publications to his fellow teachers and students, including the works of Pavlo Tychyna, Volodymyr Sosiura, Yevhen Malaniuk, Vasyl Symonenko and Ivan Dziuba. He collaborated with Ivan Sokulskyi, a fellow dissident, on printing Dziuba's Internationalism or Russification? Rozumnyi's samvydav activities, as well as his deviation from state curriculum, drew the attention of the Soviet authorities. He later left his teaching career to work in construction for family reasons unrelated to his dissident activities.

Rozumnyi's flat was searched by the KGB on 25 October 1969 after Sokulskyi was arrested. He was detained for questioning, as the KGB demanded that he give testimony against Sokulskyi, Dziuba and Sverstiuk. Rozumnyi was held for four days, refusing to give testimony. He was later released, and in 1974 he again migrated to Ivano-Frankivsk where he was a railway conductor. He continued to be monitored by the KGB, which repeatedly conducted searches of his home, interrogated him and demanded that he sign waivers denouncing "anti-Soviet activity". He was later fired from his job (officially as part of downsizing, although it came after he wrote a letter to the Literaturnaya Gazeta newspaper condemning Soviet anti-alcohol campaigns) and became director of the Dnipropetrovsk Regional Philharmonic Hall.

Rozumyni joined the Ukrainian Helsinki Group in 1978, returning to Pshenychne in order to increase the group's geographical scope. In the spring of 1979, he visited several dissidents in Siberia, including Sverstiuk and Viacheslav Chornovil. Rozumnyi delivered a message to Chornovil on behalf of fellow UHG member Zenovii Krasivskyi asking him to assume the role of the group's leader in place of Oksana Meshko, who had stopped admitting new members to the group due to her being heavily surveilled by the KGB.

=== Arrest ===
While returning from Siberia, Rozumnyi was detained at an airport by Militsiya after a knife was found on him during a search. He was initially released, but in autumn 1979 he was arrested and put to trial. According to dissident Petro Grigorenko in November 1981, his arrest came as part of a broader crackdown on Ukrainian human rights activists following the 1979 Conference on Security and Co-operation in Europe meeting in Belgrade. Anatolii Sokorynskyi, a personal friend of Rozumnyi, later claimed that the trial descended into chaos, with Rozumnyi refusing a lawyer, demanding that proceeds be conducted in Ukrainian, and having the judge removed after revealing that he had taken bribes. Rozumnyi was ultimately sentenced to three years' imprisonment, which he served out in Zhovti Vody and Nikopol, Dnipropetrovsk Oblast, and Bikin, in Russia's far-eastern Khabarovsk Krai.

=== Post-release ===
Following his release, Rozumnyi returned to Pshenychne, where he worked on a collective farm. He would return to the Far East in November 1984 to help Meshko return home after she had been arrested. He continued to be active in the UHG's operations after being released, being one of nineteen signatories to a 11 March 1988 notice that the group would be publicly resuming its activities. Rozumnyi was also leader of the Ukrainian Helsinki Union in Dnipropetrovsk Oblast and a member of the party's All-Ukrainian Coordination Council.

== Later career and death ==
Rozumnyi was a founding member of the Ukrainian Republican Party in April 1990, being selected as the party's secretary for foreign affairs. From 1992, he was also chairman of the party's Dnipropetrovsk Oblast branch, as well as chairman of the Solone Raion branch and a member of the party's ethics commission from 1994. Rozumnyi joined the Our Ukraine party, being active in the party's human rights and rural land reform issues. He was awarded the Order for Courage by Ukrainian President Viktor Yushchenko in 2006.

Rozumnyi died on 19 March 2013 in the city of Ivano-Frankivsk. He was buried on 22 March at Dem'ianiv Laz, a former site of mass burials for victims of the NKVD.
