= Ivan Sokulskyi =

Ukrainian poet, Soviet dissident and human rights activist (1940–1992)

- Іван Григорович Сокульський
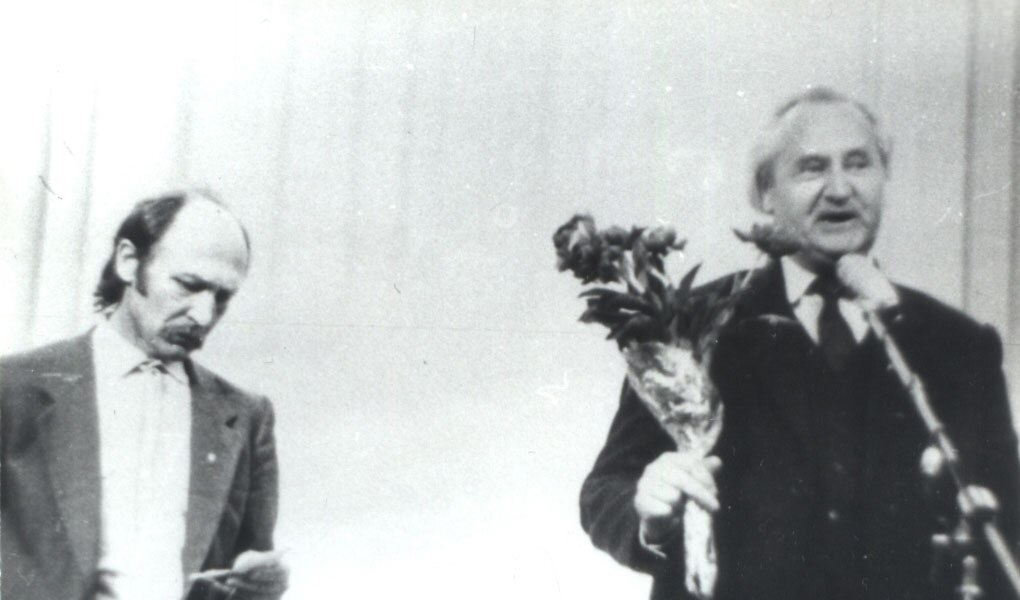
- Sokulskyi on left
- Born: 13 July 1940; Chervonyi Yar, Ukrainian SSR, Soviet Union (now Ukraine)
- Died: 22 June 1992 (aged 51); Dnipropetrovsk, Ukraine (now Dnipro, Ukraine)
- Education: University of Lviv; University of Dnipropetrovsk (expelled)
- Occupations: Poet; human rights activist
- Spouse: Orysa Lesiv (m. 1974)
- Writing career
- Period: c. 1962–1992
- Notable work: Letter of the Artistic Youth of Dnipropetrovsk
- Literary movement: Sixtiers

Ivan Hryhorovych Sokulskyi (Ukrainian: Іва́н Григо́рович Соку́льський; 13 July 1940 – 22 June 1992) was a Ukrainian poet, Soviet dissident and human rights activist who was a member of the Ukrainian Helsinki Group.

== Early life and career ==
Ivan Hryhorovych Sokulskyi was born on 13 July 1940 in the khutir of Chervonyi Yar, in Synelnykove Raion within Ukraine's southern Dnipropetrovsk Oblast. His father volunteered for frontline Red Army service after the beginning of Operation Barbarossa and was declared missing in action in February 1944. Sokulskyi graduated from Synelnykove Secondary School No. 3 in 1957 and he subsequently began working as a blacksmith.

Sokulskyi started studying at the University of Lviv's faculty of philology in 1962. He joined the Lviv branch of the Artistic Youths' Club and began publishing poetry in multiple periodicals, including the almanac Vitryla, and the Flag magazine. He also translated Belarusian poetry, which was published in the Vitchyzna periodical. During his time in Lviv, Sokulskyi became part of the Sixtier movement.

Sokulskyi began studying at the University of Dnipropetrovsk in his third year, but was expelled on 13 May 1965 or May 1966 for supporting Ukrainian nationalism. He was also expelled from the Komsomol and came under surveillance by the KGB. Sokulskyi later attributed these events to being a response to a spiritual awakening.

== Dissident activities ==
After being expelled, Sokulskyi began printing samvydav. He collaborated with Petro Rozumnyi, a teacher in Dnipropetrovsk Oblast, on printing Ivan Dziuba's Internationalism or Russification?, and he also worked alongside other dissidents from Lviv and Kyiv.

Writer Oles Honchar came under Soviet government pressure for his work The Cathedral in 1968 due to individualist and pro-environmentalist sentiments. In response to the campaign against The Cathedral, Sokulskyi wrote an open letter alongside journalist Mykhailo Skoryk titled the Letter of the Artistic Youth of Dnipropetrovsk. The letter condemned the Soviet government, in particular Chairman of the Council of Ministers Volodymyr Shcherbytsky, for targeting Honchar and for Russification in Ukraine. Specifically, Sokulskyi and Skoryk noted the closure of Ukrainian-language schools and churches in Dnipropetrovsk Oblast, as well as the persecution of intellectuals. The letter acquired attention from the United States' Radio Liberty, which republished the document.

Sokulskyi was arrested in June 1969 for writing the Letter of the Artistic Youth of Dnipropetrovsk. On 17 January 1969 he was found guilty of anti-Soviet agitation and sentenced to four years in prison. He served out his sentence in the Mordovian Autonomous Soviet Socialist Republic, at Vladimir Central Prison, and in Perm Oblast before being released and allowed to return to Dnipropetrovsk Oblast. Upon his return, he married Orysa Lesiv, the sister of Greek Catholic priest and fellow political prisoner Yaroslav Lesiv. Sokulskyi had met and befriended Lesiv while imprisoned. Sokulskyi's prison sentence only hardened his devotion to activism, with historian Svitlana Martynova saying he "went to the camps as a poet [...] and returned from there a human rights activist." During his imprisonment, Sokulskyi was recognised as a prisoner of conscience by international human rights non-governmental organisation Amnesty International.

After his release from prison, Sokulskyi joined the Ukrainian Helsinki Group in October 1979. He continued to find work as a labourer, although he was frequently fired. In April 1980, Sokulskyi was arrested yet again, receiving a sentence of 10 years' imprisonment and 5 years' internal exile — the maximum legal sentence — as an "especially-dangerous state criminal". The official reason for the arrest was his poems "A Thought on Shevchenko", "Requiem" and "the Ruin". He served his sentence at the Chistopol prison and Perm-36. While still imprisoned, Sokulskyi was again arrested on 3 April 1985 and sentenced to a further three years' imprisonment on charges of hooliganism. During this time, he was repeatedly placed in solitary confinement.

== Release, political career and death ==
The wives of Ivan Sokulskyi and dissident Mykola Horbal launched a hunger strike on 13 July 1988 with the intention of bringing about their husbands' release from prison. The hunger strike attracted attention from Ukrainian society, and both Sokulskyi and Horbal were released in August of the same year. Following his release, Sokulskyi again returned to Dnipropetrovsk Oblast, where he became a leading activist in the growing cultural revival. During the 1989–1991 Ukrainian revolution he joined the Ukrainian Autocephalous Orthodox Church and co-founded the regional branches of the Taras Shevchenko Society for the Ukrainian Language, People's Movement of Ukraine and Memorial. He was also a member of the Ukrainian Helsinki Union and the Ukrainian Republican Party.

During a 20 May 1991 protest in support of Ukraine's independence from the Soviet Union, Sokulskyi was attacked and beaten by KGB events. His health seriously declined following the attack, and he eventually died on 22 June 1992 in the city of Dnipropetrovsk. He was buried in the village of Prydniprovske.
