= Chistopol Prison =

Prison in Chistopol, Russia

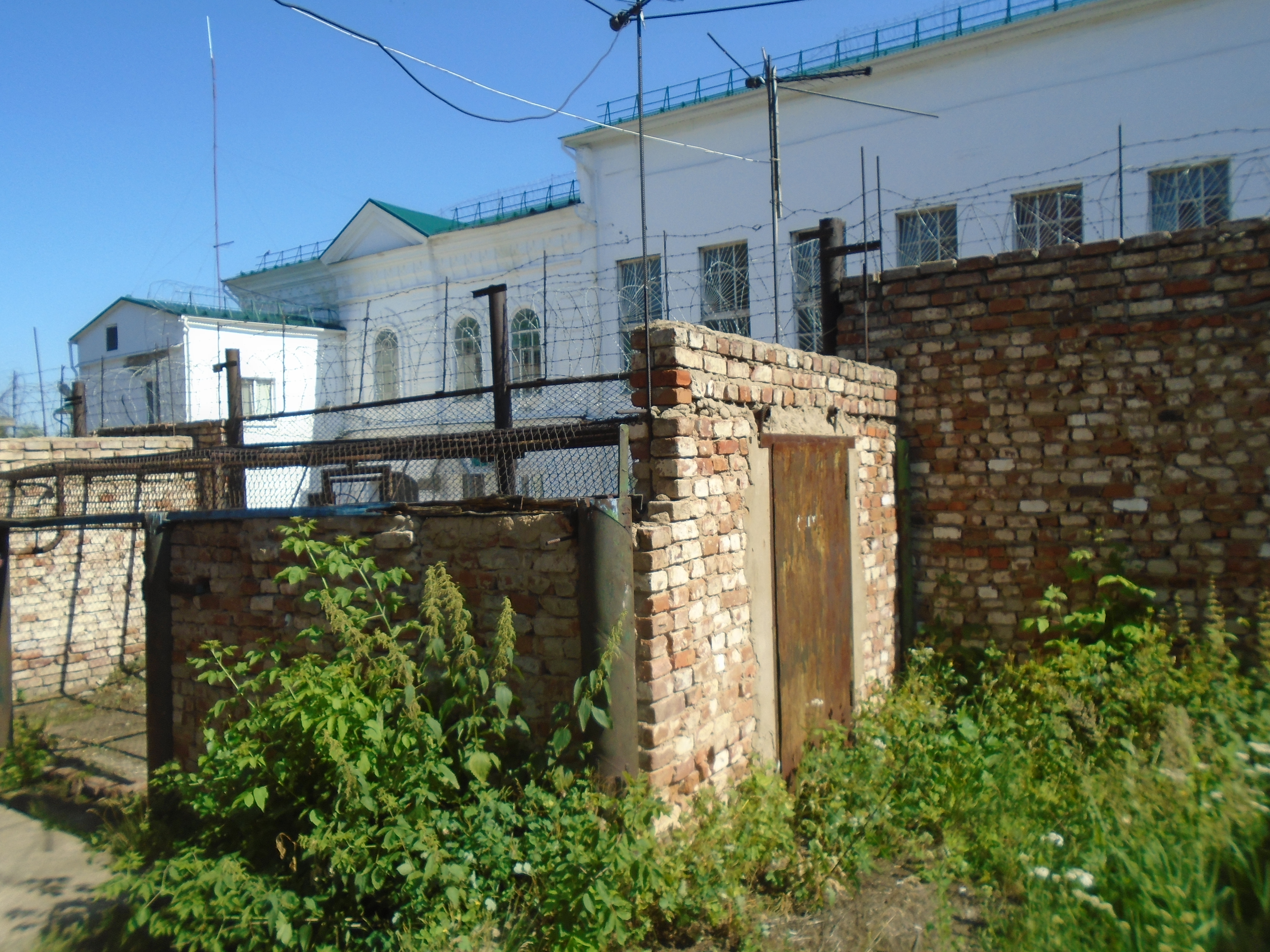
- View of the prison in July 2022
- Interactive map of Chistopol Prison
- Location: 1 Liebknekht str. Chistopol, Tatarstan Russia; 55°21′53″N 50°39′10″E
- Security class: Pre-trial detention facility
- Capacity: 522
- Opened: 8 October 1857
- Managed by: Federal Penitentiary Service

Chistopol Prison (Russian: Чистопольская тюрьма) (previously known as UE 148/T-4) is a prison located in Chistopol, Tatarstan in Russia. It is a pre-trial detention facility operated by the Federal Penitentiary Service since 2006, after significant reconstruction, as Regional Pre-trial Detention Facility No. 5 with a maximum capacity of 522 people.

Chistopol Prison is one of the oldest prisons in Russia with its first iteration opening in 1857. It is the most modern detention facility in Tatarstan, equipped with modern security equipment.

== History ==
The prison was built in 1855-1857. It was originally intended to hold 350 prisoners. It was also used as a transit prison for convicts being transported to Orenburg and the Urals. The main contingent was criminals whose sentences did not reach penal servitude.

During the Russian Civil War, the prison was intensively used by both the "Reds" and the "Whites". In 1918, the "Whites" arrested the Czech writer and commissar Jaroslav Hasek; a few weeks later, he was able to escape from prison by posing as someone else.

In the 1920s and 1930s, the Chistopol "correctional home" was used as a pre-trial detention center.

During the Great Patriotic War, the number of prisoners in the prison increased to one and a half to two thousand, including Volga Germans and deserters. The high density of prisoners contributed to mass illnesses and deaths: from November 1941 to March 1943 alone, 1,023 people died of illness and hunger. Immediately after the end of the war, the prison was converted into a special-purpose psychiatric hospital.

In 1953, the prison was rebuilt as a strict and special regime prison. A significant number of prisoners were Ukrainian nationalists, including the father, mother and sister of the head of counterintelligence of the OUN (b) Roman Shukhevych.

Since 1960, the main contingent of prisoners were criminals sentenced to a "special regime of detention".

In the early 1970s, the prison was rebuilt once again: the category of "special regime" was softened to "enhanced regime" (for previously unconvicted citizens who committed serious crimes for the first time). In order to re-educate convicts, the prison began to intensively develop production. A school and a vocational school appeared at the prison, as well as a new residential building, a boiler room, and garages.

== Notable prisoners ==
Since its inception, the Chistopol Prison held various prisoners. Among the famous prisoners:

- Anatoly Marchenko, Soviet dissident, died in Chistopol in 1986.
- Constantin Bivol, Bessarabian Romanian nationalist and member of the Sfatul Țării
- Igor Ogurtsov, founder and leader of VSKhSON.
- Ivan Sokulskyi, Ukrainian dissident
- Konstantin Päts, Estonian politician and President of Estonia
- Mykola Matusevych, Ukrainian dissident
- Natan Scharansky, Soviet Jewish dissident and later Minister of the Interior of Israel
- Sergei Grigoryants, Soviet dissident and journalist
- Vazif Meylanov, Soviet dissident and writer
- Valery Senderov, Soviet dissident and mathematician
- Viktor Nekipelov, Soviet dissident, human rights activist, and poet
- Alexey Smirnov, Soviet dissident, human rights activist.
- Sergei Kovalev, Soviet dissident
- Viktoras Petkus, Lithuanian dissident
- Jaroslav Hašek, Czech writer and Red Army commissar
