= Vitaliy Kalynychenko =

Ukrainian human rights activist

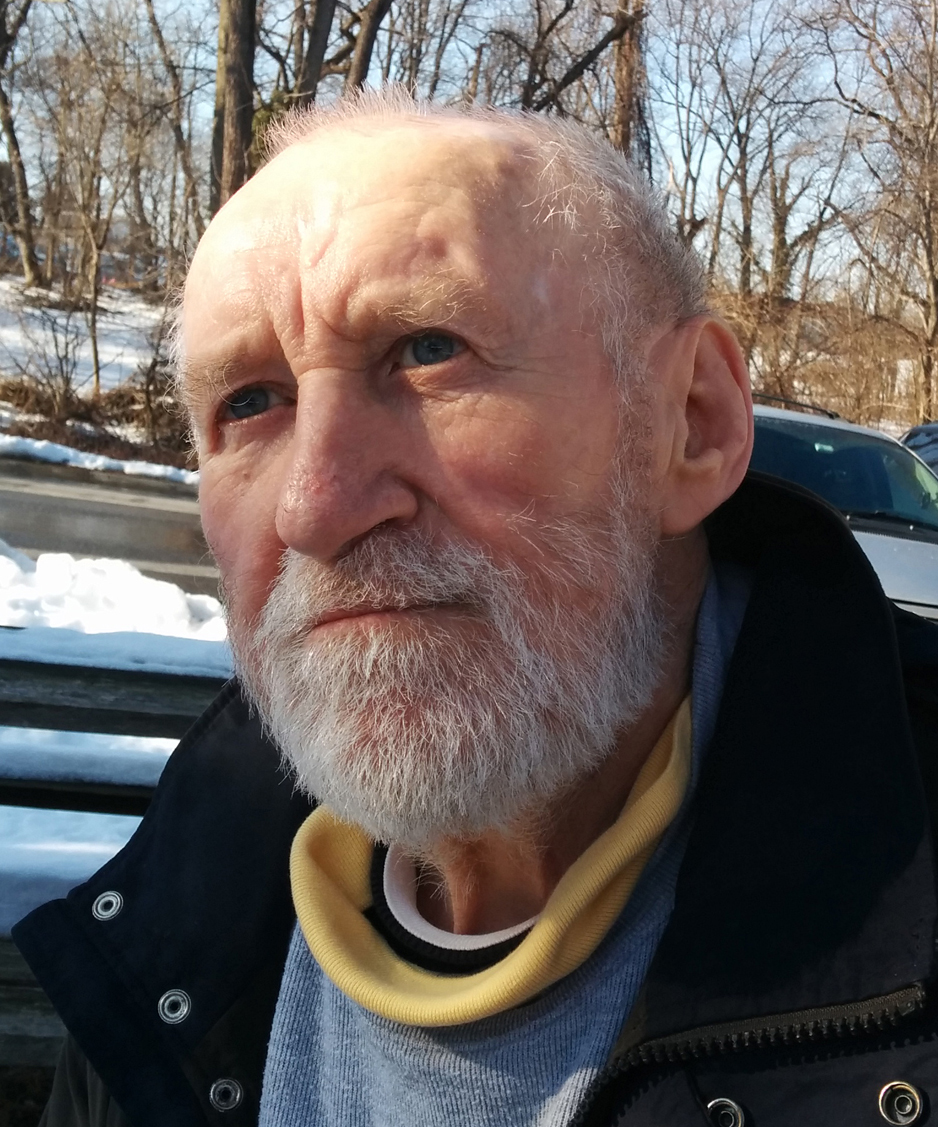
- Born: Kalynychenko Vitaliy; January 31, 1938; Vasylkivka, Vasylkivka Raion, Dnipropetrovsk Oblast
- Died: April 27, 2017 (aged 79); Silver Spring, Maryland
- Citizenship: Soviet Union United States
- Known for: Ukrainian Helsinki Group

Vitaliy Kalynychenko (Ukrainian: Віталій Калиниченко, January 31, 1938 - April 27, 2017) was a member of the Ukrainian Helsinki Group.

Kalynychenko's first transgression of Soviet law was his nonagreement to work for the KGB. He was approached in 1964 to act as an informant, but his unwillingness to do so caused him to be arrested by a fellow student in 1965. He was released without charge, and worked in Leningrad as an electrical engineer.

== Arrest and Sentencing ==
On July 20, 1966, Kalynychenko was caught trying to flee to Finland. He was taken to Moscow, where, according to standard Soviet procedure, his mental state was examined. He was ruled sane by the Serbsky Institute of General and Forensic Psychiatry in Moscow, and stood trial.

On January 12, 1967, Kalynychenko was charged with "attempting to betray his homeland", and was sentenced to 10 years in a harsh regime labour camp.

Kalynychenko protested to his sentence on the grounds that he had not been sentenced for trying to cross a border illegally, but rather that he was a political prisoner. In 1974, he sent an open letter in that effect to the presidium of the USSR (with a copy going to the United Nations).

== Ukrainian Helsinki Group ==
Kalynychenko joined the Ukrainian Helsinki Group on October 3, 1977.

Between October 17 and 27, 1977, Kalynychenko went on a hunger strike, demanding to be allowed to emigrate from the USSR.

On October 23, 1977, Kalynychenko sent a letter to the Supreme Soviet denouncing Soviet citizenship, military ticket, and university degree.

On April 7, 1978, Kalynychenko was arrested for Hooliganism. At the time, "hooliganism" was an umbrella term used by authorities to chastise non-membership in the communist party.

Kalynychenko could not find work, and appealed to the authorities for assistance.

== Second Arrest ==
On November 29, 1979, Kalynychenko was arrested a second time, and charged with distributing information of the Moscow Helsinki Group, the Ukrainian Helsinki Group, as well as Anti Soviet Agitation and Propaganda (for his denouncement of Soviet Citizenship).

On May 16, 1980, the Dnipropetrovsk Regional Court ruled that Kalynychenko was a repeat offender and he was sentenced to 10 years imprisonment and 5 years exile.

== Pardon during Glasnost ==
On April 7, 1988, Kalynychenko was pardoned by the Supreme Soviet of the Ukrainian SSR. He was released on April 18, 1988.

== Emigration to the US ==
In 1989, Kalynychenko and his wife Yaryna emigrated to the United States. He lived in Washington, D.C., until his death on April 27, 2017, at a senior care facility in Silver Spring, Maryland.
