= Kalynychenko =

Kalynychenko (Ukrainian: Калиниченко) or Kalinichenko (Ukrainian: Калініченко) is a Ukrainian surname. Notable people with the surname include:

- Anton Kalinitschenko (born 1982), Russian ski jumper
- Maksym Kalynychenko (born 1979), Ukrainian footballer
- Regina Kalinichenko (born 1985), Russian handball player
- Vitaliy Kalinichenko (born 1993), Ukrainian ski jumper
- Vitaliy Kalynychenko (1938–2017), Soviet-Ukrainian dissident
