= Vasylkivskyi Raion =

Vasylkivskyi Raion (Ukrainian: Васильківський район) may refer to:

- Vasylkiv Raion, a raion in Kyiv Oblast of Ukraine.
- Vasylkivka Raion, a former raion in Dnipropetrovsk Oblast of Ukraine.
