= Serhii Naboka =

Ukrainian Soviet dissident and journalist (1955–2003)

- Сергій Набока
- Born: 26 April 1955; Tula, Tula Oblast, Russian SFSR, Soviet Union
- Died: 18 January 2003 (aged 47); Vinnytsia, Ukraine
- Education: Taras Shevchenko University of Kyiv
- Occupations: Soviet dissident; journalist
- Employers: Radio Free Europe/Radio Liberty; The Voice of Revival
- Organization: Ukrainian Culturological Club
- Political party: Ukrainian Helsinki Union; People's Movement of Ukraine; Ukrainian Republican Party

Serhii Vadymovych Naboka (Ukrainian: Сергі́й Вади́мович Набо́ка; 26 April 1955 – 18 January 2003) was a Ukrainian Soviet dissident and journalist. He was the founder of The Voice of Revival, the first legal, uncensored newspaper in Ukraine since the foundation of the Soviet Union.

== Early life and career ==
Serhii Vadymovych Naboka was born 26 April 1955 in the city of Tula, Russia, to journalists Kateryna Mykhailivna Zelenska and Vadym Ivanovych Naboka. Shortly after his birth, his parents moved to the city of Kyiv. Serhii was a student at Kyiv's Secondary School No. 130 from 1962 to 1972. At the age of 13 or 14, Naboka read The State and Revolution by Vladimir Lenin; the work led him to develop anti-Soviet and anti-communist views. Later textbooks and state-sponsored literature led him to further question the official history of Ukraine. He later remarked that in reading Soviet literature, "Such a lie was revealed, even in something of a philosophical sense."

Naboka first applied to the Institute of Journalism at Taras Shevchenko University of Kyiv in 1972, along with the Faculty of Art History at the Kyiv Art Institute (now the National Academy of Visual Arts and Architecture). He was rejected from both, and he later worked as a freelance correspondent for Evening Kyiv and Molod Ukrayiny until 1974, when he was conscripted into the Soviet Army. Due to poor health, he served in an engineering battalion, variously working in Leningrad, Moscow and Riga. Naboka was alarmed by the 1972–1973 Ukrainian purge; like many Ukrainian youths at the time, he frequently listened to Western radio stations and participated in political debates. After his military service, Naboka became a student at Shevchenko University's journalism faculty in 1976.

== Dissident activities ==
While studying at Shevchenko University, Naboka published several works of samvydav, including Justice (Ukrainian: Хлам, romanized: Khlam), an artistic and literary journal directed towards youths, and a copy of Aleksandr Solzhenitsyn's "Spanish Interview" article. In 1978 or 1980, he co-founded the Kyiv Democratic Club, an informal group dedicated to philosophical, religious and literary discussions. In July 1980 Naboka wrote a leaflet for the club expressing opposition to the Soviet–Afghan War and support for the subsequent 1980 Summer Olympics boycott. In the leaflet, Naboka argued that the Soviet political system was one of "imperialism" and that the Soviet Union lacked democratic freedoms.

Naboka was arrested on 11 January 1981, while handing out fliers commemorating the Day of the Ukrainian Political Prisoner. On 29 June of the same year he was sentenced to three years' imprisonment under Article 187-1 of the criminal code of the Ukrainian SSR. He remained imprisoned for three years before being released in 1984, after which he worked as a janitor, librarian and in transportation. During perestroika, Naboka returned to political activity, advocating for the revival of the Ukrainian Autocephalous Orthodox Church.

In the autumn of 1987, Naboka co-founded the Ukrainian Culturological Club with Oles Shevchenko and Leonid Miliavskyi, both of whom were also former political prisoners. At the time, it was the first non-governmental organisation to operate in Kyiv. It was later followed by the Lviv-based Ukrainian Helsinki Union (UHS), which included the Ukrainian Culturological Club.

Naboka was briefly a correspondent for Atmoda, the newspaper of the Popular Front of Latvia, between 1988 and 1990. During this time, Naboka set out to create an official press organ for the UHS. The result was The Voice of Revival, Ukraine's first uncensored and legally-published newspaper since 1920. The newspaper was immediately popular; thousands of copies were distributed, leading state-sponsored newspapers to loosen restrictions on reporting in an effort to match the newspaper's success. Naboka's activism was regarded negatively by the Soviet government; during an April 1988 rally for environmental protections after the Chernobyl disaster, he was abducted by plainclothes policemen and interrogated by a member of the KGB. Naboka later recalled the meeting as such:

He said that you are our number four or three to arrest. And I ended up in such sympathetic company as Khmara, Chornovil and others. I really liked it... He said, 'but you are not extremists in the Culturological Club, you don't bring up the question of "Ukrainian self-governance".' The next day, I gathered the Club and said, 'Listen, let's not forget that our goal is a self-governing Ukraine.'

Naboka became a political commentator on Radio Liberty in 1989. The same year, he became director of Republic, the first private news agency in Ukraine. Between 1989 and 1990, he was a member of the People's Movement of Ukraine and the Ukrainian Republican Party.

== After independence ==
Following the dissolution of the Soviet Union, Naboka refused to involve himself in politics, returning to journalism. The Voice of Revival was handed over to the Ukrainian Republican Party, while Naboka focused full-time on the establishment of Radio Liberty offices in Kyiv. He returned to Republic, which began broadcasting news programmes on the UTaR channel. Naboka had plans to expand Republic's presence in Ukraine's news space, but these were disrupted by Leonid Kuchma's election as President of Ukraine; Kuchma took measures to restrict press freedom, including via tax audits, police raids and closures of independent media stations. Beginning in 1999, Naboka also hosted the programme "Human Rights: Ukrainian Reality" on Radio Liberty, as part of which he interviewed individuals who felt that their human rights were being violated by the government. Naboka continued to be a popular television presenter and journalist during the mid- to late 1990s and early 2000s.

During a business trip to the prison where he had formerly been imprisoned, Naboka suddenly died from acute heart failure on 18 January 2003. He was buried at Baikove Cemetery on 21 January 2003. Human Rights: Ukrainian Reality was his protégée Nadiia Sherstiuk following his death, but was closed after the 2004–2005 Orange Revolution. According to journalist Serhii Hrabovskyi, the programme was closed by the United States government after it was determined that human rights in Ukraine was no longer a priority.

On 30 July 2020, the Kyiv City Council issued a resolution renaming an unnamed square between Yevhen Sverstiuk Street and Raisa Okipna Street. 18 January 2024, the City Council voted to rename an adjacent street in the city after Naboka as part of efforts to Derussify local place names in the city. The street had previously been named after Pavel Bazhov.
