= Myroslav Marynovych =

Ukrainian educator and human rights activist

- Мирослав Маринович
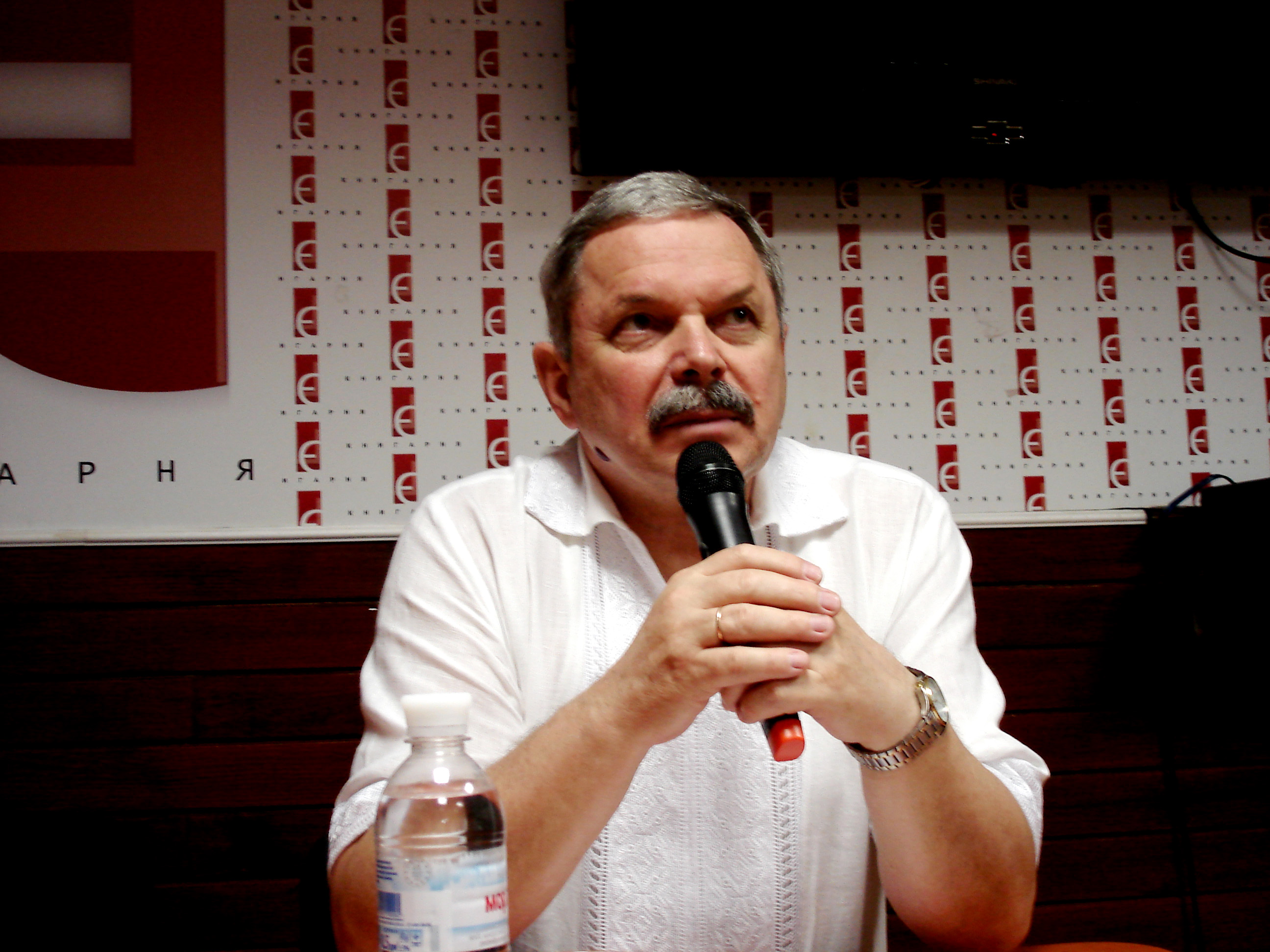
- Marynovych in 2013
- Born: 4 January 1949 (age 77); Komarovychi, Lviv Oblast, USSR (now Ukraine)
- Education: Lviv Polytechnic Institute
- Occupations: vice-rector of the Ukrainian Catholic University, lecturer, social activist
- Known for: human rights activism with participation in the Ukrainian Helsinki Group
- Movement: Soviet dissidents
- Awards: Member of the Order of Liberty; Vasyl Stus Prize, Truman-Reagan Medal of Freedom

Myroslav Frankovych Marynovych (Ukrainian: Миросла́в Фра́нкович Марино́вич; born 4 January 1949) is a Ukrainian educator, human rights activist, and former Soviet dissident, and longtime vice-rector of the Ukrainian Catholic University in Lviv. The co-founder of Amnesty International Ukraine, Marynovych was a founding member of the Ukrainian Helsinki Group.

== Early life ==
Marynovych was born on 4 January 1949, in the village of Komarovychi of Staryi Sambir Raion of Drohobych Oblast (now Lviv Oblast). His grandfather was a priest of the Ukrainian Greek Catholic Church and his family was very religious.

In Drohobych he attended high school, from which he graduated with a gold medal. Then he worked as an exempt secretary of Komsomol at a plant in Drohobych for a year.

In 1967, Myroslav Marynovych began studying at the Lviv Polytechnic Institute. At the institute, he spoke out against the Soviet government. As a result of this, his first meeting with the KGB took place in 1970.

== Career ==
In 1972 he graduated from Lviv Polytechnic and worked as a translator for English at the Ivano-Frankivsk plant "Positron". At the same time he met with dissidents from Lviv and Kyiv. On 22 May 1973, he was arrested and searched by police in Kyiv when he laid flowers at the monument to Taras Shevchenko.

Afterwards he was conscripted into the Soviet Army, where he served from 1973 to 1974 in Vologda.

After his release from the army, Marynovych moved to Kyiv in 1974. He worked as a technical editor for the magazine pochatkova shkola (Elementary school) and at publishing house Tekhnika, where he was fired by KGB order. He was unemployed for some time. Before his arrest, he arranged to stick posters.

== Prison time ==
In 1976, Marynovych met Mykola Matusevych, and became a founding member of the Ukrainian Helsinki Group. Since then he was repeatedly detained by police in Kyiv and Serpukhov. Searches were conducted in Drohobych, and he was constantly threatened. Eventually, because of their membership, Marynovych and Matusevych were arrested on 23 April 1977, on the charge of "Anti-Soviet agitation and propaganda". At the trial and sentencing he denied any guilt. After 11 months he was finally convicted and sentenced to the maximum term - seven years of severe security camps and five years in exile.

Marynovych was in the camp Perm VS-389/36-2 in Perm Oblast. There he took part in all human rights actions, held hunger strikes, including a 20-day protest, and narrated a camp chronicle. For the whole term he had about 150 days of solitary confinement in a ShIZO cell (ШИЗО, from Штрафной ИЗОлятор/Shtrafioi Izolyator). In 1978, Amnesty International identified Marynovych as a prisoner of conscience. After completing his seven years imprisonment in April 1984, Marynovych was exiled to the village of Saralzhin in the Oiyl District of Aktobe region of Kazakhstan, where he worked as a carpenter. He married Lyuba Kheina, who travelled from Kyiv to join him in exile.

== Later activities ==
In 1987, he returned to western Ukraine, and worked in an oil refinery in Drohobych. He also worked as a reporter in the local newspaper, Halytska Zorya (The Star of Halych; Ukrainian: Галицька Зоря).

Also in 1991 Marynovych founded the first Amnesty International group in the USSR and served as its head till 1996. From 1993 to 1997 he served as chairperson of the National Committee.

In 1997, he became the founding director of the Institute of Religion and Society at the Lviv Theological Academy (after 2002, known as the Ukrainian Catholic University), and since 2007 he has been the president of the institute. From 2000 to 2005 he served as Vice-Rector for External Affairs at the Ukrainian Catholic University.

In 2010 he became the president of the Ukrainian centre of PEN International and served until 2014; he now holds the title of honorary president.

== Publications ==
Marynovych's first published work came out in 1990, titled The Gospel According to God's Fool. This work had been written while he was serving in exile, and was later translated into German and French.

In 1991, his second work was published, entitled Ukraine on the Margins of the Holy Scripture (Ukrainian: Україна на полі Святого Письма).

In 1993 - "The Atonement of Communism", "Ukraine: Road through the Desert".

== Books ==
- Marynovych, Myroslav; Hluzman, Semen; Antoniuk, Zynovyi (1997). Lysty z voli [Letters from freedom] (in Ukrainian). Kyiv: Sfera. ISBN 9789667267636.
- Marynovych, Myroslav (2004). An ecumenist analyzes the history and prospects of religion in Ukraine. Lviv: Ukrainian Catholic University Press. ISBN 9668197127.
- Merdjanova, Ina; Vavilova, Rota; Marynovych, Myroslav (2005). Religion in post-communist Europe. Universitair Centrum Sint-Ignatius Antwerpen.
- Myroslav Marynovych (15 May 2021). Anonymous (ed.). The Universe behind Barbed Wire: Memoirs of a Ukrainian Soviet Dissident. Translated by Anonymous. Rochester: University of Rochester Press. ISBN 978-1-58046-981-4. OL 33862291M. Wikidata Q106756887. Translation of 2016 Ukrainian-language version.

== Awards ==
Among his awards, Myroslav Marynovych received a prize from the journal Suchasnist (“Modernity”) for his political science report “Atoning for Communism” (1993), the Valerii Marchenko award from the Ukrainian-American Bureau for Protection of Human Rights for the best human rights publication (1995), the Vladimir Zhabotinsky Medal for the promotion of inter-ethnic understanding from the Ukraine-Israel Society (1999), the Sergio Vieira de Mello Humanitarian Award (2013), and the Truman-Reagan Medal of Freedom (2014).

Marynovych has received many educational awards, including fellowships at Columbia University (USA), the World Council of Churches (Switzerland), and the Catholic University of Nijmegen (The Netherlands).

=== State awards ===
- The Order of Liberty (2008)
- The First Class of the Order For Courage (2006)

== Video ==
- Marynovych's speech at the conference "Nonconformism and Dissent in the Soviet Bloc", Day 1, Panel 1, 84 min on YouTube
- LECTURE: "CONTEMPORARY UKRAINE: TRANSFORMATION UNDER FIRE" WITH MYROSLAV MARYNOVYCH
- Myroslav Marynovych received the Truman-Reagan Medal of Freedom in Washington, D.C.
- Victims of Communism Memorial Foundation, Witness Project: Myroslav Marynovych
- Witness Project: Myroslav Marynovich (Full Interview)
- Columbia University, Myroslav Marynovych "Moral Aspects of the Dissident Resistance in Ukraine: From Rosy Expectations to Sober Reality"
- Bohdan Havrylyshyn Charity Foundation, “Truth, Freedom, National Identity” by Myroslav Marynovych
