= Oles Shevchenko =

Ukrainian journalist, human rights activist, politician, and former Soviet dissident

- Олесь Шевченко
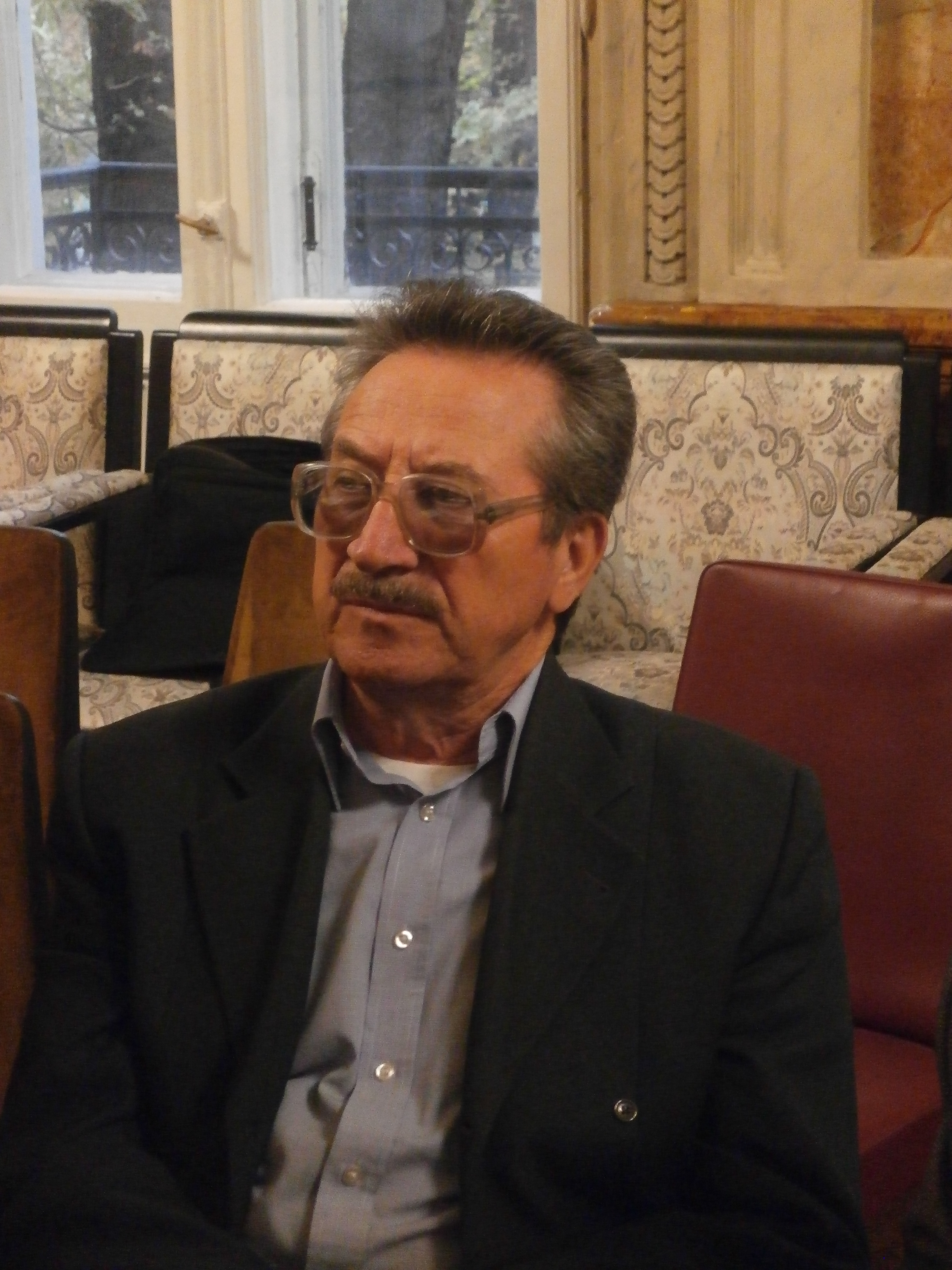
- Shevchenko in 2015

People's Deputy of Ukraine
- In office 15 May 1990 – 10 May 1994
- Preceded by: Office established
- Succeeded by: Yaroslav Fedoryn (Note: According to the Verkhovna Rada. According to the Kharkiv Human Rights Protection Group, Shevchenko was succeeded by Volodymyr Chemerys.)
- Constituency: Kyiv, Holosiivskyi District

Personal details
- Born: Oles Yevhenovych Shevchenko; 22 February 1940 (age 86) Skvyra, Ukrainian SSR, Soviet Union (now Ukraine)
- Party: Ukrainian People's Party (since 1999)
- Other political affiliations: Ukrainian Helsinki Union (1988–1990); Democratic Bloc; Ukrainian Republican Party (1990–1995); People's Movement of Ukraine (1997–1999); Organisation of Ukrainian Nationalists (since 1995); Our Ukraine Bloc
- Education: Taras Shevchenko State University of Kyiv

Military service
- Allegiance: Soviet Union
- Branch/service: Soviet Army
- Years of service: 1961–1964

Oles Yevhenovych Shevchenko (Ukrainian: Олесь Євгенович Шевченко; born 22 February 1940) is a Ukrainian journalist, human rights activist, politician, and former Soviet dissident who served as a People's Deputy of Ukraine from Kyiv's Holosiivskyi District from 1990 to 1994. Prior to his election, he was a member of the Ukrainian Helsinki Group and an editor for underground newspaper The Ukrainian Herald.

== Early life and career ==
Oles Yevhenovych Shevchenko was born on 22 February 1940 to an ethnically-Ukrainian family in the city of Skvyra. His father was a military officer in the Red Army that had fought in the Russian Civil War, the Winter War, and World War II. Oles began working in 1957 as a worker on a kolkhoz in Brovky, later studying at the journalism institute of Taras Shevchenko University from 1960 to 1969. He served in the Soviet Army for three years, from 1961 to 1964. Shevchenko worked as an editor of the Ukrainian Biochemical Journal under the Academy of Sciences of the Soviet Union from 1969 until his 1980 arrest.

== Dissident activities and imprisonment ==
Shevchenko began to support the Soviet dissidents in 1965, following the mass arrests of Ukrainian intellectuals that had happened that year. In 1973, following another series of arrests, he established the "United Revolutionary Front", a short-lived underground group which circulated samvydav in an effort to bring about an uprising against Soviet rule. The organisation lasted for a year without being discovered before it dissolved.

Following the arrest of Viacheslav Chornovil, Shevchenko became an editor for The Ukrainian Herald, an underground independent newspaper that Chornovil had overseen. Shevchenko was one of three editors working on the Herald following Chornovil's arrest, along with Stepan Khmara and Vitalii Shevchenko. Oles provided a significant boost to the newspaper, as his affiliation with the Soviet Academy of Sciences allowed him to be present during discussions involving high-ranking members of the Soviet government. The Herald as it was edited by both Shevchenkos and Khmara was more radically anti-communist and uncompromising than Chornovil's, and it was published from 1973 until 1975.

Shevchenko was arrested on 1 April 1980 for his work on the Herald and membership of the Ukrainian Helsinki Group. On 5 April, Shevchenko suffered a heart attack following an interrogation and was hospitalised, leading him to unsuccessfully attempt to sue the Soviet government. He was convicted on 24 December of that year on charges of anti-Soviet agitation. He was sentenced to five years of corrective labour in Perm Oblast, as well as three years of internal exile in the Kazakh Soviet Socialist Republic. He served his sentence in Perm-35, Perm-36, and Perm-37, and later lived in exile in Kazakhstan's Guryev Region (now Atyrau Region). During his prison sentence, Shevchenko continued to protest for the rights of political prisoners, writing several petitions and open letters. In one instance, after his arm was injured, he began wearing a winter coat earlier than was permitted. After ignoring several warnings from guards not to wear it, the coat was torn off, again injuring Shevchenko's arm and leading to a prison strike among Ukrainian political prisoners.

Shevchenko was pardoned on 30 April 1987, allowing him to return to Ukraine. He subsequently returned to dissident activity, organising the Ukrainian Culturological Club and the Ukrainian Helsinki Union.

== Political career ==
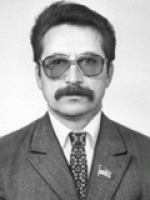
Shevchenko in 1990 as a member of the Verkhovna Rada

Shevchenko first ran in the 1990 Ukrainian Supreme Soviet election as part of the Democratic Bloc coalition, representing the Holosiivskyi District on behalf of Shevchenko University. During his time in the Verkhovna Rada, he was a member of the state sovereignty commission. He changed his constituency in the 1994 Ukrainian parliamentary election to Tarashcha Raion, allowing Volodymyr Chemerys or Yaroslav Fedoryn to run for his seat as he sought to remove Oleksandr Moroz. However, he was unsuccessful, and lost his seat in the Verkhovna Rada. Shevchenko has since been an unsuccessful candidate in multiple other elections. He ran for the 96th electoral district as a member of the People's Movement of Ukraine in 1998, for the 194th electoral district as a member of the Our Ukraine Bloc in 2002, and as a member of the Ukrainian National Bloc of Kostenko and Plyushch in 2006.

From 1990 to 1995, Shevchenko was a member of the Ukrainian Republican Party, leading its Kyiv branch. He joined the Organisation of Ukrainian Nationalists in 1995, and was a member of People's Movement of Ukraine from 1997. He supported Yuriy Kostenko during the party's 1999 split, joining the Ukrainian People's Party, and he is a member of its central committee. Shevchenko is a supporter of the Orthodox Church of Ukraine.
