= Ukrainian Culturological Club =

Soviet non-governmental organisation

- Український культурологічний клуб
- Successor: Ukrainian Helsinki Union
- Formation: 8 June 1987; 38 years ago
- Founded at: Obolonskyi District
- Dissolved: 7 July 1988; 37 years ago
- Purpose: Cultural and historical studies
- Location: Kyiv, Ukrainian Soviet Socialist Republic
- Council chair: Serhii Naboka

The Ukrainian Culturological Club (Ukrainian: Український культурологічний клуб, romanized: Ukrainskyi kulturolohichnyi klub; abbreviated UKK) was a Ukrainian non-governmental organisation in the Soviet Union. The first non-governmental organisation in the Ukrainian Soviet Socialist Republic, the UKK predominantly focused on publicising an independent Ukrainian cultorology and historiography, as well as environmental causes.

== History ==
The Ukrainian Culturological Club was established on 8 June 1987 at a meeting of several Ukrainian Soviet dissidents in the Liubava coffeehouse, in the Obolonskyi District of the city of Kyiv. Present at the meeting were Olha Heiko-Matusevych, Larysa Lokhvytska, Leonid Miliavskyi, Serhii Naboka, Oles Shevchenko, Vitalii Shevchenko and Yevhen Sverstiuk, among others. Naboka was selected as the group's "council chair" (Ukrainian: голова ради, romanized: holova rady). The UKK was based in Dnieper Ukraine, in contrast to the Galician origins of much of Ukraine's dissident movement.

At a 16 August meeting of the UKK's members, a statute was published, saying that the group's concern was in the "field of studying and spreading Ukrainian culture, expanding a generally-scientific worldview, and providing assistance in self-education, self-improvement and meaningful leisure activities." Word soon spread throughout Kyiv about the UKK's activities, leading to their membership rapidly increasing. They moved their meetings to the Contemporary concert hall at Kyiv's Frunze Park (now Kurenivka Park), where as many as 500 were in attendance. Issues raised at the Contemporary meetings included environmental protection and preservation of historical buildings.

The Soviet government initially provided legal recognition to the group, but following a 18 October 1987 editorial condemning the club in the Evening Kyiv newspaper, the government began denying them the right to hold events. The UKK continued to meet in members' apartment flats or in open-air settings on a weekly basis. Members commonly discussed differences between Soviet historiography and fact, such as the Russification of Ukraine, the causes of the Holodomor, political repressions against Ukrainian dissidents and the activities of Ukrainian nationalist politicians Mykhailo Hrushevsky, Volodymyr Vynnychenko and Symon Petliura. Culture was also a frequent topic of conversation, including the Executed Renaissance, the Sixtiers, and the cultural impact of events such as the revival of the Ukrainian Autocephalous Orthodox Church and the 1986 Chernobyl disaster.

The UKK's members were subject to constant monitoring by the Ukrainian KGB, and while the escalation of perestroika prevented the KGB from fully cracking down on their activities, they undertook several measures to hamper their organisation. During one July 1988 protest, UKK activists calling for the release of political prisoners during a march on October Revolution Square (now Maidan Nezalezhnosti) were abducted by plainclothes KGB officers and dropped off in fields and forests outside of Kyiv. It remains unclear if these abductions were attempted enforced disappearances or intimidation tactics.

Throughout 1988, the UKK continued to protest in Kyiv, primarily concerning itself with environmental measures such as denuclearisation and opposition to the construction of another nuclear power plant in Ukraine. At this time, other dissidents (including dissident leader Viacheslav Chornovil) began attending UKK meetings, with people from southern cities like Odesa and Dnipropetrovsk attending meetings. Chornovil also published reports of the club's meetings in The Ukrainian Herald, a samvydav newspaper he was chief editor of. The UKK merged into the Ukrainian Helsinki Union upon its formation on 7 July 1988.
