= Serhiy Podolynsky =

Ukrainian academic (1850–1891)

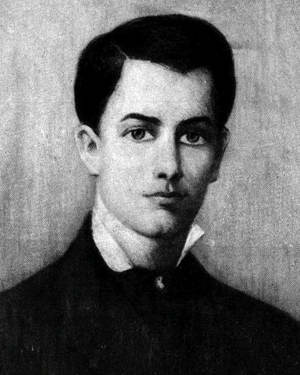
- Born: July 19, 1850; Nova Yaroslavka, Russian Empire
- Died: July 12, 1891 (aged 40); Kyiv
- Resting place: Zvirynets Cemetery
- Citizenship: Russian Empire
- Education: Kyiv University; University of Wrocław
- Known for: Labour theory of value based on embodied energy
- Scientific career
- Fields: Medicine, sociology, economy

Serhiy Podolynsky (Ukrainian: Сергі́й Подоли́нський) (19 July 1850 – 12 July 1891) was a Ukrainian socialist, physician, sociologist and an early pioneer of ecological economics. He set out to reconcile socialist thought with the second law of thermodynamics by synthesising the approaches of Karl Marx, Charles Darwin and Sadi Carnot. In his essay "Socialism and the Unity of Physical Forces" (1880), Podolynsky theorized a labor theory of value based on embodied energy.

== Biography ==
Serhiy Podolynskyi was born in the village of Yaroslavka in the region of Cherkasy, where his parents' manor was located. His father Andriy Podolynskyi was a Russian Romantic poet who stemmed from Kyiv and resided in Ukraine, and his mother belonged to higher nobility. In 1867 Serhiy enrolled into Kyiv University, where he studied at the faculty of natural sciences and got acquainted with Mykhailo Drahomanov and Nikolai Ziber. During that time Podolynskyi became a proponent of liberal ideas.

After graduating in 1871, he moved abroad for studies of medicine, and in the following years resided in Paris, London, Zurich, Vienna and Breslau. During that time he cooperated with Russian narodnik activist Pyotr Lavrov, and met Karl Marx and Friedrich Engels. Representing the socialist left wing of the Ukrainian Hromada, Podolynskyi established contacts with the Sich student society, and in 1875 together with Ostap Terletskyi organized the publication of socialist literature in the Ukrainian language. His popular works issued during that time were spread around Galicia, causing, among others, caused the court process against the group of Ivan Franko in 1877-1878, and in Dnieper Ukraine.

In 1876 Podolynskyi graduated as a Doctor of Medicine in Breslau and returned to his native village, where he organized a hospital for the common people. He also took part in the activities of Kyiv Hromada, contributing to the more revolutionary attitude of its younger generation. Forced to emigrate, in 1877 Podolynskyi moved to Montpellier in France, where he worked as a doctor. In 1878 together with Mykhailo Drahomanov and Mykhailo Pavlyk he organized the publication of Hromada magazine. His works also appeared internationally, in journals including Slovo, La Revue Socialiste, La Réforme and Die Neue Zeit. Starting from 1881, Podolynskyi suffered from mental illness. After unsuccessfully seeking treatment in Paris, he had to return to Kyiv, where he died in 1891.

== Views ==
Podolynskyi was one of the first Ukrainian figures to popularize Socialism and Marxism. Influenced by the Russian narodniks, he developed a distinct theory of his own on the base of conditions observed by him in Ukraine. Podolynskyi applied the observations made by Marx on the example of industrial workers to explain the sociopolitical situation and needs of Ukrainian peasantry. He supported communalism and promoted socialization of lands and factories by transferring their management to the producing classes - peasants and workers respectively.

Contrary to Marx, Podolynskyi denied the concept of added value, stating that human labour can only change the properties of natural objects, but is unable to create new matter. According to him, resources available to humans can increase their quantity only due to the work of photosynthesis through transformation of the energy produced by the Sun. Podolynskyi's theory, based on ideas of physiocracy, is frequently mentioned in context of the noosphere concept introduced by Vladimir Vernadsky.

== Legacy ==
The results of Podolynskyi's analysis were supported by Karl Marx and possibly influenced the last volume of Das Kapital. Engels, however, refused to recognize them and called Podolynskyi a "deviationist", a point of view later supported by the Bolsheviks. Podolynskyi's texts, especially utopia The Steam Engine (1876), which promoted the establishment of Socialism as a prerequisite for the demolition of imperial rule over Ukrainians and cessation of their exploitation by landlords and capitalists, had a great influence on the emerging Ukrainian national movement. Among his ideological followers was the Ukrainian educational and political activist Borys Hrinchenko. Anti-Soviet dissident Mykola Rudenko would develop Podolynskyi's ideas on added value in order to demonstrate the unsustainability of the Soviet economy, and founded a scientific society named after him.

== Bibliography ==
- Про хліборобство ("On Agriculture"), 1874
- Парова машина ("The Steam Engine"), 1875
- Про багатство та бідність ("On Wealth and Poverty"), 1876
- Про Правду ("On Truth")
- Правдиве слово хлібороба до своїх земляків ("True word of an agrarian to his compatriots")
- Життя і здоровʼя людей на Україні ("Life and Health of the People in Ukraine"), 1879
- Ремесла і фабрики на Україні ("Crafts and Factories in Ukraine"), 1880
- "Le Socialisme et la Théorie de Darwin (Socialism and the Theory of Darwin)," La Revue Socialiste, issue 3, 1880. pp. 129-148.
- "Le Socialisme et l'unité des forces physiques (Socialism and the Unity of Physical Forces)," La Revue Socialiste, issue 8, June 1880. pp. 353-365.
- "Menschliche arbeit und einheit der kraft (Human Labor and the Unity of Physical Forces)," Die Neue Zeit, September-October 1883. pp. 413-424, 449-457.
