= Mykhailo Melnyk =

Ukrainian historian, poet, and human rights activist

Mykhailo Spyrydonovych Melnyk
- Михайло Спиридонович Мельник
- Born: March 14, 1944; Ordyntsi, Pohrebyshche Raion, Vinnytsia Oblast, Ukrainian SSR, Soviet Union
- Died: March 10, 1979 (aged 34); Pohreby, Brovary Raion, Kyiv Oblast, Ukrainian SSR, Soviet Union
- Cause of death: Suicide
- Citizenship: Soviet
- Education: Historian
- Alma mater: Taras Shevchenko National University of Kyiv, NASU Institute of History of Ukraine (graduate school)
- Occupations: Historian, poet, human rights activist
- Organization: Ukrainian Helsinki Group
- Known for: human rights activism with participation in the Ukrainian Helsinki Group
- Movement: dissident movement in the Soviet Union
- Awards: Order For Courage

Mykhailo Spyrydonovych Melnyk (Ukrainian: Миха́йло Спиридо́нович Ме́льник; 14 March 1944 – 10 March 1979) was a Ukrainian historian, poet, human rights activist, dissident and member of the Ukrainian Helsinki Group. He was an author of a book about the history of Ukraine, which was confiscated by the KGB.

On November 8, 2006, he was posthumously awarded the Order For Courage 1st class by the order of President of Ukraine. On December 25, 2015, a street in Brovary was named after him.

== Biography ==
Mykhailo Melnyk was born in the peasant family. In 1967 he graduated from Taras Shevchenko National University of Kyiv and became a history teacher. Soon he began his postgraduate education in the Institute of History of Academy of Science of Ukrainian SSR, however in 1972 he was excluded from the institute for reading his poems near the monument to Taras Shevchenko in Kyiv at the anniversary of the reburial of Shevchenko's body in Ukraine. In 1973 he was fired from his teacher work and excluded from the Communist Party of the Soviet Union.

He lived in the village of Pohreby in Kyiv Oblast with his family. He worked as a guard there. He continued to take part in protests against repressions of Ukrainian writers and human rights activists. He often contacted press asking them to report human rights violations.

On July 14, 1978, while visiting Kyiv, he was detained and searched by the law enforcement. On October 24, 1978, government officials tried to charge him with an attempt to rob a store. KGB officers who held the investigation proposed him a help to find a job in his profession if he ceased all contacts with other human right activist Oksana Meshko.

On November 3, 1978, Mykhailo Melnyk became a member of Ukrainian Helsinki Group. On February 16, 1979, he sent letters to the newspapers "Radianska Ukrayina" and "Molod Ukrayiny" asking to intervene in the case of human rights activist Vasyl Ovsiyenko. On March 6 and 7, 1979 law enforcement performed searches at the houses of many Ukrainian human rights activists and writers under the investigation against human rights activist and writer Oles Berdnyk, including the search in the house of Mykhailo Melnyk. All his scientific and art works, which consisted of 15 folders, were confiscated.

== Suicide ==
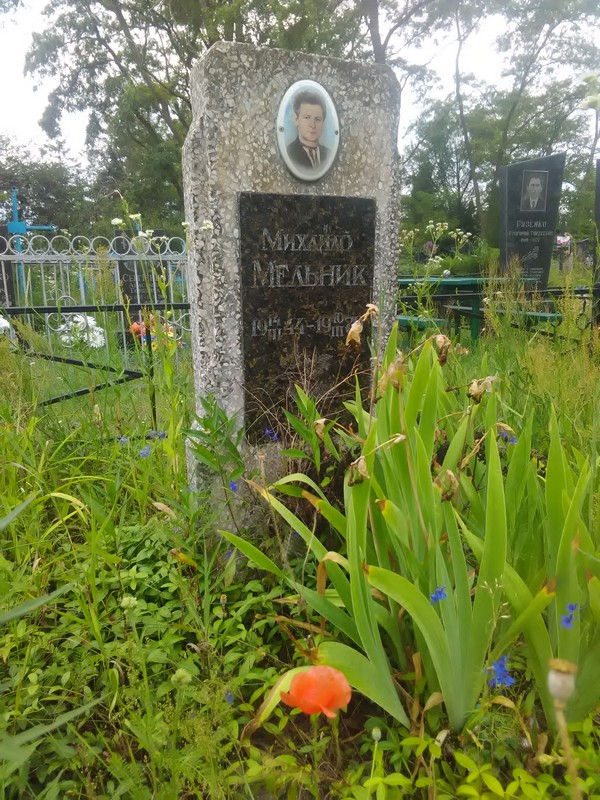
Grave of Mykhaylo Melnyk in Pohreby, 2016

On March 10, 1979, several days after the search, Mykhailo Melnyk wrote a farewell letter to his wife and committed suicide to save his family from further persecutions. Mykhailo Melnyk was buried on March 11 in the cemetery in Pohreby. The funeral took part under the supervision of KGB officers. His friends Pavlo Stokotelny and Oksana Meshko, who wanted to attend the funeral, were detained by KGB on the way to it. Stokotelny was questioned about the case of Oles Berdnyk and Meshko was just held in the KGB office with no reason.

The KGB continued to put pressure on the family of Melnyk, warning his widow to keep away from "unreliable" people.
