= Oksana Meshko =

Oksana Yakivna Meshko (Ukrainian: Оксана Якiвна Мешко, 30 January 1905 — 2 January 1991) was a Ukrainian human rights activist and Soviet dissident who on 9 November 1976 became one of the co-founders of the Ukrainian Public Group to Promote the Implementation of the Helsinki Accords, colloquially known as the Ukrainian Helsinki Group.

Meshko was born in 1905 in Stari Sanzhary, currently Poltava Oblast, Ukraine. Her father was executed in 1920 in the aftermath of the Civil war. Meshko graduated in 1931 with chemistry degree in Dnipropetrovsk. During the studies, she married Fedir Serhiienko, they had two sons, Yevhen and Oleksandr (Oles). Her husband was jailed in 1935, released in 1936 but could not find a job in Dnipropetrovsk and moved to Tambov. In 1937 Meshko, who was working in the chemical lab of an agricultural institute, lost her job and moved with the children to Tambov. During the war, her son Yevhen was killed by a bomb, and her husband was mobilized and returned as a disabled person. In 1944, the family moved to Kyiv.

In 1947, Meshko and her sister Vira were arrested and charged with the preparation of an assassination attempt of Nikita Khrushchev, then the First Secretary of the Communist Party of Ukraine. They were eventually sentenced for 10 years in jail. Meshko served her sentence in Ukhta and returned to Kyiv in 1956; in the same year she was rehabilitated. Her husband died soon afterwards. In the 1960s, she started activities aimed at popularizing Ukrainian culture; these activities were not illegal but also were not approved by authorities and therefore considered nationalist and dangerous. Her son, who participated in the same activities, was excluded from the university, and in 1970 lost his job. In 1971, Meshko's apartment in Kyiv was searched by the security forces, and in 1972 Oles Meshko was arrested.

After Helsinki Accords was signed in 1975, Soviet dissident started to think about organizations which would document how Soviet authorities comply with the requirements of this document. The Moscow Helsinki Group was formed first, and, organized by Mykola Rudenko, the Ukrainian Helsinki Group was formed on 9 November 1976. Oksana Meshko became one of the co-founders. In 1977, most of the group members, including Rudenko, were arrested, and it was decided not to elect a new group head. Meshko took the coordination of the activities of the group. In the two first years of the activity of the group, her apartment was searched nine times. In 1980, at the age of 75, she was arrested as well, and first was taken to a mental hospital, and then, when no mental illness was diagnosed, was tried and in January 1981 sentenced for five years exile for anti-Soviet propaganda and agitation, a standard criminal offense for dissidents at the time. Meshko was exiled to Ayan. She returned to Kyiv in 1985. In the last years of the Soviet Union, Meshko was allowed to travel abroad. She visited the United States and Australia, where she spoke in the Parliament. In 1989 she joined, and soon became one of the most active members, of the Ukrainian Helsinki society, later transformed to the Ukrainian Republican Party. She died on 2 January 1991.
