= Mykola Matusevych =

Ukrainian human rights activist and former Soviet dissident

- Микола Матусевич
- Born: 19 July 1947 (age 79); Matiushi, Kyiv Oblast, USSR (now Ukraine)
- Education: Kyiv State University (expelled)
- Organization: Ukrainian Helsinki Group
- Movement: Soviet dissidents
- Status: Pardoned 1988
- Criminal charges: Anti-Soviet agitation, hooliganism
- Penalty: 7 years' special regime, 5 years' internal exile

Mykola Ivanovych Matusevych (Ukrainian: Микола Іванович Матусевич; born 19 July 1947) is a Ukrainian human rights activist and former Soviet dissident who was a founding member of the Ukrainian Helsinki Group. For his human rights activities, he was sentenced to seven years of corrective labour and five years of internal exile in 1978, and listed as a prisoner of conscience by Amnesty International.

== Early life and career ==
Mykola Ivanovych Matusevych was born on 19 July 1947 in the village of Matiushi, in Ukraine's central Kyiv Oblast, to an agronomist father and a biology teacher mother. From an early age, he expressed interest in dissident activities; he was expelled from Kyiv State University in his fourth year of study for laying flowers at the monument to Taras Shevchenko in Kyiv and supporting arrested dissidents, though the official reason for his expulsion was due to a "lack of progress". Following his expulsion, Matusevych worked as a historian and editor of medical literature journals.

Following the signing of the Helsinki Accords, human rights activists in the Soviet Union sought to capitalise on the (non-binding) agreement's provisions guaranteeing upholding human rights. After the formation of the Moscow Helsinki Group on 12 May 1976, Matusevych, along with nine others, co-founded the Ukrainian Helsinki Group on 9 November 1976, and Matusevych wrote most of the group's early documents and appeals. The group's founding was followed by a series of attacks and persecutions by the Soviet authorities, beginning with the arrests and trial of Mykola Rudenko and Oleksa Tykhy in February 1977. This was followed by the detention of Oles Berdnyk in mid-April 1977, but he was released after questioning.

== Arrest ==
After Berdnyk's arrest, Matusevych, along with Myroslav Marynovych, was arrested on 23 April 1977 and charged with anti-Soviet agitation and hooliganism. The charges were based on a March 1977 event in which Marynovych and Matusevych had disrupted a ceremony at the Kyiv Philharmonic calling on those present to recite Shevchenko's Testament poem. Following the arrests, the homes of all members of the Ukrainian Helsinki Group were searched by Soviet authorities. According to The Ukrainian Weekly, Matusevych was also arrested for 15 days for caroling.

On 29 March 1978, following a trial which lasted several days, Matusevych and Marynovych were found guilty of anti-Soviet agitation and sentenced to the maximum penalty allowed under the criminal code: 7 years' imprisonment and 5 years' exile. Their sentences matched those of Rudenko and Tykhy the previous year. In response to the arrests and convictions, Matusevych and Marynovych, along with all other members of "Helsinki monitor" groups, were adopted as prisoners of conscience by human rights organisation Amnesty International.

Matusevych served out his prison sentence at VS-389/35 near Chusovoy, Perm Oblast, in the Russian SFSR. Despite his arrest, Matusevych continued to be active in human rights activism, and co-authored (with Yuri Orlov, Valeriy Marchenko, and Zynoviy Antoniuk) a report to Amnesty International detailing the poor conditions of Soviet prisons. In 1980, he was transferred to Chistopol prison for a further three years' imprisonment, and his wife, Olha Heiko Matusevych, was also arrested and sentenced to three years' imprisonment.

On 1988, Soviet leader Mikhail Gorbachev pardoned Matusevych from his internal exile as part of a broader campaign of reform. At first, Matusevych refused to leave exile, insisting on a full rehabilitation to clear his name. However, after a year, he returned to Ukraine.

== Since 1989 ==
Since 1989, Matusevych has lived in the city of Vasylkiv and worked as a builder, occasionally making statements on human rights and politics. In 2021, he gave an interview to the Local History publication, providing further information about his time as a human rights activist. In 2023, he also was one of several signatories to an open letter urging for Jews and Ukrainians to unite against Russia after controversy erupted over a monument to soldiers of the 14th Waffen Grenadier Division of the SS in Philadelphia.
