= Mykola Horbal =

Ukrainian poet, politician, and human rights activist

- Микола Горбаль
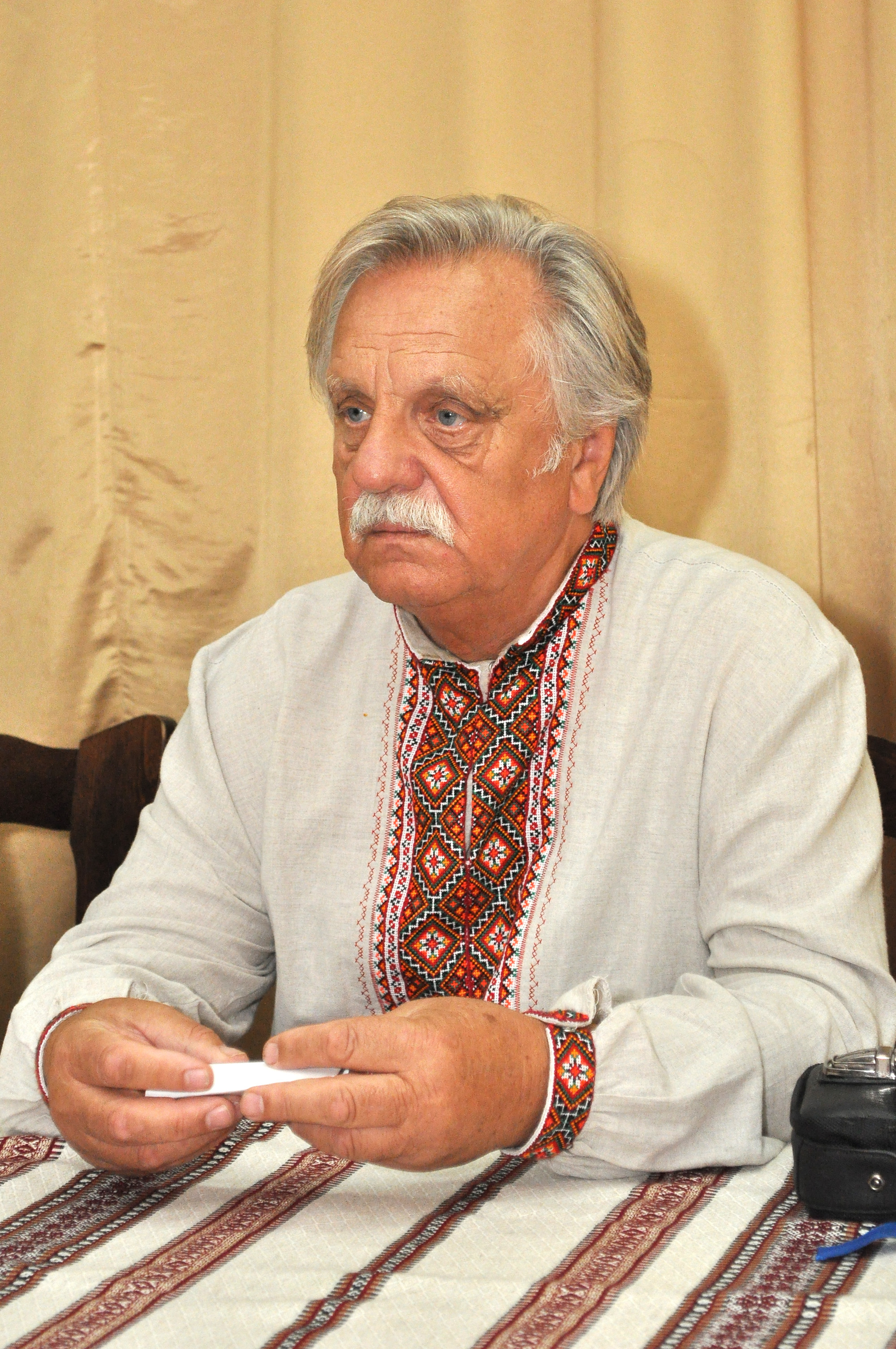
- Horbal in 2015

People's Deputy of Ukraine
- In office 11 May 1994 – 12 May 1998
- Preceded by: Kateryna Zadavska
- Succeeded by: Constituency abolished
- Constituency: Ternopil Oblast, No. 359

Personal details
- Born: 10 September 1940 (age 86) Wołowiec, Poland
- Party: Independent
- Education: Vasyl Stefanyk Precarpathian National University
- Known for: human rights activism with participation in the Ukrainian Helsinki Group
- Awards: Member of the Order of Liberty

Mykola Andriyovych Horbal (Ukrainian: Мико́ла Андрі́йович Го́рбаль; born 10 September 1940) is a Ukrainian former Soviet dissident, human right activist, politician, and poet who was a member of the Ukrainian Helsinki Group and later a People's Deputy of Ukraine.

== Early life ==
Mykola Horbal was born on 10 September 1940, in the village of Wołowiec in the Lemkivshchyna region, then administered as part of the General Government (German-occupied Poland), now in Gorlice County, Poland. In 1947, his family was moved to Ukraine, and they settled in the village of Letyache (Ternopil Oblast).

From 1963 to 1970, Horbal worked as a music teacher. During this period, he first started creating poetry.

== Imprisonment ==
On 24 November 1970, Horbal was arrested by the KGB and charged with Anti Soviet Agitation and Propaganda. He was sentenced to 5 years imprisonment and 2 years exile in Siberia.

On release from prison and return to Ukraine, Horbal settled in Kyiv, where he joined the Ukrainian Helsinki Group which had formed in 1976. All of the members of the group were arrested, and on October 23, 1979, Horbal was arrested and sentenced to 5 years hard labour.

In 1984, having completed the 5-year term, Horbal was not released from incarceration, but was immediately sentenced to another term of 8 years of hard labour and 3 years in exile. However, this sentence was terminated in 1988 during Perestroika.

== Political career ==
Upon release, Horbal immediately became active in Ukrainian politics. He served as a representative to the Kyiv City Council from 1990 to 1994.

Horbal has served as a People's Deputy of Ukraine from 1994 until 1998. In the 1994 Ukrainian parliamentary election he was elected as an independent candidate. He tried to regain his seat in the 1998 Ukrainian parliamentary election as a candidate of the Republican Christian Party, but failed to do so. The Republican Christian Party itself gained 0.54% of the total vote and no seats.

== Publications ==
Horbal's works were first published outside of Ukraine. The first collection of his work was published in the United States in 1983. His first collection was entitled "Details of a Noisy Alarmclock" (Ukrainian: Деталі Піщаного Годинника, romanized: Detali Pishchanoho Hodynnyka), and the second publication was of poetry for children, a collection entitled "A Song for Little Andrew" (Ukrainian: Коломийка Для Андрійка, romanized: Kolomyika Dlia Andriyka).

In 1986, a collection of his poetry was translated into German, and published in the collection "Here the End is Awaited" (Ukrainian: Тут Чекають Кінця, romanized: Tut Chekayut Kintsia).

In 1992, Horbal was awarded the prestigious Vasyl Stus Prize for poetry.

== State awards ==
- Member of the Order of Liberty (2009)
- Order for Courage 1st class (November 8, 2006).
- Order of Merit 3rd class (November 25, 2005).
