= Vasylkivka =

Rural locality in Dnipropetrovsk Oblast, Ukraine

Vasylkivka Васильківка
- Rural settlement
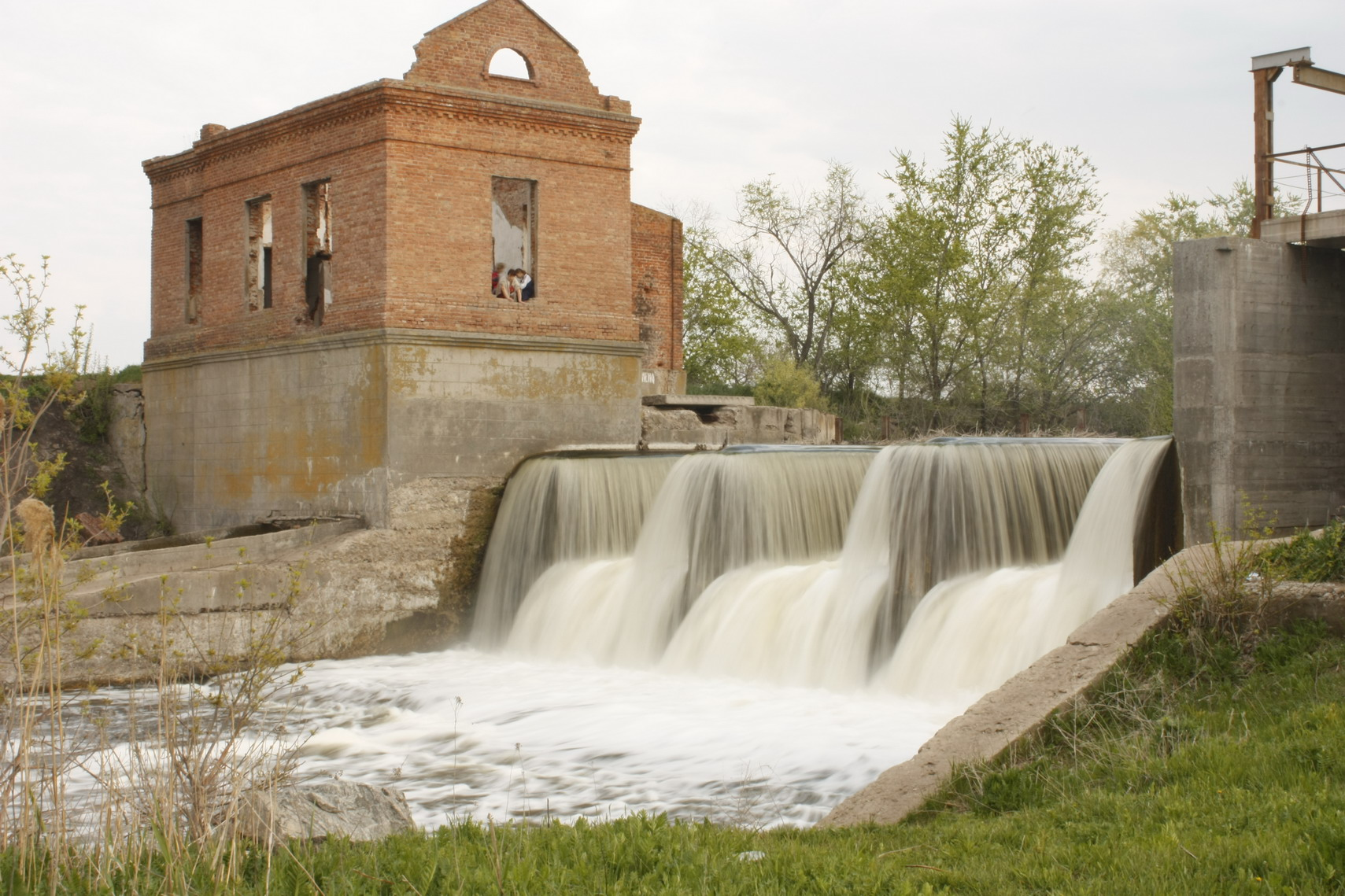

- Coat of arms
- Interactive map of Vasylkivka
- Location within Dnipropetrovsk Oblast Location within Ukraine
- Coordinates: 48°12′30″N 36°01′46″E
- Country: Ukraine
- Oblast: Dnipropetrovsk Oblast
- Raion: Synelnykove Raion

Population (2022)
  - Total: 11,242
- Time zone: UTC+2 (EET)
  - Summer (DST): UTC+3 (EEST)

Vasylkivka (Ukrainian: Васильківка; Russian: Васильковка) is a rural settlement in Synelnykove Raion, Dnipropetrovsk Oblast, Ukraine. It hosts the administration of Vasylkivka settlement hromada, one of the hromadas of Ukraine. Population: 11,184 (2024 estimate), 11,242 (2022 estimate).

Vasylkivka is located on the banks of the Vovcha River, a left tributary of the Samara, itself a left tributary of the Dnieper.

== History ==
Until 18 July 2020, Vasylkivka was the administrative center of Vasylkivka Raion. The raion was abolished in July 2020 as part of the administrative reform of Ukraine, which reduced the number of raions of Dnipropetrovsk Oblast to seven. The area of Vasylkivka Raion was merged into Synelnykove Raion.

Until 26 January 2024, Vasylkivka was designated urban-type settlement. On this day, a new law entered into force which abolished this status, and Vasylkivka became a rural settlement.

== Economy ==
=== Transportation ===
Vasylkivka is connected by road with Pavlohrad, where it has access to the Highway M04 connecting Dnipro with Pokrovsk, and with Pokrovske, where the Highway H15 continues to Zaporizhia.

Ulianovka railway station is located in Vasylkivka, on the railway line connecting Dnipro with Pokrovske, and with further connections to Pokrovsk, Zaporizhia, and Berdiansk.
