= Wołowiec, Lesser Poland Voivodeship =

Wołowiec
- Village
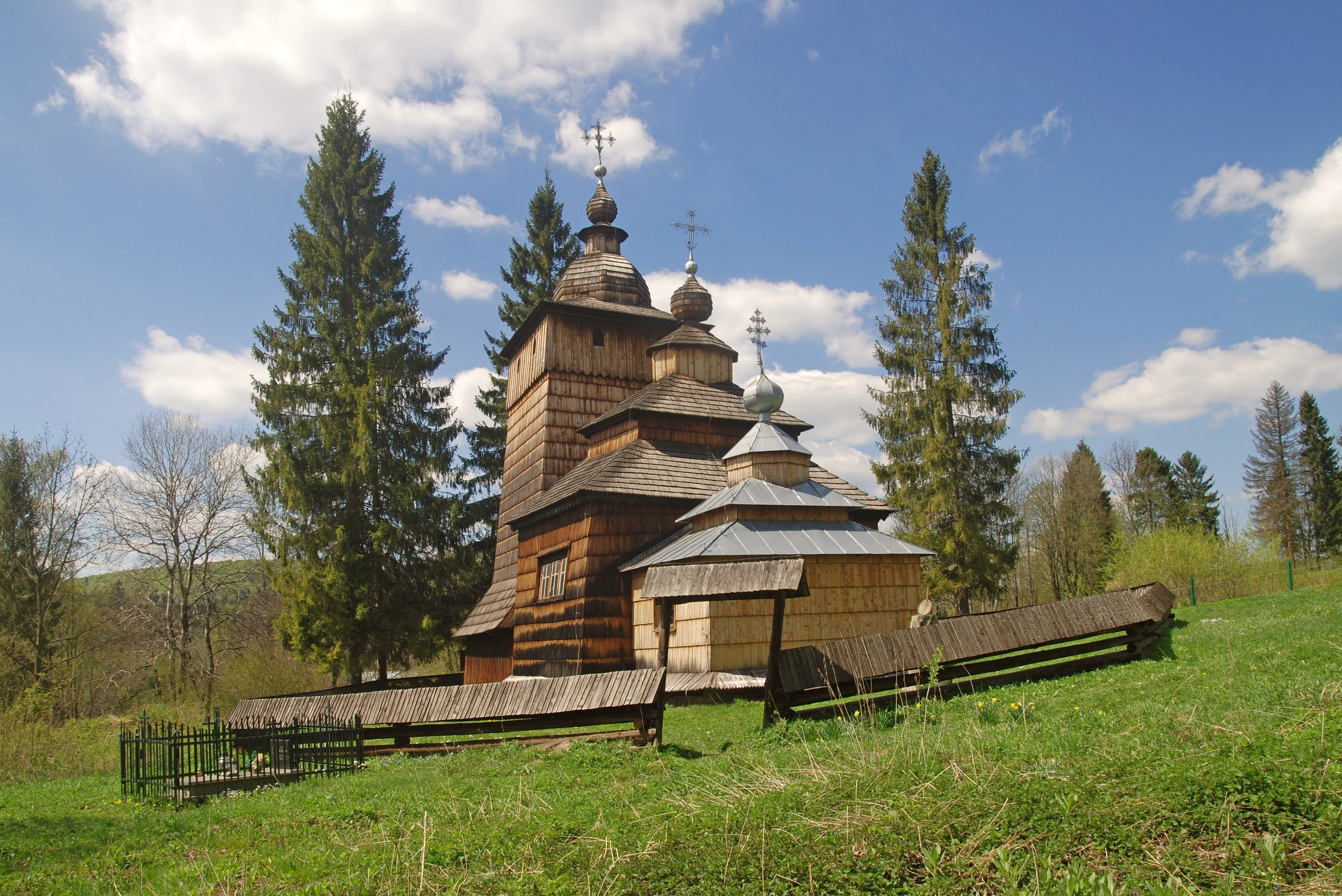
- Orthodox church

- Location within Poland
- Coordinates: 49°32′N 21°22′E
- Country: Poland
- Voivodeship: Lesser Poland
- County: Gorlice
- Gmina: Sękowa

Population
  - Total: 30

Wołowiec [vɔˈwɔvʲɛt͡s] is a village in the administrative district of Gmina Sękowa, within Gorlice County, Lesser Poland Voivodeship, in southern Poland, close to the border with Slovakia.
