= Oleksii Tykhy =

Ukrainian linguist, writer, and human rights activist (1927–1984)

Oleksa Tykhy
- Олекса Тихий
- Born: Oleksii Ivanovych Tykhy; 27 January 1927; Izhevka, Ukrainian SSR, Soviet Union (now Ukraine)
- Died: 6 May 1984 (aged 57); Perm-36, Perm Oblast, Russian SFSR, Soviet Union (now Perm Krai, Russia)
- Education: Moscow State University
- Movement: Ukrainian Helsinki Group, Soviet dissidents
- Convictions: Anti-Soviet agitation, slandering the communist party and Soviet reality (Note: Alternatively described as "counter-revolutionary activity" or "Ukrainian nationalism") (1957); Anti-Soviet agitation, illegal possession of firearms (1977)
- Penalty: 7 years corrective labour, 5 years deprivation of civil rights or exile (1957); 10 years corrective labour, 5 years exile (1977)

Oleksii Ivanovych Tykhy (Note: Also transliterated as Tykhyi) (Ukrainian: Олексі́й Іва́нович Ти́хий; 27 January 1927 – 6 May 1984) was a Ukrainian linguist, writer, and human rights activist who was one of the founders of the Ukrainian Helsinki Group. An activist from early in life, Tykhy was arrested twice on charges of anti-Soviet agitation for his activism against the Soviet invasion of Hungary and the Russification of Ukraine, and spent 17 years imprisoned before his death from stomach cancer in 1984. Since his death, he has been celebrated by other Ukrainian dissidents, such as Levko Lukianenko and Nadiya Svitlychna, for his efforts to preserve Ukraine's nationhood and strengthen human rights in the Ukrainian Soviet Socialist Republic.

== Early life and career ==
Oleksii Ivanovych Tykhy was born on 27 January 1927 in the village of Izhevka, in the eastern Donetsk Oblast of the Ukrainian Soviet Socialist Republic. Possessing strong academic abilities, he attended the faculty of philosophy at Moscow State University after having previously studied at Zaporizhye Agricultural Institute and the Dnipropetrovsk Institute for Transport Engineers. His first job was as a teacher of physics, mathematics, and the Ukrainian language in Pryazovske Raion, and he also worked as a fireman and in construction.

From this period, Tykhy was a strong critic of the Soviet government, being arrested for his opposition to the Soviet electoral system in 1948. However, he was soon released, and he began working as head of studies at the secondary school in Oleksiievo-Druzhkivka. He strongly criticised the Komsomol and Soviet youth, arguing that the latter needed to strive for greater independence from their elders.

== 1957 arrest ==
Following the Hungarian Revolution of 1956 and the subsequent Soviet invasion, Tykhy publicly criticised the Soviet government's handling of the events, and sent a letter to the Central Committee of the Communist Party of the Soviet Union arguing that "it's no longer possible to build communism in the Soviet Union" after the invasion. In response to this, the Soviet government arrested Tykhy in February 1957 and charged him with anti-Soviet agitation, as well as "slandering the Communist Party and Soviet reality". According to other sources, such as the Encyclopedia of Ukraine, he was instead charged with Ukrainian nationalism, and Amnesty International further claimed he had been accused of "counter-revolutionary behaviour". Further information leading to Tykhy's arrest was taken from a conference on reforms to the Soviet education system, where Tykhy strongly criticised the state of schools.

The ultimate verdict of Tykhy's trial was seven years of corrective labour, as well as five years of internal exile or deprivation of civil rights. The verdict was delivered on 18 May 1958 by the Stalino Regional Court (now Donetsk Regional Court), citing Article 54-10 of the Criminal Code of the Ukrainian Soviet Socialist Republic. He was first sent to Vladimir Central Prison, and later to Dubravlag in Mordovia.

== Career between arrests ==
Following his release, Tykhy struggled to find employment, as he was barred from teaching. He worked at local libraries, as a pipefitter, fireman, and brick firer, and began publishing Ukrainian samizdat. This was followed soon by writing and publication of his own samizdat, arguing against the Russification of the Donbas region. He was also a supporter of agrarianism, bemoaning the decline of Ukrainian rural life. He further expressed support for collective farming, but called for greater freedoms for farmers. Among other samizdat activities by Tykhy were a 1973 letter to the Supreme Soviet of the Ukrainian Soviet Socialist Republic and a dictionary of the Donbas dialect of Ukrainian.

== 1977 arrest and death ==
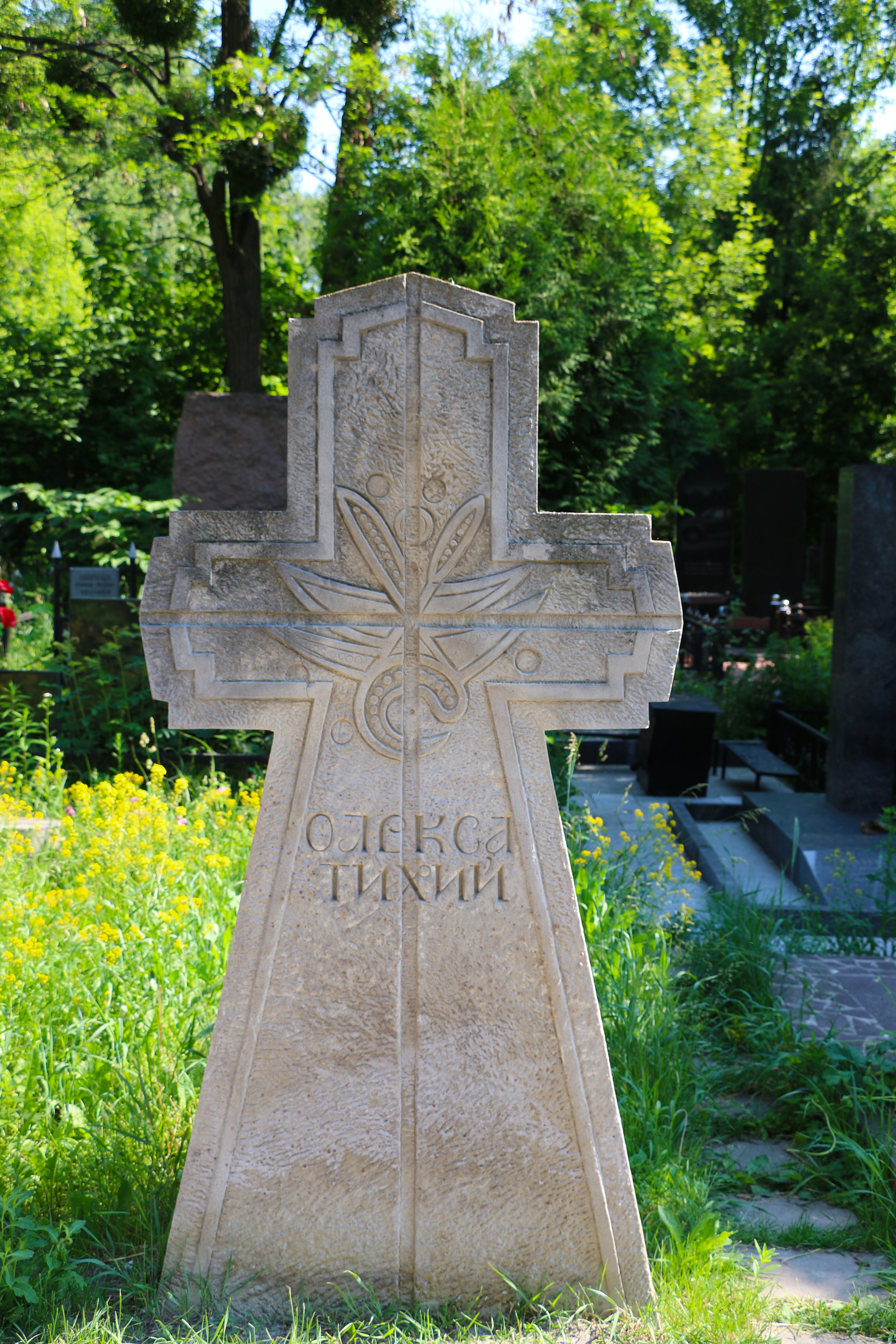
Oleksa Tykhyi's grave on Baikove Cemetery

In February 1976, Tykhy became a founding member of the Ukrainian Helsinki Group. Following this, Soviet authorities began to actively target and arrest the group's members, including Tykhy. On 4 February 1977, Tykhy was arrested by the Soviet police, and charged under anti-Soviet agitation and illegal possession of firearms. The latter charge came from a World War II-era German rifle Tykhy had sealed with clay and stored in his shed's attic. He was placed on trial, along with fellow dissident Mykola Rudenko, on 23 June 1977 in Druzhkivka. Several of Tykhy's texts were considered at the trial, but he was ultimately convicted on a statement referring to "supposed Russification in the Donbas area". The Donetsk Regional Court sentenced him to ten years of corrective labour and five years of internal exile, based on his previous conviction, and he was sent to Mordovia to undertake his sentence.

Tykhy's second arrest was subject to international condemnation; the United States Congress issued a resolution urging his release, along with the releases of Valentyn Moroz, Rudenko, and Yurii Shukhevych, on 16 May 1977. Amnesty International also listed him as a prisoner of conscience, a status he would maintain until his death.

Like many other prison labourers in Mordovia, Tykhy began to suffer from digestive problems following his arrival - in particular, he was stricken with a stomach ulcer. Despite this, however, he launched a 52-day hunger strike in protest of the conditions faced by political prisoners. In Mordovia, Tykhy also collaborated with other imprisoned dissidents, such as Vasyl Romaniuk, with whom he wrote a tract calling for nonviolent resistance to Soviet rule. He also frequently spoke with fellow Helsinki Group leader Vasyl Ovsienko, who shared a cell with him and noted his maintained interest in education.

Following an October 1978 hunger strike, Tykhy launched a third hunger strike on 1 April 1979, eventually being hospitalised after 17 days for a stomach hernia and peritonitis. Prior to his hospitalisation, he refused requests to be granted treatment in return for recanting his political views. Ovsienko later claimed that Tykhy's stomach was sewn in a fashion as to make digestion more difficult and painful, and the Kharkiv Human Rights Protection Group alleged that a doctor said to him, "Your life will be short and full of pain." Following the operation, the hospital recommended Tykhy's release on the grounds of ill health, but the Soviet government refused.

Following the operation, Tykhy's health continued to decline, and punishments by prison authorities became more severe. He was placed into solitary confinement through January and February 1980, having been accused of ripping off his breast tag, refusing to stand in recognition of prison authorities or work, and posing a negative influence to other prisoners. During his time in solitary confinement, he weighed no more than 40 kilograms (88 lb) and was exposed to unsanitary conditions.

From 27 February to 1 March 1980, Tykhy and other political prisoners imprisoned at the same prison were moved to the Perm-36 labour colony. There, Tykhy was further punished for refusing to shave and work, as well as for hunger strikes, and he was placed in solitary confinement for a further six months. Author and political prisoner Vasyl Stus later wrote that Tykhy "look[ed] as if he [had] just been lifted from the cross." Tykhy's health increasingly worsened, particularly from 1983, and Amnesty International began to advocate publicly for Tykhy's release.

Tykhy died on 5 or 6 May 1984, at the age of 57, from stomach cancer. According to Amnesty International, at the time of his death Tykhy was suffering from angina, arteriosclerosis, anemia, and back pains. After his death, Tykhy's body was not handed over to his son. In 1989, along with Stus and dissident Yuriy Lytvyn, was reburied in Baikove Cemetery in Kyiv, in a ceremony involving 30,000 people.
