= Ukrainian Helsinki Group =

Ukrainian human rights organisation

Ukrainian Helsinki Group Українська Гельсінська Група
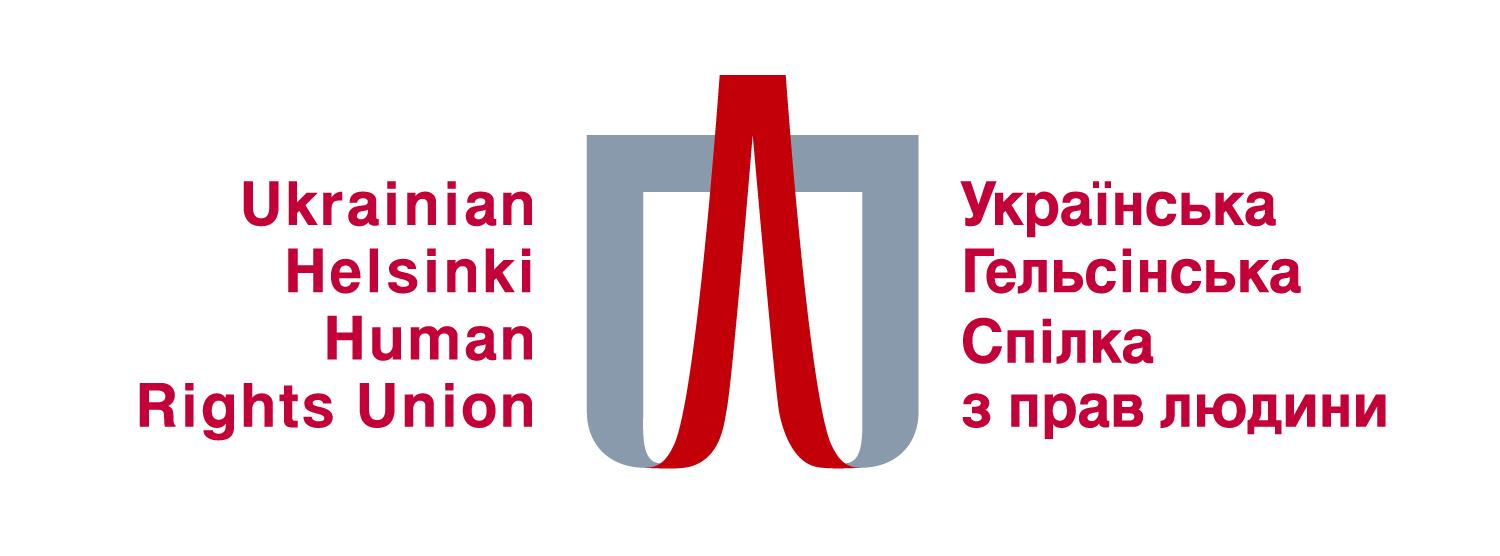
- Formation: 9 November 1976; 50 years ago
- Founder: Mykola Rudenko and others
- Type: Non-profit NGO
- Headquarters: Kyiv, Ukraine
- Fields: human rights monitoring
- Publication: A Chronicle of Current Events
- Parent organization: Helsinki Committee for Human Rights
- Website: helsinki.org.ua

The Ukrainian Helsinki Group (Ukrainian: Українська Гельсінська Група, romanized: Ukrainska Helsinska Hrupa) was founded on November 9, 1976, as the Ukrainian Public Group to Promote the Implementation of the Helsinki Accords on Human Rights (Ukrainian: Українська громадська група сприяння виконанню гельсінських угод, romanized: Ukrainska hromadska hrupa spryiannia vykonanniu helsinskykh uhod) to monitor human rights in Ukraine. The group was active until 1981 when all members were jailed.

The group's goal was to monitor the Soviet Government's compliance with the Helsinki Accords, which ensure human rights. The members of the group based the group's legal viability on the provision in the Helsinki Final Act, Principle VII, which established the rights of individuals to know and act upon their rights and duties.

== Details ==
In 1977, the Ukrainian Helsinki Group's foreign affiliate began operating with the participation of Petro Hryhorenko, Nadiya Svitlychna, and Leonid Plyushch. Later, Nina Strokata Karavanska and Nadiya Svitlichna began to host the human rights themed radio programs on Svoboda radio.

From the very early days, the group endured the repressions of Soviet authorities. In February 1977 the authorities began to arrest members of the Ukrainian Helsinki Group, and within two years all the founding members were tried and sentenced to exile or imprisonment for 7 to 10 years.

At the end of 1979, six members of the group were forced to emigrate, while other Ukrainian dissidents were not allowed to do so. Soviet authorities used punitive medicine: some Ukrainian Helsinki Group members (Oksana Meshko, Vasyl Stus, Petro Sichko and his son Vasyl) were threatened with committal to a psychiatric unit. Hanna Mykhailenko, who was a sympathizer of the Group, was detained in a psychiatric hospital in 1980. Bad conditions in Soviet camps and prisons caused the deaths of UHG members Oleksiy Tykhy and Vasyl Stus later on.

In 1982, the 'Initiative Group for the Defense of Believers and the Church' was established, which considered itself a part of the Helsinki movement in Ukraine. Its organizers, Yosyp Terelia and Vasyl Kobryn, were both sentenced in 1985.

Some political prisoners from outside of Ukraine (Mart Niklus, an Estonian, and Viktoras Petkus, a Lithuanian) announced their symbolic membership in the Group in 1983.

By 1983, the Ukrainian Helsinki Group had 37 members, of whom 22 were in prison camps, 5 were in exile, 6 emigrated to the West, 3 were released and were living in Ukraine, 1 (Mykhailo Melnyk) committed suicide.

On July 7, 1988, members of the group established and officially registered the Ukrainian Helsinki Association which in 1990 transformed itself into the Ukrainian Republican Party. In 2004, the Ukrainian Helsinki Human Rights Union was established as an association of public human rights organizations.

== Members ==
According to estimates by Vasyl Ovsiienko, the group involved 41 people in total. About 27 of them were sentenced by Soviet authorities to prisons and camps directly for their membership in the association. They spent altogether about 170 years in prisons, mental hospitals and in exile.

=== UHG abroad ===
- Petro Grigorenko
- Leonid Plyushch
- Nina Strokata

In 1980, for UHG abroad, Nadiya Svitlychna became an editor of the "Herald of Repressions in Ukraine" publication.

=== Arrested members ===
By 1982, most members of the Ukrainian Helsinki Group had been arrested:

Name	Sentenced on	Sentence
Mykola Rudenko	1 July 1977	Seven years in strict regimen camp and five years of internal exile for "anti-Soviet agitation and propaganda";
Oleksa Tykhy	1 July 1977	Ten years in special regimen camp and five years of internal exile for "anti-Soviet agitation and propaganda" and illegal possession of firearms (Article 222, Ukrainian Code);
Myroslav Marynovych	29 March 1978	Seven years in strict regimen camp and five years of internal exile for "anti-Soviet agitation and propaganda";
Mykola Matusevych	29 March 1978	Seven years in strict regimen camp and five years of internal exile for "anti-Soviet agitation and propaganda";
Levko Lukianenko	20 July 1978	Ten years in special regimen camp and five years of internal exile for "anti-Soviet agitation and propaganda";
Vasyl Ovsienko	7 February 1979	3 years + 10 years; prisoned until 12 August 1988;
Oles Berdnyk	24 December 1979	Six years in strict regimen camp and three years of internal exile for "anti-Soviet agitation and propaganda";
Mykola Horbal	21 January 1980	Five years of camp for "resisting a representative of authority" and attempted rape (Article 117, Ukrainian Code);
Zenovii Krasivskyi		Arrested on 12 March 1980, and transferred directly into labor camp to serve the eight months in camp and five years of internal exile remaining under a 1967 sentence for "anti-Soviet agitation and propaganda" and "treason";
Vitaliy Kalynychenko	18 May 1980	Ten years in special regimen camp and five years of internal exile for "anti-Soviet agitation and propaganda";
Viacheslav Chornovil	6 June 1980	Five years in strict regimen camp for attempted rape (Arrested before completion of previous term of six years camp and three years exile);
Olha Heyko	26 August 1980	Three years general regimen camp for "anti-Soviet slander" (Article 187, Ukrainian Code);
Vasyl Stus	14 October 1980	Ten years in special regimen camp and 5 years of internal exile for "anti-Soviet agitation and propaganda" (Article 62, Ukrainian Code);
Oksana Meshko	6 January 1981	Six months in strict regimen camp and five years of internal exile for "anti-Soviet agitation and propaganda";
Ivan Sokulskyi	13 January 1981	Five years in prison, five years in camp, plus five years of exile for "anti-Soviet agitation and propaganda";
Ivan Kandyba	24 July 1981	10 years special regimen camp plus five years exile for "anti-Soviet agitation and propaganda";
Petro Rozumnyi		Conditionally released from camp early in Fall 1981, but was working on a compulsory labor brigade;
Vasyl Striltsiv	October 1981	Six years in camp on unknown charges (In 1979, he was given a two-year term for "violation of internal passport laws");
Yaroslav Lesiv	15 November 1981	Five years of strict regimen camp for "possession of narcotics" (In 1980, he got a two-year term for "possession of narcotics");
Vasyl Sichko	4 January 1982	Three years strict regimen camp for "possession of narcotics" (In 1979, he got a three-year term for "anti-Soviet slander");
Yuriy Lytvyn	April 1982	Ten years of special regimen camp plus five years of exile for "anti-Soviet agitation and propaganda" (In 1979, he got three year-term for "resisting a representative of authority");
Petro Sichko	June 1982	three years in strict regimen camp for "anti-Soviet slander" (In 1979, he got three-year term for "anti-Soviet slander")

=== In Mordovia prisons ===
- Levko Lukyanenko
- Mykola Rudenko
- Oleksa Tykhy
- Svyatoslav Karavansky
- Volodymyr Romanyuk
- Iryna Senyk
- Danylo Shumuk
- Yuriy Shukhevych
- Oksana Popovych

== See also ==
- Moscow Helsinki Group
- Ukrainian Christian Democratic Party
- Human rights movement in the Soviet Union
- List of members, known members
