= Yaroslav Lesiv =

Ukrainian poet, Greek Catholic priest, and human rights activist

Lesiv in 1990

Yaroslav Vasylyovych Lesiv (Ukrainian: Яросла́в Васи́льович Ле́сів, 3 January 1945, Luzhkiv, Dolyna Raion – 10 October 1991, Bolekhiv) was a Ukrainian poet, priest, and member of the Ukrainian Helsinki Group.

Yaroslav Lesiv was born in the village of Luzhkiv, (Ukrainian Лужків), in Dolyna Raion, Ivano-Frankivsk Oblast of Western Ukraine. He became a teacher of physical education at a secondary school.

In 1965, he joined the Ukrainian National Front, an underground organization working for Ukrainian independence from the Soviet Union. On 29 March 1965, his membership in this organization was discovered. He and other members of the UNF were put on trial in 1967 and convicted of Treason (Article 56 = 64 RSFSR) and of organising an underground organisation (Article 64 = 72 RSFSR).

Lesiv and the other four ringleaders were sentenced to 6 years in a corrective-labour camp. He was sent to Camp 19 for political prisoners in Mordovia (Dubrovlag) but transferred three years later to Vladimir Prison to be kept under a punishment regime. There in December 1970 he took part in a mass hunger strike with other political prisoners.

Lesiv was released in 1973.

Early on 3 October 1977 Lesiv joined the Ukrainian Helsinki Group. Two years later he was arrested and accused of being in possession of drugs. On 6 February 1980, he was sentenced to two years' imprisonment and sent to a corrective-labour colony in Ukraine.

Just before his release was due, Lesiv was again sentenced for possession of drugs and this time given a further five years' imprisonment. He was then serving his sentence in a camp near Lvov and working as a loader.

== Religious life ==
Yaroslav Lesiv was active in the Ukrainian Catholic Church. From the late 1980s, Lesiv was working towards the restoration of the Ukrainian Catholic church.

In 1988, Lesiv was ordained as a priest in the Ukrainian Catholic Rite.

In 1989, Lesiv visited Moscow twice - including a hunger strike protesting the illegal status of the Ukrainian Catholic Church.

On the night of 9-10 October 1991, Yaroslav Lesiv was killed in an automobile accident. He is buried in Bolekhiv, Ukraine.
