= Mykola Rudenko =

Ukrainian writer, philosopher, and human rights activist

Hero of Ukraine Mykola Rudenko
- Микола Руденко
- Born: 19 December 1920; Yurivka, Ukrainian SSR
- Died: 1 April 2004 (aged 83); Kyiv, Ukraine
- Citizenship: Ukrainian SSR (1920–1922) → Soviet Union (1922–1988) → stateless (1988–1990) → Soviet Union (1990–1991) → Ukraine (1991–2004)
- Education: Kyiv State University
- Occupations: political instructor of company during the Second World War, writer, novelist, poet, radio personality
- Employer(s): Writer's Union of Ukraine, Radio Liberty, Voice of America
- Known for: human rights activism with participation in the Ukrainian Helsinki Group
- Political party: Communist Party of the Soviet Union
- Movement: dissident movement in the Soviet Union
- Spouse(s): Olena Shapovalova, Raisa Rudenko
- Children: sons: Yuriy, Oleh, Valeriy; daughter: Alyona
- Parent(s): Danylo and Dokiya
- Military career
- Allegiance: Soviet Union
- Branch: Red Army / Soviet Army
- Service years: 1941–1945
- Unit: company
- Conflicts: Second World War
- Awards: USSR Ukraine Shevchenko National Prize

Mykola Danylovych Rudenko (Ukrainian: Микола Данилович Руденко; 19 December 1920 – 1 April 2004) was a Ukrainian poet, writer, philosopher, Soviet dissident, human rights activist and World War II veteran. He was the founder of the Ukrainian Helsinki Group, and was twice arrested for his dissident activities.

== Biography ==
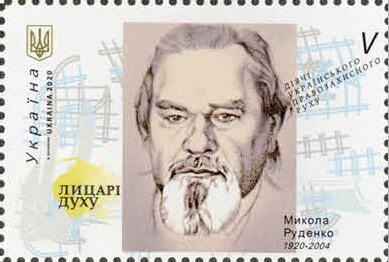
Ukrainian stamp of 2020 portraying Rudenko

Rudenko was seven years old when his father died in a mining accident. With his mother and two siblings, he worked on the family farm until they were forced to give their land during the process of collectivization. He was traumatized by the Holodomor, and remarked that it remained with him his entire life. He began to write as a child, and had some of his poems published by the local newspapers. His writing earned him a scholarship to Kyiv State University in 1939. He only studied for two months until he was called into the Red Army.

During the war Rudenko sustained serious injuries. On 4 October 1941 near Leningrad he was wounded by an exploding bullet, which shattered bones of the pelvis and entered his spine. He spent over a year in the hospital. However, he was able to walk again. He was awarded the Order of the Red Star, of the Great Patriotic War 1st class, and six other medals.

In 1946 Rudenko left the army, but did not return to university. He continued to write, and his first collection of poems was published in 1947

== Works ==
Upon publishing his first collection From the march in 1947, he was accepted into the Union of Writers of Ukraine. Rudenko was a member of the Communist party, and he worked a variety of jobs for various publishing companies. He wrote a wide variety of poetry and novels, some of his most famous being: The Last Sabre (1959), The Magic boomerang (1966), The Eagle's Ravine (1970), and the collection of poems about Holodomor The Cross in 1976.

He also wrote works of philosophy. In The Energy of Progress (1974) he argued against the works of Karl Marx, basing his opinion on the observations of Serhiy Podolynsky. In 1972 his works stopped being published in the Soviet Union.

== Dissident activity ==
Rudenko stopped his cooperation with the Party in the late 1940s. He was convinced that De-Stalinization was not the answer, and that real problem was the Soviet ideology, not Joseph Stalin. Rudenko began to petition all levels of the Party about the need for reform, even sending a letter to Nikita Khrushchev in 1960. He was put under surveillance by the KGB, and he began to meet more and more other members of the dissident movement. In 1974 he was expelled from the Communist Party of the Soviet Union for his views on Marxism. He lost his job and had to take a position as a night watchman. In the 1970s he began to get involved with human rights. This led to his arrest on 18 April 1975 for Anti-Soviet agitation and propaganda, but was released on amnesty as a World War II veteran. In 1976 he was forced to take a psychiatric exam. On 9 November 1976 he announced the formation of the Ukrainian Helsinki Group. The group began publishing information about violations of human rights in Ukraine, including details about Holodomor and other repressions and atrocities.

== Arrest ==
On 5 February 1977 he was once again arrested along with Oleksiy Tykhyi. His trial took place between 23 June and 1 July 1977, and he was sentenced to 7 years in a labor camp and 5 years exile for "anti-Soviet agitation and propaganda". In 1978, all of his 17 works were removed from circulation. Rudenko was first taken to a Mordovian prisoner camp, but then his wife was arrested and sent to the same camp. He was then transferred to a camp in the Perm region. As a disabled person, he was not forced to do work at first. But, he took part in prisoner strikes and was later forced to do labor despite his injuries from the German-Soviet War. On 5 March 1984 he was taken to the village of Mayma, in the present day Altai Republic, to serve his exile. Three years later, his wife Raisa Rudenko joined him, and they were released in 1987 due to public pressure. Their residence had been confiscated, so they left for Germany, and then the United States. He worked in the US for Radio Svoboda and Voice of America, while continuing work for the Ukrainian Helsinki Group. In 1988, he was stripped of his Soviet citizenship. He returned to Kyiv in September 1990, and his citizenship was reinstated and he was fully rehabilitated.

== Honors and awards ==
Rudenko received various honors for his work. In 1988, the Philadelphia Educational and Scientific Center named him "Ukrainian of the year" for defending the national rights of the Ukrainian people and their culture. In 1990 he was elected a member of the Ukrainian Free Academy of Sciences. In 1993 Rudenko was awarded the State Taras Shevchenko Prize for Literature. In 1998, his memoirs were published under the title "Найбільше диво - життя" (The Greatest Miracle is Life: Memoirs).

Soviet Union

Order of the Red Star
Order of the Patriotic War, 1st class

Ukraine

Hero of Ukraine
Order of Merit (Ukraine), 3rd class

== Sources ==
- Grigorenko, Petro; Nahaylo, Bohdan (January 1979). "My friend Mykola Rudenko". Index on Censorship. 8 (1): 33–40. doi:10.1080/03064227908532879.
- Lesya Verba, Bohdan Yasen. The Human Rights Movement in Ukraine. Smoloskyp Publishers (1980)
- Carynnyk, Marco. Ukraine and the Helsinki Accords: Soviet Violations of Human Rights, 1975-1980. World Congress of Free Ukrainians (1980)
- Monument of Dissident Movement (in Ukrainian)
- Biography (in Ukrainian)
- Subtelny, Orest. Ukraine: A History University of Toronto Press (2000)
- Swoboda Victor. The Evolution of Mykola Rudenko's Philosophy in His Poetry // Studia Ucrainica. – 1988. – No. 4. – P. 76–84.
