= Vasylkivka Raion =

Former subdivision of Dnipropetrovsk Oblast, Ukraine

Vasylkivka Raion Васильківський район
- Raion
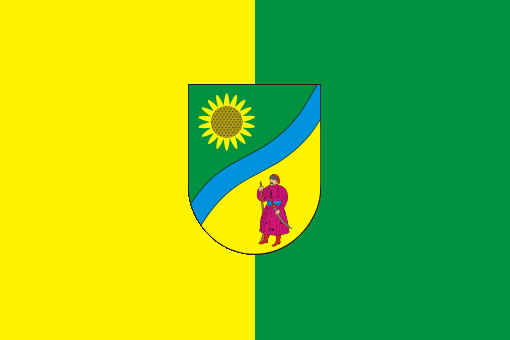
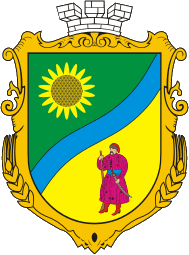
- Flag Coat of arms

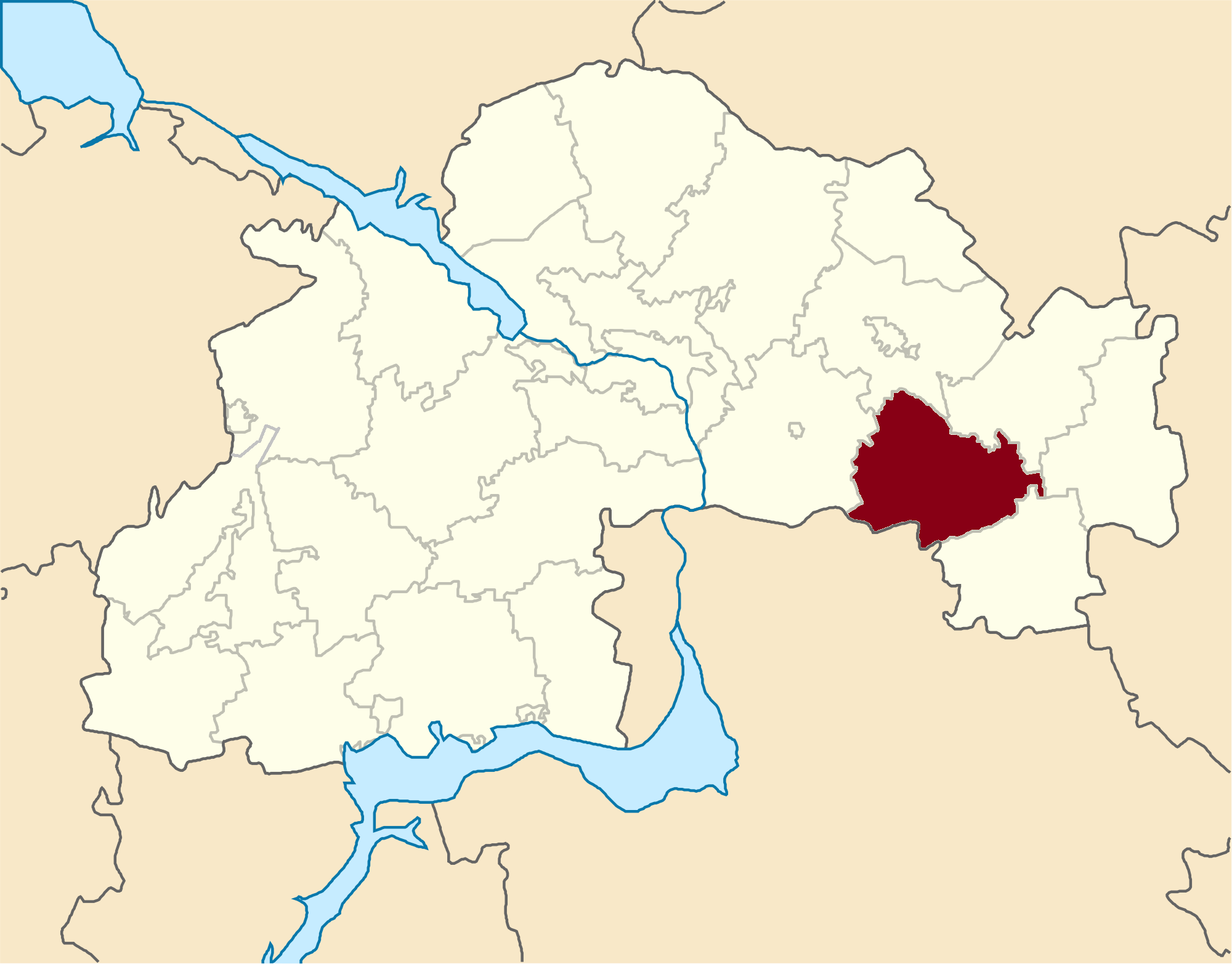
- Coordinates: 48°12′22.5″N 36°2′5″E
- Country: Ukraine
- Region: Dnipropetrovsk Oblast
- Disestablished: 18 July 2020
- Admin. center: Vasylkivka
- Subdivisions: List: — city councils; — settlement councils; — rural councils; Number of localities: — cities; — urban-type settlements; — villages; — rural settlements

Area
  - Total: 1,330 km^{2} (510 sq mi)

Population (2020)
  - Total: 31,093
  - Density: 23.4/km^{2} (60.5/sq mi)
- Time zone: UTC+02:00 (EET)
  - Summer (DST): UTC+03:00 (EEST)
- Area code: +380

Vasylkivka Raion (Ukrainian: Васильківський район) was a raion (district) of Dnipropetrovsk Oblast, southeastern-central Ukraine. Its administrative centre was located at the urban-type settlement of Vasylkivka. The raion was abolished on 18 July 2020 as part of the administrative reform of Ukraine, which reduced the number of raions of Dnipropetrovsk Oblast to seven. The area of Vasylkivka Raion was merged into Synelnykove Raion. The last estimate of the raion population was 31,093 (2020 est.).

In the 26 October 2014 Ukrainian parliamentary election Dmytro Yarosh as a Right Sector candidate won a parliament seat (the only one for Right Sector) by winning single-member districts number 39 ("Vasylkivka") located in Vasylkivka Raion and neighbouring raions with 29.76% of the votes.

At the time of disestablishment, the raion consisted of two hromadas:

- Mykolaivka rural hromada with the administration in the selo of Mykolaivka;
- Vasylkivka settlement hromada with the administration in Vasylkivka.

In August 2020, Mykolaivka rural hromada was renamed Dubovyky rural hromada, and its administration was moved to the selo of Dubovyky.
