= Ukrainian Helsinki Union =

Political party in Ukraine, Soviet Union

Ukrainian Helsinki Union Українська Гельсінська спілка
- Abbreviation: UHS
- Leader: Levko Lukianenko
- Founder: Viacheslav Chornovil; Bohdan Horyn; Mykhailo Horyn
- Founded: 7 July 1988
- Dissolved: 29 April 1990
- Merger of: Ukrainian Helsinki Group; Spadshchyna; Ukrainian Culturological Club
- Succeeded by: Ukrainian Republican Party
- Ideology: National Democracy; Confederalism
- National affiliation: People's Movement of Ukraine

The Ukrainian Helsinki Union (Ukrainian: Украї́нська Ге́льсінська спі́лка, romanized: Ukrainska Helsinska spilka, abbreviated UHS) was a political party active in the Ukrainian Soviet Socialist Republic from 1988 to 1990. Led by Viacheslav Chornovil and Levko Lukianenko, it was the first non-communist party to be legal in Ukraine following the establishment of the Ukrainian Soviet Socialist Republic, although it never referred to itself as such for legal reasons.

== History ==
The Ukrainian Helsinki Union was established on 7 July 1988 by Ukrainian Soviet dissident leaders Viacheslav Chornovil, Bohdan Horyn, and Mykhailo Horyn, amidst a meeting of 50,000 people in the west Ukrainian city of Lviv. The meeting followed a series of protests in Lviv and the capital of Kyiv honouring the second anniversary of the Chernobyl disaster which had been cracked down on by the Soviet Ukrainian government. Levko Lukianenko, a longtime dissident, was elected as the party's leader.

The UHS did not formally constitute itself as a party, as leaders feared doing so would provoke a reaction from the Soviet authorities. Despite this, they formulated a political programme, first articulated by Chornovil at the party's founding rally and later repeated at the opening of its Kyiv branch ten days later. The political programme called for Ukrainian independence, the establishment of a confederal union of states comprising the Soviet Union, restoration of autonomy to Crimea, the return of the Crimean Tatars and reducing the role of the Communist Party. Economically, the UHS sought the introduction of a market economy and financial benefits to the unemployed and impoverished, as well as granting peasants the right to withdraw from membership in collective farms and granting workers the right to establish independent trade unions. The policy of supporting a confederation was one done pragmatically, as Chornovil and the Horyn brothers felt that it would serve to better insulate them against the Soviet government. Despite this, the party came under surveillance from the KGB almost immediately after its founding.

Political differences proved problematic for the UHS almost immediately after its founding. A group of more radical activists (Hryhorii Prykhodko, Vasyl Sichko, Ivan Makar, and Vasyl Ruban) unsuccessfully attempted to remove the party's executive committee (comprising Chornovil, Mykola Horbal, Mykhailo Horyn, Stepan Khmara, Lukianenko, and Yevhen Proniuk) over the latter's willingness to promote a confederation and their unclear position on how to achieve independence. The former group publicly criticised Lukianenko and other members of the committee during a meeting of dissident organisations in Loodi, Estonia. In response, the executive committee called on regional branches to expel Sichko and Makar, which was later fulfilled. The UHS also maintained contacts with the Polish Solidarity trade union.

The UHS later joined the People's Movement of Ukraine following its establishment. At the party's constituent congress on 29 April 1990 Lukianenko announced his declaration into the Ukrainian Republican Party, which was the first non-Communist party to formally refer to itself as such.
