= Dubblestandart =

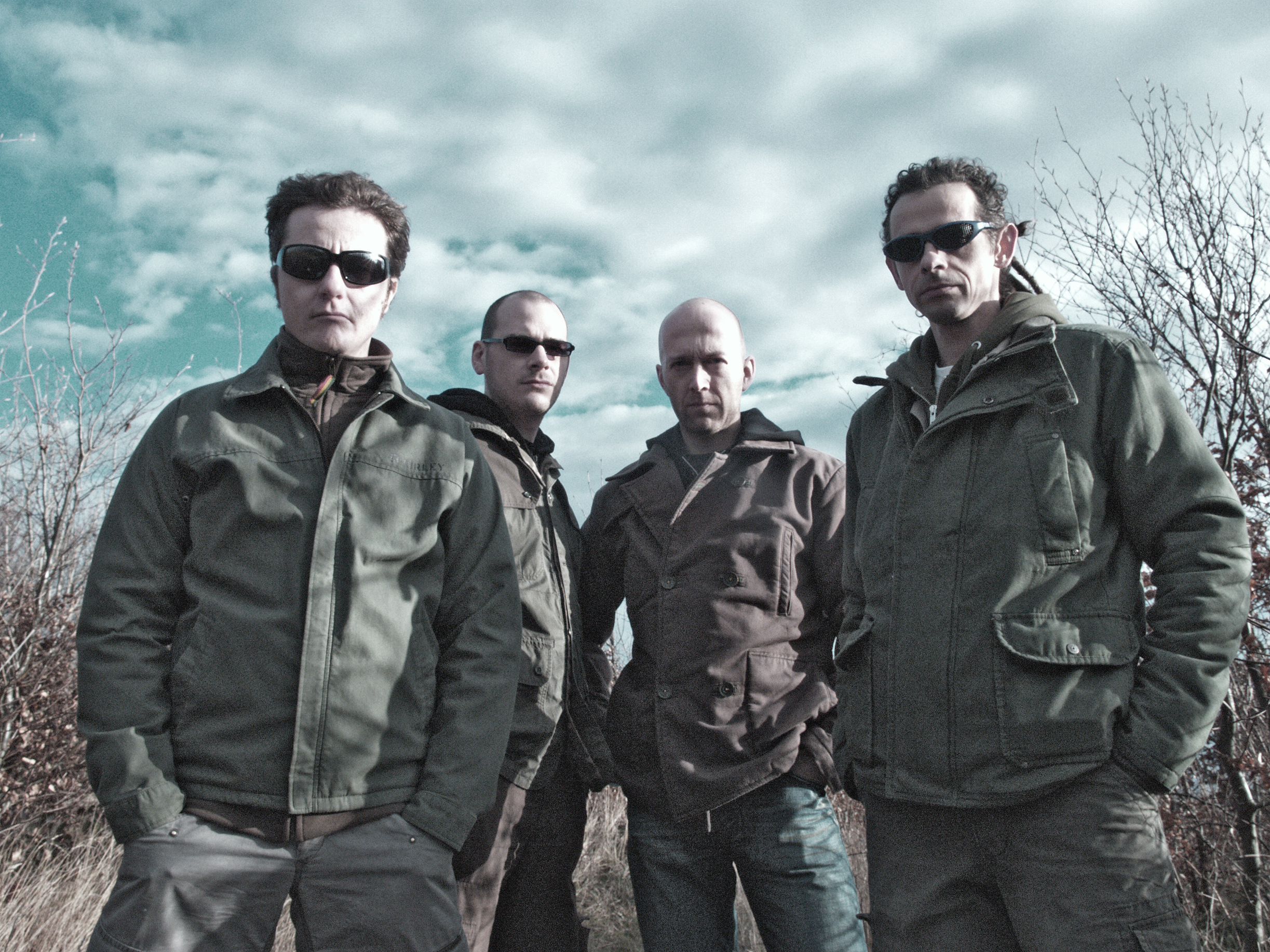

Background information
- Origin: Vienna, Austria-EC
- Genres: Reggae, dub, crossover, electronic, alternative
- Years active: 1987–present
- Label: Echo Beach
- Website: dubblestandart.com

Dubblestandart is a dub reggae band from Vienna, Austria. They were founded in 1987 and achieved breakthrough success in 1992. The band has collaborated with Lee "Scratch" Perry, Ari Up from the Slits, and film director David Lynch, on their studio album Return From Planet Dub in 2009. They describe their style as "hi-energy dub" or "21st century dub".

== History ==
The band was founded in 1987 by original members, Paul Zasky, Robbie Ost, Johnny Heilig and Operator Marek. Today's setup consists of two of the original members, Paul Zasky (bass guitar, vocals) and Robbie Ost (dub mix, studio production), with the addition from 1993 of Ali Tersch on drums, and from 2001 of Herbert Pirker on guitar. Tersch has drummed for Supermax, while Pirker also plays guitar with House of Riddim, a backing band for international reggae artists. Since 1989, Dubblestandart has performed live with their own program, and as a backing band in Europe, Canada, Russia, India and Switzerland.

The band was discovered by music journalist Walter Gröbchen, when in 1992 they won a DJ competition on the radio show Die Musicbox, at that time Austria's only program covering independent music.

== Touring and live performances ==
Together with Lee "Scratch" Perry and Ari Up they performed at New York City's Central Park Summerstage in 2009 and with Perry and Adrian Sherwood at the Geometry of Now Festival 2017, in Moscow, Russia. Dubblestandart had previously worked with Perry in 1992 for a series of live shows in Europe.

Dubblestandart toured through Canada in 2006 and 2008, performing at the Vancouver Folk Music Festival, the Vancouver Island Music Festival (website=islandmusicfest.com}, and the Hillside Festival. In 2013 they performed in Goa, India, at the Live At The Console festival with MC Delhi Sultanate and Begum X, who are the lead singers of The Ska Vengers.

== Recording ==
They have released studio albums and singles of their own material as well as various remixes for several artists like Waldeck and Supermax.

The album Egalica was released in 1994 on GiG Records, a label owned by Markus Spiegel. Spiegel also signed Falco for the musician's first recordings. In 1996 Dubblestandart were signed by Christoph Moser to the label, Hoanzl Tonwaren.

Since 2002 Dubblestandart has been signed to the German label Echo Beach, named after the Martha and the Muffins 1979 song, "Echo Beach". The Echo Beach label is based in Hamburg, Germany and was founded by Nicolai Beverungen, who previously worked for Adrian Sherwood's On-U Sound Records, African Head Charge and Zap Mama.

The album IN DUB was produced by Sherwood for On-U Sound Records, London. The album Return From Planet Dub featured "Scratch" Perry and Ari Up, and film director David Lynch on a dub reggae adaptation of Jean Michel Jarre's Oxygen Part 4.

In 2017 Paul Zasky produced a studio album with Austrian singer-songwriter GuGabriel which was released in early 2019. During the 2017 Licht ins Dunkel ('Light Into Darkness') charity campaign, a "telethon" from the Austrian National Broadcasting corporation, ORF, both performed for the president of Austria, Dr Alexander Van der Bellen at his residence, the Vienna Hofburg.

The band produces at GoEast Studios Vienna on mostly original analog equipment. Robbie Ost, who is the studio's owner, was able to purchase a Solide State Mixing console E 6000 for the studio. This mixing board was originally used and owned by Tears For Fears during their 1989 production of the Sowing the Seeds of Love production in London. In the late 1990s, the board was purchased and brought to Vienna.

== Discography ==
=== Albums ===
- The Stupified Eremit (1990, self released)
- Front OF Enemies - Rootscontroller (1990, Rebel Radio)
- Feel the Balance (1992; Rebel Radio)
- Egalica (1995; Gig Records)
- Vienna Dub Melange (1996; Swound Park Products)
- Vibes of this Reality (1997; Geco, Hoanzl Tonwaren)
- Revivals & Sellouts (1999; Geco, Hoanzl Tonwaren)
- Streets of Dub (2002; Select Cuts)
- Heavy Heavy Monster Dub (2004; Echo Beach)
- Are you Experienced (2006; Collision: Cause Of Chapter 3)
- Immigration Dub (2007; Collision: Cause Of Chapter 3)
- Return from Planet Dub (2009; Collision: Cause Of Chapter 3)
- Marijuana Dreams (2010; Collision: Cause Of Chapter 3)
- Woman in Dub (2013; Collision: Cause Of Chapter 3)
- In Dub (2014; Echo Beach)
- Nu School of Planet Dub (2014; Echo Beach)
- Dub Realistic (2016; Echo Beach)
- Reggae Classics (with Firehousecrew 2019, Echo Beach)

=== Singles/EP's ===
- "Dubblestandart Sound Is in the Air" (1995; Gig Records)
- "Music Is the Only Drug" (1997)
- "Rough Rider" (1998, Geco, Hoanzl Tonwaren)
- "Playerhater" (2000 und 2001; Fabrique Records)
- "10 Tons of Dope" (2002; Select Cuts)
- "Kung Fu Fighting" (2004; Select Cuts)
- "Heavy Heavy Monster" (2005)
- "Everything Is Go" (2006)
- "When I Fall in Love"/"Island Girl" (2007; Collision: Cause Of Chapter 3)
- "Chase the Devil – Dubstep" (2009; Elephant House Recordings)
- "Blackboard Jungle Dub – Dubstep" (2009; Subatomic Sound)
- "Chrome Optimism – Dubstep" (2010; Subatomic Sound)
- "Dubstep" (2010; Collision: Cause Of Chapter 3)
- "Dem Can't Stop We From Talk" (2011; Subatomic Sound)
- "Set Me Free" (2018, Echo Beach)

=== Compilations ===
- Time To Act (Aids Charity, Virgin Records, 1993)
- Electronic REsistance (1998, Volkstanz)
- Dancehallfieber 1 (2000, DHF Records, Geco Tonwaren)
- Various – Rare Trax Vol. 15 - Dub And Beyond (2000, Rolling Stone)
- Various – King Size Dub Chapter Seven (2001, Echo Beach)
- Various – King Size Dub Chapter Eight (2002, Echo Beach)
- Waldeck- the Night Garden (2002, Dope Noire)
- Various-Superfabrique (2003, Fabrique Records)
- King Size Dub Reggae Germany Downtown (2003; Echo Beach)
- Various – King Size Dub Chapter Nine (2003; Echo Beach)
- Various – King Size Dub Chapter 10 (2004; Echo Beach)
- Various – Chilled: Mellow Vibes For Evenings In (Mastercuts, 2004)
- Summerchill Classics (2004, Parklane Recordings)
- Carl Douglas – Kung Fu Fighting Remixes (2004, Echo Beach)
- Mikey Dread Bestsellers (2005, Dread At The Controls)
- Various – King Size Dub Chapter 11 (2005, Echo Beach)
- Various – Viva Con Agua De Sankt Pauli (2007, Echo Beach)
- Tempted Love (2008; Visions From The Roof)
- Various – Dub Be Good To Me (2008, Phazz-A-Delic Records)
- Various – Alpine Grooves (2009, Music Park Records)
- Various – King Size Dub - Chapter 69 (2009, Echo Beach)
- Various – King Size Dub Chapter 13 (2009, Echo Beach)
- Various – King Size Dub Chapter 13 (2010, Echo Beach)
- Various – King Size Dub Chapter 15 (2011, Echo Beach)
- Various – Space Is King (From Dub To Dubstep) (2012, Echo Beach)
- Horace Andy – Broken Beats (2013, Echo Beach)
- Various – King Size Dub Special!!! Dubvisionist (2014, Echo Beach)
- Rob Smith a.k.a. RSD* – Mixwork In Dub (2015, Echo Beach)
- King Size Dub Special (2015; Echo Beach)
- Dub Syndicate – Dub Is All I Got (Remix Clash) - Tribute To Style Scott (2015, Echo Beach)
- Robo Bass Hifi – King Size Dub Special (2016, Echo Beach)
- Tackhead – The Lost Tapes Vol. One & Remixes (2017, Echo Beach)
- Sun Ra Remix Album the Heliocentric (2017, Personal Affair)
- Dub In Tape (2017, Personal Affair)

== Collaborations ==
- Sly & Robbie Studio Production
- Mad Professor Remix Production
- Lee Scratch Perry Full Album Production and many live appearances on US (Coachella Festival, Central Park NY with Subatomic Sound System) & European Festivals.
- David Lynch Song Production
- Ari Up Song, Remix, Studio Production and live appearances on US, European & Canadian Festivals
- Caron Wheeler (Soul 2 Soul) Song Production
- Chezere Brathwaite (Urban Species, Jazzanova, Big Audio Dynamite, Don Letts Song Productions & Live Appearances (Coachella ao.)
- Dillinger Song Production & Live appearances on European Festivals
- Sounds From The Ground Remix Production
- Dreadzone Remix Production
- The Rootsman Remix Production
- Keith LeBlanc Remix Production
- Mark Stewart Studio Production
- Supermax Remix Production
- Marcia Griffiths Song Production & Live appearances on European Festivals
- Ken Boothe, Studio Production & Live appearances on European Festivals
- Subatomic Sound System Studio Productions, Live appearances on US, Canadian, Asian & European Festivals
- Mikey Dread Song & Remix Production
- Elephant Man Song 6 Remix Production
- Anthony B Song & Remix Production
- Dub Syndicate Song & Remix Production
- Adrian Sherwood Song, Album, Studio Production, Live Appearances on US & European Festivals, Russia
- Cedric Myton Song Production
- William S. Burroughs Remix Production
- Rob Smith Remix Production
- GuGabriel Song, Album, Remix, Studio production, Live appearances on European Festivals
- Little Axe Remix Production
- Liondub Remix Production
- Oliver Frost Remix Production
- Robo Bass Hifi Remix Production
- Dubmatix Remix Production
