= The Salvation =

The Salvation may refer to:

- The Salvation (album), an album by Skyzoo
- The Salvation (film), a 2014 Danish western film

== See also ==
- Salvation (disambiguation)
