= Ukrainian speculative fiction =

Literary genres in Ukrainian literature and media

Science fiction, fantasy and horror are literary subgenres of speculative fiction (a.k.a. "fantastyka") found in Ukrainian literature and media, written in Ukraine or by Ukrainian writers in both Ukrainian, Russian, Crimean Tatar, & some other languages. The most influential classic writer of Ukrainian science fiction is Oles Berdnyk.

== Language and culture ==
Writing for The Encyclopedia of Science Fiction, Jonathan Clements noted that "Any account of Ukrainian Fantastika must distinguish between works written in Ukraine and works written in Ukrainian". For most of the 20th century, Ukraine was part of the Soviet Union, and before that, the Russian Empire, where Russian language was dominant. Although Ukrainian is now the official language of independent Ukraine, many Ukrainian authors speak and write in Russian, which also allows them access to a larger market. Writing in Ukrainian is, however, becoming increasingly common in the 21st century, also in part due to tensions and conflicts between Ukraine and Russia. Because of that complex history, some writers born in territories of modern Ukraine are not usually considered Ukrainian; for example, Mikhail Bulgakov is commonly described as Russian, even though he was born in Kyiv, Ukraine, and Stanisław Lem as Polish, though he was born in Lviv, Ukraine. Likewise, Nikolai Gogol, one of the originators of Russian fantasy, has Ukrainian origins and often used Ukrainian folk motifs in his works. For these reasons, while Ukrainian literature, including fantasy and science fiction, is increasingly distinctive, traditionally it has close ties with, and has often been analyzed in the context of, the Russian literary tradition.

Some works are also written in other languages, including English, by Ukrainian emigree writers, such as R. B. Lemberg and Anatoly Belilovsky.

== History ==
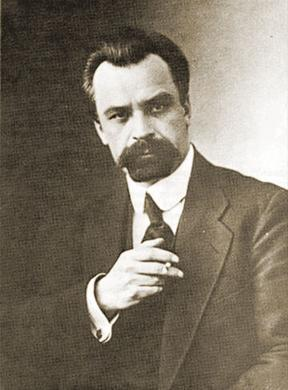
Volodymyr Vynnychenko

As in many other countries, the history of Ukrainian science fiction and fantasy goes back to the beginning of the 20th century, although it draws inspirations from earlier works. The first speculative fiction books created by authors from Ukraine were Ivan Kotlyarevskyi's a novel in verse "Eneida" in Ukrainian (1798). Among those are fantasy & horror works of Orest Somiv and Nikolai Gogol or magic motifs in the poetry of the 19th-century Ukrainian poet Lesya Ukrainka. Over the next century, Ukrainian works would be inspired both by the Russian and Western science fiction and fantasy literature. One of early major influences on Ukrainian speculative fiction would be Kurd Lasswitz ("the father of German science fiction"), whose novel Two Planets was translated to Russian in 1903 (many years before it was translated to English.

Among the first Ukrainian authors of science fiction were Pavlo Krat (1882-1952) and Vasyl Berezhnyi (1918-1988). Krat's works represent utopian social science fiction, whereas Berezhnyi's is the more traditional, adventure- and science-focused classic science fiction-type of literature. Other older generation Ukrainian writers include the author of first Ukrainian-language science fiction novel, written specifically in Ukraine "The Solar Machine"; Volodymyr Vynnychenko, briefly a prime minister of the short-lived Ukrainian People's Republic in the late 1910s; Yuriy Smolych (1900-1976) who was "almost invariably hailed as the patriarch of Ukrainian science fiction",; Volodymyr Vladko (1901-1974), who was called the «Ukrainian Jules Verne»"; he was the author of «The roboters are coming» (Ukrainian: «Ідуть роботарі», 1929), maybe first novel in world science fiction about robots with the use of a similar term; Myroslav Kapiy ("'the progenitor of space voyages in Ukrainian science fiction"), Dmytro Buzko, Mykola Trublaini, Mykola Chaykovskyi, Ivan Kovtun, Mariya Romanivska, Semen Skliarenko and Yuriy Yanowskyi. Other figures of 20 century Ukrainian speculative fiction include figures such as the Soviet-era dissidents Oles Berdnyk, described as the most significant Ukrainian classic science-fiction writer; Mykola Rudenko, Ihor Rosokhovatskyi who coined the Ukrainian word for cyborg, syhom,Mykola Dashkiev, Anatoliy Dimarov, Pavlo Zahrebelnyi, Yuriy Yacheykin, Victor V. Savchenko, Leonid Tendiuk, Vsevolod Nestayko, Valentyn Chemerys, Olexandr Teslenko and Yuriy Shcherbak.

Soviet-era Ukrainian writers writing in Russian include, among others Volodymyr Savchenko, Olexandr Meyerov, Anatoly Dneprov, Mykola Amosov, Svitlana Yahupova, Borys Stern, Leonid Panasenko, Ludmyla Kozynets and others,

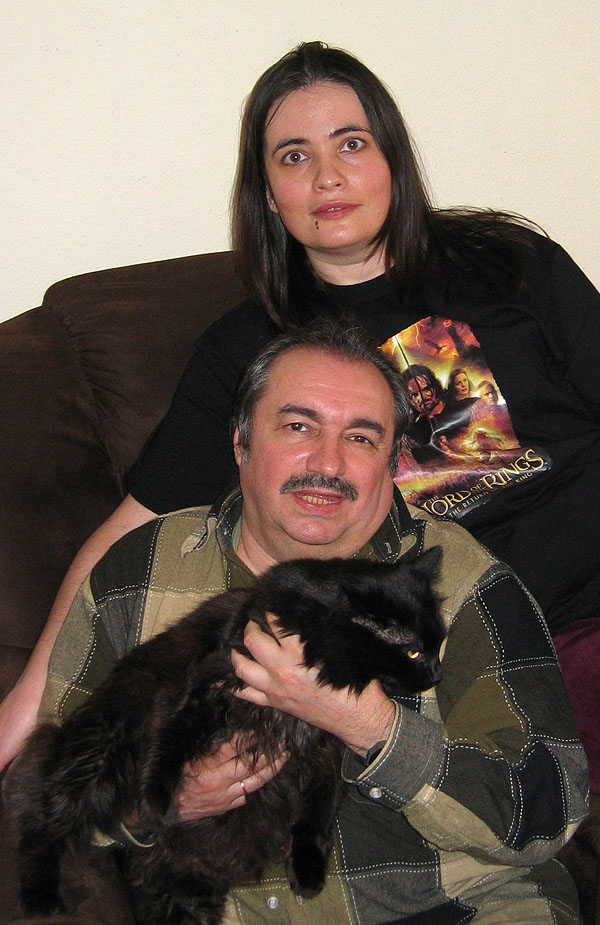
Marina and Sergey Dyachenko

Modern popular Ukrainian science fiction and fantasy writers include Yuriy Vynnychuk, H. L. Oldie, Maryna and Serhiy Dyachenko, Volodymyr Arenev, Max Frei, Oleh Shynkarenko, Andriy Valentynov, Andriy Kurkov, Serhiy Zhadan (author of the novel "Voroshylovgrad", translated into English by Reilly Costigan-Humes and Isaac Wheeler and included by Rachel Cordasco in the list of 100 must-read works of speculative fiction in translation), Volodymyr Yeshkilev, Lesya Voronyna, Kapranov brothers, Simona Vilar, Yana Dubynianska, Natalia Scherba, Natalia Matolinets, Yevhen Lir, Yaryna Katorozh, Iryna Hrabovska, Natalia Dovhopol, Svitlana Taratorina, Oleh Sentsov, Pavlo Derevianko, Daria Piskozub, and Max Kidruk.

One of the modern russian-language most controversial writers is Fyodor Berezin, a writer born in the Donetsk and associated with the unrecognized Donetsk People's Republic, whose military science fiction represents an extreme pro-Russian viewpoint.

The most prominent authors of alternative history in Ukraine are Vasyl Kozhelianko (author of the novel "Parade in Moscow", 2000; and many other) & Oleksandr Irvanets (author of the novel "Rivne/Rovno", 2002).

== Themes and genres ==
Traditionally, science fiction was much more popular in Ukrainian literature than fantasy, but that began to change in the recent decades. The first anthology of Ukrainian fantasy stories was published in 1990 (Ohnenyi zmiy, The Fiery Dragon), and the first anthology of horror stories in 2000 (Antolohiya ukrainskoho zhakhu, The Anthology of Ukrainian Horror Fiction); the latter was soon followed by another anthology in 2001 (Nichnyi pryvyd: antolohiia ukrainskoi hotychnoi prozy XIX stolittia, A Night Spectre: the Anthology of Ukrainian Gothic Prose from the 19th Century).

According to Smyrniw, major themes of the 20th century Ukrainian science fiction include space travel, time travel, alien contact, robots, androids, and cyborgs.

== Fandom ==
Fantasy and science fiction fandom in Ukraine has been described as strong, as evidenced by the fact that Kyiv has been a host of the Eurocon twice (in 2006 and 2013).

== Reception ==
Like Russian, Ukrainian science fiction and fantasy is popular in Poland. Among the most popular Ukrainian science fiction and fantasy writers in Poland and Russian-speaking countries are Maryna and Serhiy Dyachenko.

Ukrainian works are sometimes translated to English, although this not very common. Most famous anthologies in english «Embroidered Worlds: Fantastic Fiction from Ukraine & the Diaspora» & «The Fantastic Worlds of Yuri Vynnychuk»

Ukrainian fantasy and science fiction have been subject to a 2013 monograph by Walter Smyrniw (Ukrainian Science Fiction: Historical and Thematic Perspectives).
