= Sigismundus Suevus =

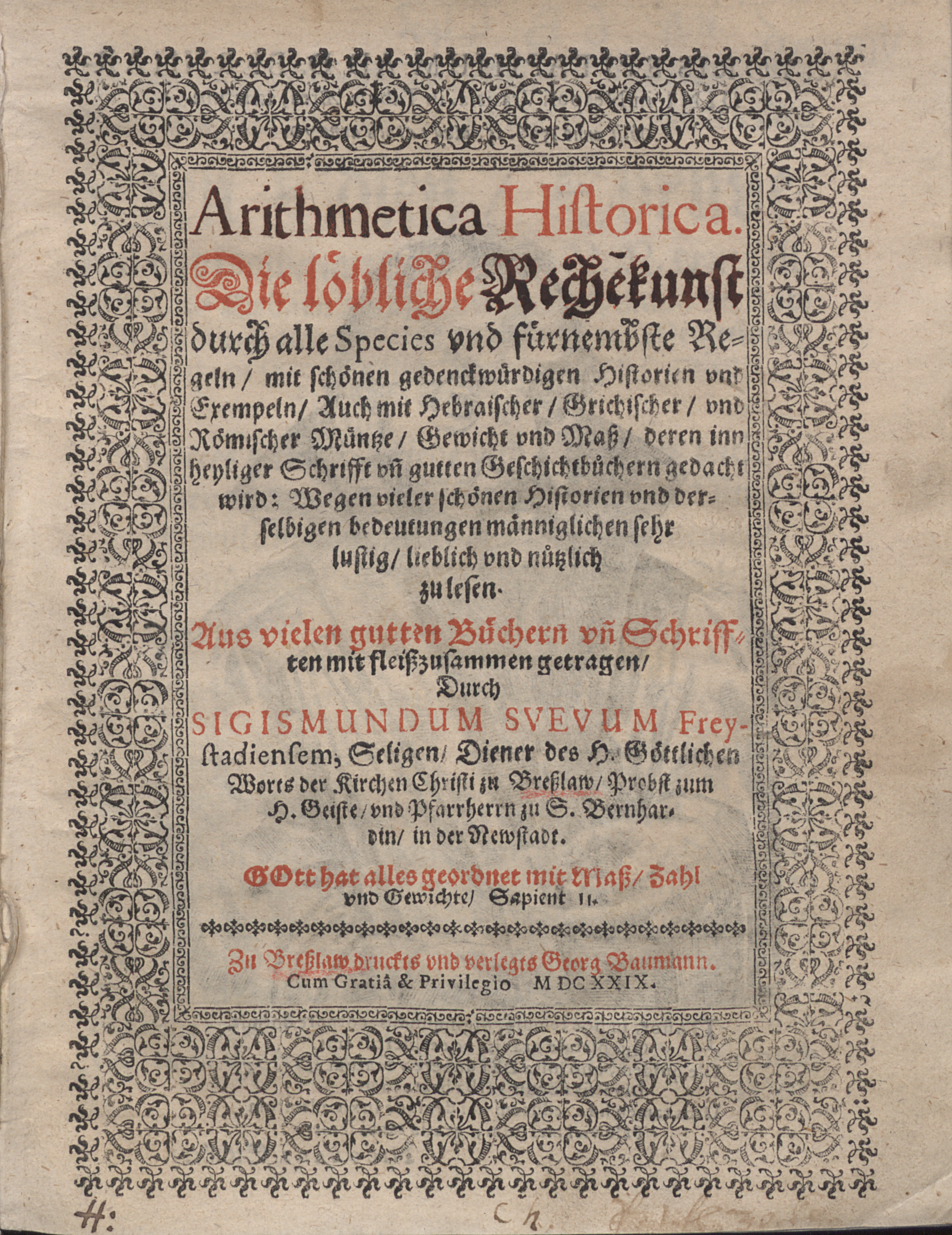
Arithmetica Historica, 1629

Sigismund Schwabe, known by his Latin name Sigismundus Suevus (Freistadt, 1526–1596), was a German mathematician and Evangelical theologian. He was also a musician and poet.

== Life ==
He was born in Freistadt, Silesia. A well known student of Melanchthon, he studied in Reval (Tallinn) around 1550. He was preacher in Lubań, Silesia, and after 1586 priest in Breslau.

His Arithmetica Historica ("Historical Arithmetic", 1593) was conceived to prepare for the Last Judgment by combining Biblical teaching and arithmetical knowledge.

== Works ==
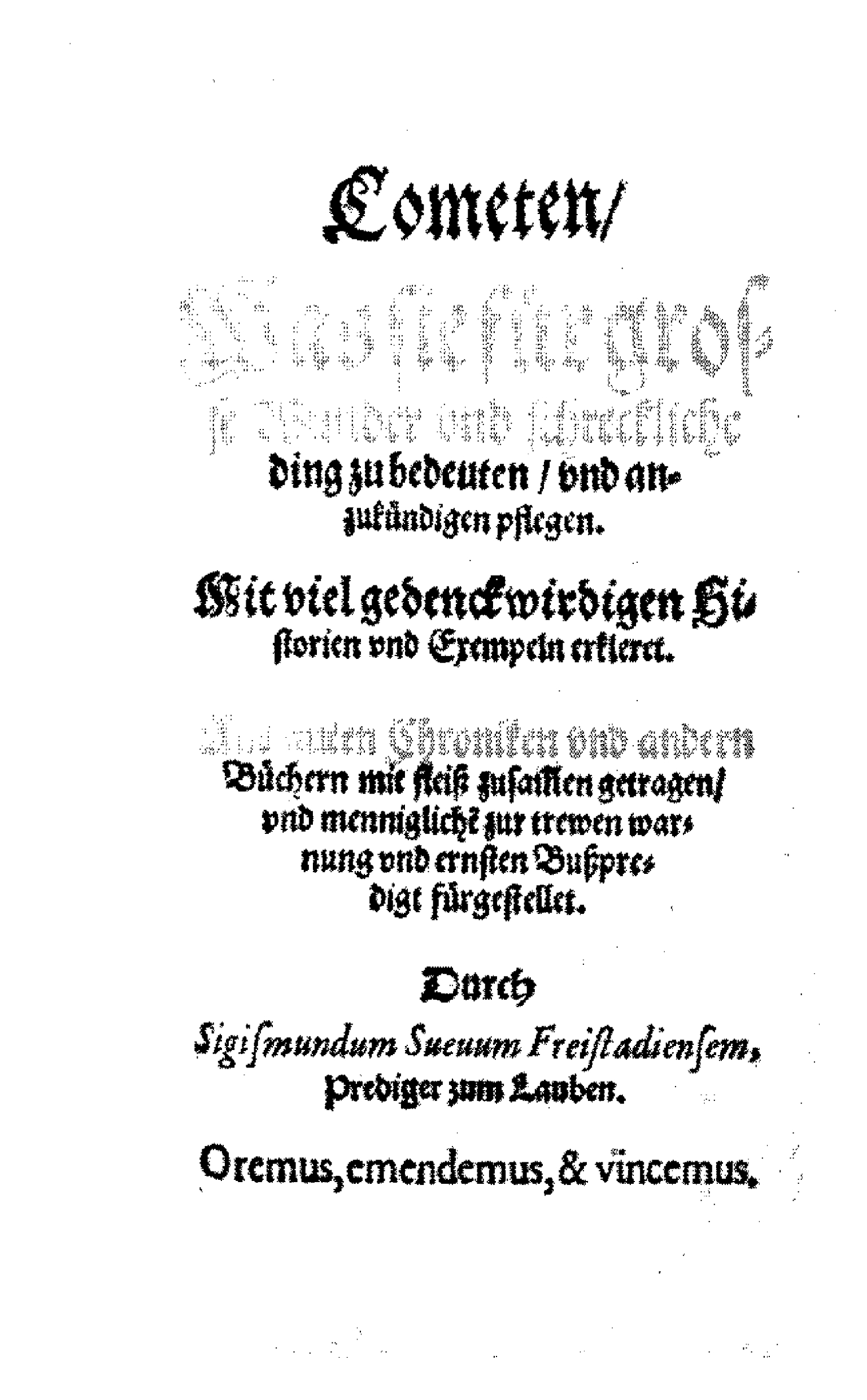
Cometen, 1578

- Cometen (in German). Görlitz: Ambrosius Fritsch. 1578.
- Arithmetica Historica (in German). Breslau: Georg Baumann. 1629.
