= Love Machine =

Love Machine may refer to:

== Music ==
- The Love Machine (album), 2001, by Sandra Bernhard
- Love Machine (album), 1991, by Brighton Rock
- We Love Machine (album), 2009, by Way Out West

Songs

- "The Love Machine" (Elvis Presley song), 1967
- "Love Machine" (The Miracles song), 1975
- "Love Machine" (Morning Musume song), 1999
- "Love Machine" (Girls Aloud song), 2004
- "Love Machine", a 1968 song by The O'Kaysions
- "Love Machine", a 1971 song by Uriah Heep from the album Look at Yourself
- "Lovemachine", a 1978 song by Supermax from the album World of Today
- "L.O.V.E. Machine", a 1984 song by W.A.S.P. from the album W.A.S.P.
- "Love Machine", a 2007 song by Melissa Mars
- "Love Machine", a 1990 song by The Time from the soundtrack album Graffiti Bridge
- "Luv Machine", a 1998 song by Blonde Redhead from the album In an Expression of the Inexpressible

== Other uses ==
- Art Barr (1966–1994), American professional wrestler who wrestled in Mexico as "The American Love Machine" and "The Love Machine"
- The Love Machine (novel), a 1969 novel by Jacqueline Susann
- The Love Machine (film), a 1971 adaptation of the novel
- The Love Machine (TV series), British dating show
- Love Machine, 1970s British dance troupe known from The Benny Hill Show
- "Love Machine", television series episode of Haven
- Love Machine, animated film character from Summer Wars

== See also ==
- Love tester machine
