= Salvation (disambiguation) =

Salvation is the state of being saved or protected from harm or a dire situation.

Salvation may also refer to:

== Film and television ==
=== Film ===
- Salvation!, a 1987 American black comedy film
- Salvation (2008 film), an Australian film
- Salvation (2026 film), a drama film
- The Salvation (film), a 2014 Danish Western
- Moksha: Salvation, a 2001 Indian film
- Terminator Salvation, a 2009 film in the Terminator series

=== Television ===
- Salvation (TV series), 2017 American TV series
- "Salvation" (Alias episode), 2002
- "Salvation" (Arrow), 2013 episode
- "Salvation" (Smallville), 2010
- "Salvation" (Supernatural), 2006 episode

== Music ==
- Salvation (American band), a late-1960s American psychedelic rock band
- Salvation (UK band), an English post-punk band
- Salvation (musical), a 1969 off-Broadway rock musical

=== Albums ===
- Salvation (Alphaville album), 1997
- Salvation (Cult of Luna album), 2004
- Salvation (Bill Hicks album), 2005
- Salvation (Byzantine video album), 2007
- Salvation (Smack album), 1987
- The Salvation (album), by Skyzoo, 2009
- Salvation (EP), 2025

=== Songs ===
- "Salvation" (The Cranberries song), 1996
- "Salvation" (Gabrielle Aplin song), 2013
- "Salvation" (GuGabriel song), 2012
- "Salvation" (ManuElla song), 2017
- "Salvation" (Rancid song), 1995
- "Salvation" (Roxette song), 1999
- "Salvation", by Black Rebel Motorcycle Club from B.R.M.C., 2001
- "Salvation", by Bongzilla from their album Apogee, 2000
- "Salvation", by the Devil Wears Prada from Dear Love: A Beautiful Discord, 2006
- "Salvation", by Elton John from Honky Château, 1972
- "Salvation", by In This Moment from Ritual, 2017
- "Salvation", from Michael Learns to Rock, 2004
- "Salvation", by Pestilence from Doctrine, 2011
- "Salvation", by Rebecca Black of Salvation, 2025
- "Salvation", by War of Ages from Arise and Conquer, 2008
- "Salvation", by John Van Tongeren to the American TV series The 4400

== Other uses ==
- Salvation (novel), a 1999 Doctor Who novel
- Salvation, a 2018 novel by Peter F. Hamilton
- Salvation (video game), unreleased
- Salvation (wrestler), ring name of Jesse Neal (born 1980)
- Salvation Group, a former British media company
- Salvation, a fictional planet in the 2007–2008 DC Comics Salvation Run series

== See also ==
- Save (disambiguation)
- Solvation, the interaction of solvent with dissolved molecules
- The Salvation Army, a Christian church and charitable organisation
