= Mykola Chaikovsky =

Ukrainian teacher, mathematician and writer

Mykola Chaikovsky, 1919

Mykola Chaikovsky or Chaykovskyi (Ukrainian: Микола Андрійович Чайковський; 2 January 1887 – 7 October 1970) was a Ukrainian teacher, mathematician and writer. He is the author of By the Power of the Sun (1918), one of the first works of Ukrainian science fiction.

== Biography ==
Chaikovsky was born in Berezhany, Galicia (at that time a part of Austria-Hungary), on 2 January 1887. He was the first son of lawyer and writer, Andrii Chaikovsky. From 1897 to 1905, Chaikovsky studied in the local gymnasium (the Berezhany Gymnasium). For two years, he attended the University of Prague, where he studied mechanics and philosophy. He then moved to the University of Vienna, also studying philosophy, although he was increasingly interested in mathematics. Chaikovsky received a PhD degree in 1911. In 1913 he became a full member of the Shevchenko Scientific Society.

After 1910, Chaikovsky briefly worked in Ternopil at a Ukrainian school. He got married in 1912. Chaikovsky also briefly worked at the University of Berlin and at a school in Austria. In World War I, he was a translator and educator at a camp for Russian prisoners of war in Vienna; he also worked as a teacher at a real school in Rava-Ruska.

Chaikovsky was involved with the Union for the Liberation of Ukraine, and spent some time in Freistadt, Germany, from 1914 to 1918. After World War I, he became a teacher in Galicia (a Privatdozent at Kamianets-Podilskyi Ivan Ohiienko National University). He also held teaching positions at a girls' gymnasium and at a private university in Lviv. In 1923 or 1929, he became a professor at a high school in Odessa (Institute of People's Education in Odesa - Одеський інститут народної освіти, ОІНО). He was also a director of a private gymnasium in Yavoriv in 1924, and in 1927, director of another gymnasium in Rohatyn.

The Soviet authorities persecuted Chaikovsky in the 1930s, first arresting him as a "Polish spy" with alleged ties to the Ukrainian Military Organization in March 1933. He was sentenced to 10 years in a labor camp where he worked as a prison laborer in Karelia and Arkhangelsk, surviving the gruesome working conditions during the construction of the White Sea–Baltic Canal.

After his release, he worked in Tomsk and as a teacher or a university professor from 1944 to 1947 in Semipalatinsk at the pedagogical institute, and then at the Ural State Pedagogical University. Chaikovsky returned to Ukraine in May 1954 and was declared rehabilitated in 1956. That same year, he became a professor at Lviv Pedagogical Institute, and in 1961 he joined Lviv University (in USSR following the territorial changes after World War II). He died in Lviv on 7 October 1970, and was buried at the Lychakiv Cemetery.

== Works ==
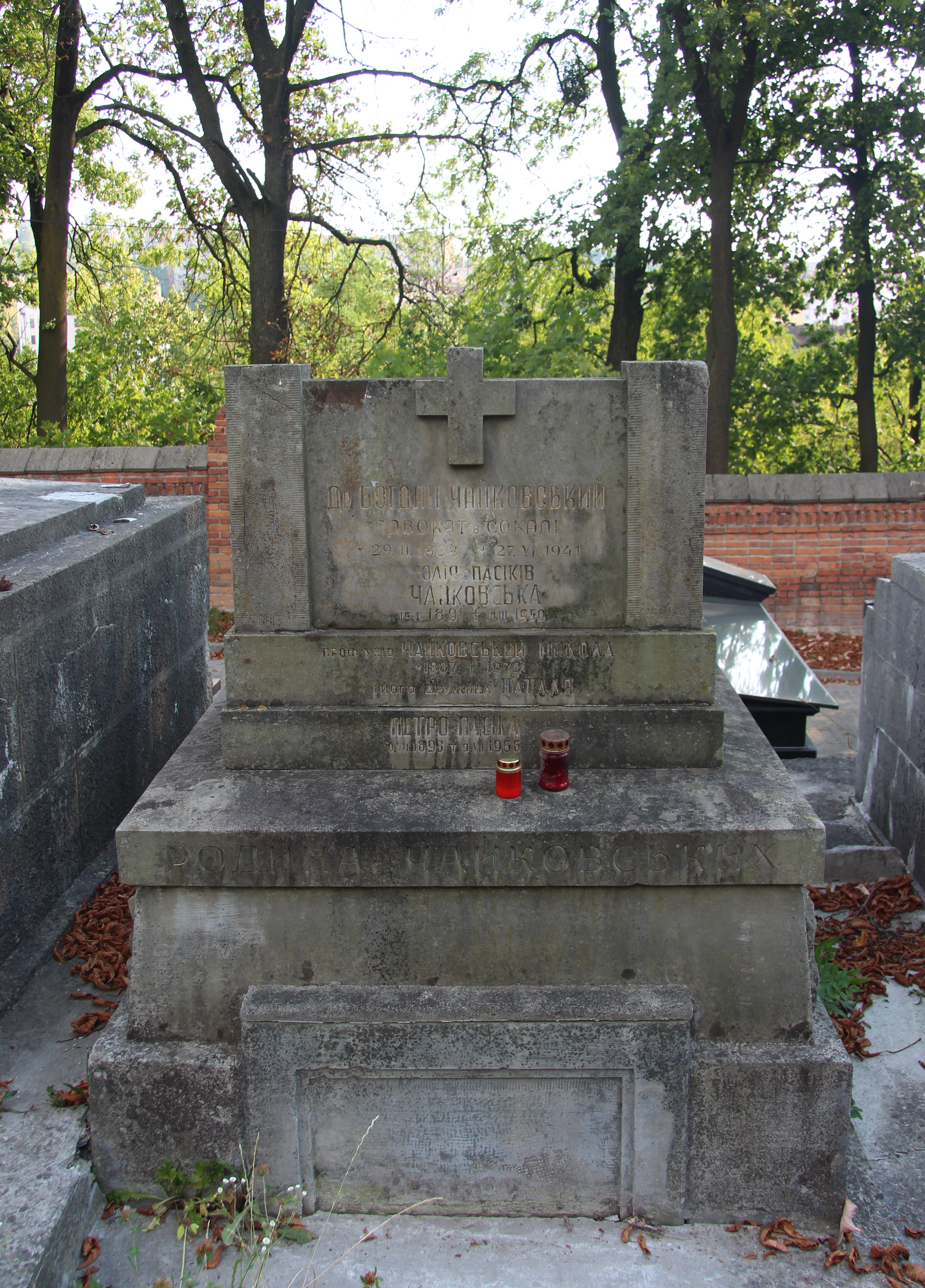
Tomb of the Chaikovsky family, Lychakiv Cemetery, Lviv

Chaikovsky published his first article, an academic article on mathematics, in 1908. In 1915, he published a book on solar and lunar eclipses. He compiled a dictionary of mathematical terminology in Ukrainian (1924) and wrote other academic articles, as well as textbooks on mathematics. In 1931, he published the Ukrainian Scientific Mathematical Bibliography (1931). His bibliography includes a total of 193 scientific works in mathematics alone. Chaikovsky also wrote 51 articles for the Ukrainian Soviet Encyclopedia. As a scientist, his research concerned the topic of geometrization of school algebra.

Chaikovsky wrote By the Power of the Sun (За силу сонця, Za syly sontsia) in 1918, considered one of the first works of Ukrainian science fiction, as well as one of the first Ukrainian-language works in science fiction. The book was published by the Ukrainian Pedagogical Society in Lviv (then Poland) seven years later. In the story, the protagonist Mykhailo Rozdvyanskyi, a brilliant engineer-physicist and aeronaut (professor at the Kyiv Engineering Academy and director of the First State Aviation Plant), invents ways to harness solar energy through photovoltaic "black glass" and discovers novel "omega rays". Chaikovsky imagined an independent Ukraine as a world pioneer in solar power, with spies from other countries and Luddites trying to steal or suppress the valuable Ukrainian technology. The work is also notable as one of the first works that describes the concept of a radiotelephone. As it was published in Poland, the novel did not become well known in Ukraine, and it was neither republished nor mentioned in literary criticism in the Soviet Union, leaving it sidelined during the formative stage of Ukrainian science fiction in the 1920s and 1930s.

In 1926, Chaikovsky published a future studies essay entitled "Technology of Tomorrow", also in Lviv.

== Remembrance ==
The Parliament of Ukraine (Verkhovna Rada) declared 2 January 2017, as a celebration of the 130th anniversary of Chaikovsky's birth.
