= GuGabriel =

Gudrun Gabriele Liemberger
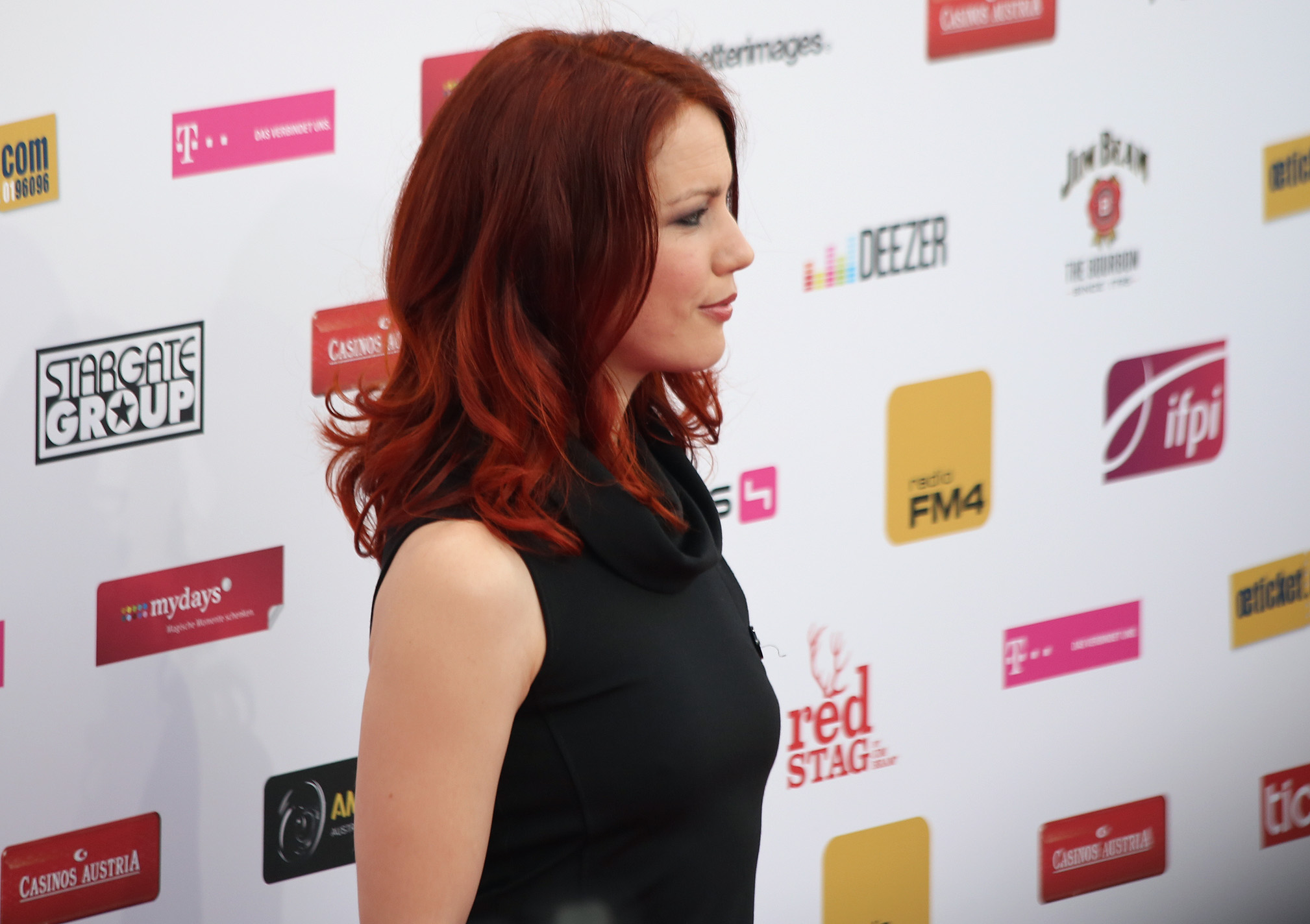

Background information
- Born: Freistadt, Austria
- Origin: Freistadt, Austria
- Genres: Pop, Folk, Rock
- Years active: 2010–present
- Website: Official Website

Gudrun Gabriele Liemberger (born in Freistadt) known by her stage name GuGabriel, is an Austrian singer-songwriter and musician. She is most famous for her single "Salvation" which has peaked to number 19 on the Austrian Singles Chart.

== Music career ==
=== 2011: Anima(L) ===
On May 27, 2011 she released her debut single "Reason". On June 3, 2011 she released her debut studio album Anima(L). On November 18, 2011 she released a single called "Poor Little Joé" which was the main title song from the movie The Poor Little Matchgirl. 2012: 2004 bildete sich die Band "She Says". 2005 landete Gudrun mit"She Says - Rosegardens" einen Megahit. Das Album "She Says" war 2006 Nummer eins in den Österreichischen Albumcharts. Ausserdem erhielt Sie 2006 auch den Amadeus Award.

=== 2012-present: Second studio album ===
On July 7, 2012 she released a single called "Salvation", it entered the Austrian Singles Chart at number 37 and has peaked to number 19.

== Discography ==
=== Albums ===
Title	Album details
Anima(L)	Released: June 3, 2011; Label: Nomad Records; Formats: CD, digital download

=== Singles ===
Title	Year	Peak chart positions	Album
Title	Year	AUT	Album
2011	"Reason"	—	Anima(L)
2011	"Poor Little Joé"	—	
2012	"Salvation"	19	
2012	"Adam & Eve"	—	
2014	"Breaking Through"	—	
2016	"What About Us"	—	
2016	"A Little Bit Of Love	—	
