= Oles Berdnyk =

Ukrainian science fiction writer (1926–2003)

- Олесь Бердник
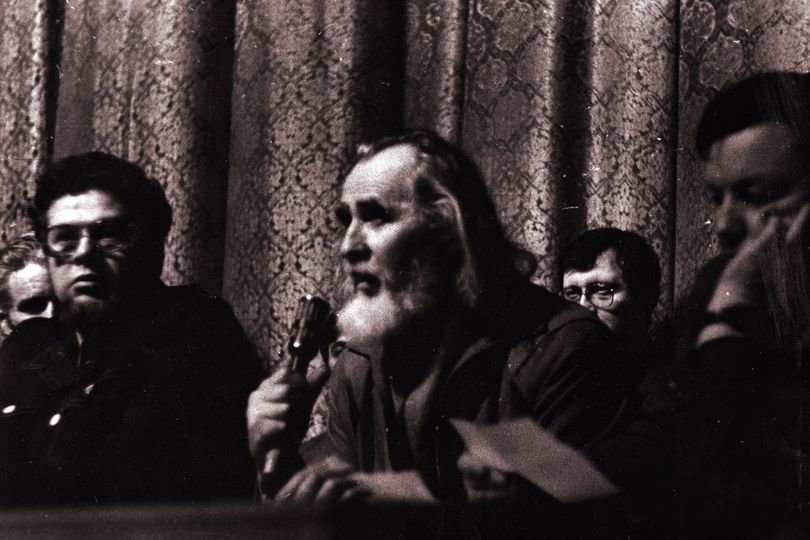
- Berdnyk in 1988
- Born: 27 November 1926; Vavylove, Ukrainian SSR, Soviet Union
- Died: 18 March 2003 (aged 76); Kyiv, Ukraine
- Known for: Science fiction writing; being a dissident
- Notable work: Apostle of Immortality: Ukrainian Science Fiction, Fantastic Encounters, Star Corsair, Prometheus

Oleksandr (Oles) Pavlovych Berdnyk (Ukrainian: Олександр (Олесь) Павлович Бердник; 27 November 1926 (Note: officially 25 December 1927) – 18 March 2003) was a Ukrainian science fiction writer, futurist and globalist, philosopher and theologian, public figure and dissident. A Red Army veteran of World War II, he spent many years as a political prisoner in Soviet camps. Berdnyk wrote more than 20 novels and short stories that have been translated into many languages, including English, German, French, Russian, and Hungarian. He has been described as the most influential classic writer of Ukrainian science fiction.

== Biography ==
As a child, Berdnyk survived the Holodomor, during which both of his granfathers died. In his youth he participated in the Second World War. In 1945-1949 Berdnyk was a student at the Ivan Franko National Academic Drama Theater. In 1949 he was arrested for "state treason", and next year sentenced to 10 years of imprisonment in labour camps. The real cause of Berdnyk's imprisonment was reported to be his opposition to the editing of classical drama works by Communist Party officials. In 1953 he received a second 10-year term, but was pardoned in 1955 and returned to Ukraine.

Berdnyk started to write while in prison. He published his first story after liberation in 1956. In 1957 Berdnyk became a member of the Writers' Union of Ukraine. Until 1972, he had published around 20 works of science fiction. Berdnyk created the script for the 1963 movie Mechte Navstrechu by Odesa Film Studios, which was adopted three years later in the United States as Queen of Blood. However, in 1973 Berdnyk was expelled from the Writers' Union of Ukraine after being accused of deviating from the norms of Socialist Realism.

Berdnyk's works were condemned by Soviet press for being "anti-scientific" and containing elements of "occultism" and "space nationalism". As a result, his books were removed from shops and libraries, and in order to support himself he was forced to work as a stained glass decorator. Berdnyk was a founding member of the Ukrainian Helsinki Group. Between 1976 and 1979, he authored numerous open letters and memorandums directed against violations of human rights in the Soviet Union. He was arrested in 1979 and sentenced to six years in labour camps and three years in exile. He spent his sentence in Perm and Kazakhstan. Berdnyk was pardoned in 1984, after formally repenting his views.

After returning from exile, Berdnyk settled in the village of Hrebeni. Known mostly for his prose works, he also wrote poems, acted as a publicist and author of political programs, created paintings and composed music to his own verse. In 1989 he contributed to the establishment of a kobzar college in the village of Stritivka, Kyiv Oblast. During the same year he founded the Humanist Association "Ukrainian Spiritual Republic" (UDR). The organization was conceived as a union of free creators and workers united against bureaucracy, militarism and totalitarianism. UDR's annual spiritual gatherings took place in Vytachiv, where its members erected a chapel designed after a drawing by Taras Shevchenko.

Berdnyk died in 2003, two years after suffering a severe stroke, which had left him incapacitated.

== Views ==
Berdnyk was influenced by the theory of noosphere developed by Volodymyr Vernadsky. An opponent of militarism, consumerism and political cynicism, he viewed the Soviet system as a mere part of the global technocratic-positivist civilization, which according to him, lacked spiritual and moral depth. He emphasized protection of ecology as a way to evade future natural disasters and preserve the humanity's spiritual values. During the 1970s Berdnyk authored a "Testament to People of the Earth", which called for humanity to spare their planet's resources in order to prevent self-destruction. In 1986 he wrote a philosophical essay dedicated to "alternative evolution" and formation of a new society based on Wisdom, Knowledge, Love and Beauty, which was presented to the United Nations.

== Family ==
Hromovytsia Berdnyk in 2019

Berdnyk's mother, nicknamed Marusia, was said to have fought in the ranks of Otaman Zelenyi's rebels.

Berdnyk's second wife Valentyna Sokorynska-Berdnyk stemmed from Vinnytsia Oblast; her family was forced to leave their native village in order to survive Holodomor.

Berdnyk's daughter Hromovytsia Berdnyk (Ukrainian: Громовиця Бердник) is a writer and culturologist. His other daughter Myroslava Bernyk, a blogger and publicist, was in 2016 accused by the Security Service of Ukraine of spreading calls for an overthrow of Ukraine's constitutional order in coordination with Russian representatives.

== Notable publications ==
=== Short stories ===
- Beyond Time and Space (Поза часом і простором, 1956)
- A Ghost is Walking on the Earth (Привид іде по Землі, 1958)
- The Heart of the Universe (Серце Всесвіту, 1962)
- Star Rider (Зоряний вершник, 1967)
- The Blanket of Isis (Покривало Ізіди, 1988)

=== Novels ===
- The Ways of Titans (Шляхи титанів, 1958)
- The Arrow of Time (Стріла часу, 1960)
- Who are You? (Хто ти?, 1966)
- The Cup of Amrita (Чаша Амріти, 1968)
- Star Corsair (Зоряний корсар, 1971)

== Legacy ==
Berdnyk's literary works achieved great popularity among Ukrainian readers in rural areas and small towns, although inhabitants of larger cities generally preferred to read Russian science fiction.

In 2020 one of new streets in Sviatoshynskyi District of Kyiv was named in honour of Berdnyk.

== See also ==
- Ukrainian Helsinki Group
- Soviet dissidents
- List of Slavic Native Faith's organisations
- Slavic Native Faith
- Mykhailo Melnyk
