= Star Corsair =

1971 science fiction novel by Oles Berdnyk

- Cover of the 1971 edition of the novel
- Author: Oles Berdnyk
- Original title: Зоряний корсар
- Language: Ukrainian
- Genre: Science fiction, Philosophical novel
- Publisher: Raduga Publishers
- Publication date: 1971
- Publication place: Soviet Union
- Media type: Hardcover
- Pages: 376
- Followed by: Dazhboh's Tuning Fork

Star Corsair (Ukrainian: Зоряний корсар, also known as Rings of the Serpent) is a science fiction and philosophical novel by Ukrainian Soviet writer Oles Berdnyk. Widely regarded by literary critics as the pinnacle of Berdnyk's work, the novel explores profound themes of human spirituality and societal evolution. An excerpt titled "Interstellar Nanny" was first published in 1961 in the Kyiv Russian-language newspaper Komsomolskoye Znamya. Another excerpt, "Last Judgment", appeared in 1965 in the journal Lyudyna i Svit. In 1968, the novella "Rebellion of the Cosmocrats" was published in Ranok, originally intended for an uncompleted fantastical novel-fairy tale, Judge and Love, but was incorporated into Star Corsair. In 1971, excerpts from the novella "UR" were published in the newspaper Moloda Hvardiya, which were included unchanged in the full novel published that year by Raduga Publishers. However, much of the print run was seized by Soviet censors and removed from libraries and bookstores. Despite this, the novel became a cult classic among the Ukrainian intelligentsia and was frequently republished, primarily by the Ukrainian diaspora, as well as in foreign languages. The first Russian translation was published in 1991. In the Ukrainian SSR, it was republished in 1989, followed by multiple reprints in independent Ukraine, including a 1995 edition alongside its sequel, Dazhboh's Tuning Fork.

== Themes ==
The novel's central themes revolve around the development of human spirituality, the evolution of society, and the physical and spiritual perfection of humanity. These are linked not only to humanity's expansion into interplanetary and intergalactic space but also to transcending the three-dimensional realm into multidimensionality. It emphasizes the uniqueness of the human soul, the freedom to choose one's destiny and lifestyle, and the necessity of continuous creative development for both individuals and society. The novel critiques societal stagnation, excessive regulation, and restrictions on progress. Its depiction of a despotic society on the planet Ara, resembling a socialist system and potentially alluding to the Soviet regime, led to its ban in the Soviet Union. Berdnyk faced accusations of nationalism, promoting mysticism, and idealism, resulting in his expulsion from the Writers' Union of the USSR. The novel's depiction of cosmonauts ascending Hoverla in 2082, adorned with Ukrainian folk art, clashed with Soviet ideology, which envisioned a unified "Soviet people" erasing national identities after achieving communism.

Berdnyk stated that the character of the Star Corsair, Goryor, symbolizes Jesus Christ as a rebel against evil and a guide to a world of joy and love.

== Plot ==
=== Part One ===
The novel begins with Ukrainian scientist Serhiy Horenytsia researching the nature of time, particularly its flow and the possibility of altering its unidirectional progression. During his contemplations, he envisions a Zaporozhian Cossack-sorcerer, Vohnevyky, wielding a "Black Charter", a device that communicates and predicts future events. Horenytsia hypothesizes it is an artifact from an advanced alien civilization capable of manipulating time.

With a friend skilled in hypnosis, Horenytsia undergoes a hypnotic journey to embody Vohnevyky and learn about the Black Charter. He enters the Cossack's consciousness, learning the device came from a Turk captured by Cossacks, who acquired it in Egypt, possibly from Alexander the Great's tomb. Vohnevyky's tale is interrupted by a battle with a Tatar raid, in which he and his companions perish. A Cossack detachment later defeats the Tatars and buries the Black Charter with Vohnevyky near Divych-Hora, though multiple Ukrainian hills bear this name. Horenytsia's archaeological dig at one such site fails.

After losing his fiancée and defending his doctoral dissertation on "Problems of Multidimensionality", Horenytsia locates the Black Charter, which he calls the Black Papyrus. Engaging with it, he inquires about conquering time. The Papyrus advises shifting humanity's approach to understanding the world toward love and mutual understanding, noting that mechanical machines cannot reach the highest levels of cognition, though they may eventually develop such awareness. It shows Horenytsia a vision of Earth in 2082, where the spaceship Love, crewed by seven couples including Ukrainians Bohdan and Lesya Polumyani, departs for Epsilon Eridani to establish a colony. Equipped with technology to restore crew members' psychic and genetic codes, the mission adjusts course after detecting signals from intelligent beings on a star halfway to Epsilon Eridani.

Lesya, pregnant, gives birth to twin sons during the journey. The ship encounters a radiation surge, killing the crew except the newborns, protected in an isolated compartment. The ship's Universal Robot (UR) assumes a human-like form to raise the children and navigates to the signal-emitting planet, covered in dense forests and an ocean. UR detects signal-transmitting towers but finds only mobile, predatory plants. For safety, UR keeps the boys on the ship for years, completing their education before exploring the planet. They investigate the towers but find no intelligent life. Aerial tree-like predators kidnap the boys, but UR rescues them after miniature flowers attack the predators. The boys are poisoned, but the flowers, revealed as the planet's intelligent inhabitants, provide an antidote. These plants, survivors of a cosmic catastrophe, mastered hyperspace travel with minimal energy.

UR decodes the planet's signals, revealing they originate from another star system where an advanced civilization stagnated after technology eliminated the need for labor, leading to societal degradation. UR and the boys visit this planet, finding abandoned satellites and a population engaged only in basic needs, served by automatons. After extensive searching, they meet Iswari, the last non-degraded inhabitant, who maintains the planet's central synthesizer. She joins the crew, receiving permission to return to Earth. Iswari falls in love with UR, who reciprocates but struggles with his robotic nature. Using the ship's technology, UR constructs a human body from the boys' parents' cells. Upon returning to Earth, the crew is revived, and UR, now human, pursues a life with Iswari, planning to revisit the flower planet and awaken the degraded civilization. Horenytsia realizes the Black Papyrus models infinity, offering answers to philosophical questions and insights into his soul.

=== Part Two ===
The second part follows young criminologist Gryhoriy Bova, aspiring to be a modern Sherlock Holmes, studying cybernetics, genetics, religious history, esotericism, Sanskrit, and Esperanto. His superior tasks him with locating Kurinny, a distillery director missing for three years after a hunting trip, amid a discovered embezzlement (Note: The novel mentions 300,000, likely in Soviet rubles, given the publication context.). Kurinny's wife died, leaving his daughter Halyna, a nurse in a Kyiv hospital. Bova meets Halyna to investigate her father's whereabouts, and they fall in love.

In a dream, Bova is transported to Ara, a planet far advanced beyond Earth, where immortal beings enjoy unlimited resources but suffer from apathy, mental degradation, and rising juvenile crime and suicide attempts, thwarted by automatons. Bova embodies Mercury, a cosmic investigator loyal to Ara's coordinator, Ariman. Children confront Mercury, denouncing Ara's system as veiled slavery. At a planetary congress, Ariman expresses concern over declining psychopotential. Scientists propose destroying Ara to create a new world or reverting to primitivism. Ariman suggests creating a three-dimensional world to siphon Ara's energy, controlling its conflicts. Cosmocrats, led by Gorykorin and including Bova's dream-lover Hromovytsia, reject this as criminal, advocating transcendence into multidimensionality. Ariman imprisons them and pursues his plan. Bova shares this dream with Halyna, who believes it connects to their fate.

In another dream, Ara's psychopotential rises by exploiting the new world, but the cosmocrats escape. Ariman tasks Mercury with recapturing them, linking their escape to the forbidden Star Corsair, Goryor. Mercury researches Goryor, a former ally of Ara's ruler Kareos, who prioritized material needs over development, leading to involution. Kareos imprisoned Goryor in a psychiatric hospital, declaring him dead. Goryor escaped with Aeras, who achieved cosmic consciousness, enabling levitation and intangibility. They founded a colony on the Asteroid of Freedom, encouraging self-perfection. Goryor intercepted Ara's ships, convincing many to join his cause. Kareos sent his fiancée, Gledis, to kill Goryor, but she joined him. Goryor rescued her from execution, and they transcended into another dimension, evading Kareos, who later died.

Mercury learns Goryor and Gledis aided the cosmocrats' escape, offering them life on a three-dimensional planet—Earth—to foster revolution and change, with a universal informer to preserve their origins. Mercury informs Ariman, who orders their destruction. On Earth, Mercury, injured and amnesiac, becomes a primitive human, ending Bova's dream.

Bova learns Kurinny has been found, but soon Halyna and her father are reported murdered in Kyiv. Kurinny carried an indestructible goblet that vanished. He claimed to have been "in another world", leading to his psychiatric commitment. Bova notices the female victim is not Halyna. At the psychiatric hospital, Kurinny's records reveal he entered a parallel universe during his hunt, meeting ancestors who condemned his distillery work. They shared a goblet of "immortality wine", but Kurinny, deemed unworthy, found it empty. He returned with the goblet after three years.

Ariman sends a new investigator, Yagu, to Earth, who kills Kurinny and sends Halyna (Hromovytsia) to a 19th-century monastery, where another cosmocrat, Yuliana (Maria), resides. Serhiy Horenytsia is identified as Gorykorin, and Bova as Mercury. Ariman arrives on Earth, disguised as an Indian named Singh, to confront the cosmocrats. Bova finds monastery records of a nun, Vasylina, claiming to be Halyna, deemed possessed. He consults Horenytsia, who conducts a time travel experiment. Bova locates Halyna and Yuliana, but Ariman arrives, claiming he killed Gorykorin and demanding the ancient goblet. The Star Corsair, Goryor, appears, giving the goblet to Hromovytsia, who drinks the immortality wine. Goryor declares the unification of time streams, enabling humanity's union with the noosphere. Ariman vanishes, and Goryor reveals Gorykorin is alive, urging the cosmocrats to continue their fight for humanity's spiritual and physical evolution.

== Reception ==
Initially, Moscow-based literary journals and critics harshly criticized the novel, accusing Berdnyk of "cosmic nationalism", "Ukrainian chauvinism in space", and anti-Soviet views. However, it received positive reviews in foreign reprints. Modern critics reinterpret its philosophy. In the 2007 edition's foreword, philosopher Volodymyr Vasyliovych Ilyin notes the novel depicts a world of eternal struggle between good and evil, emphasizing continuous spiritual growth, individual uniqueness, and the preservation of Ukrainian cultural values. Canadian-Ukrainian scholar Volodymyr Krasnoholovets argues its themes remain relevant, as modern democratic systems often demand conformity, limiting personal freedom.

== Translations ==
Star Corsair has been translated into 26 languages, including French in 1985 as La Confrérie Étoilée and Russian in 1991 as Zvyozdnyy Korsar.

== Impact on the Author's Life ==
Berdnyk named his daughter Hromovytsia after a character in Star Corsair, and his son Radan after a character in his novel Vohnesmih.

== Bibliography ==
=== Judge and Love Trilogy ===
- Berdnyk, O. Interstellar Nanny. Sci-fi story // Komsomolskoye Znamya. 1961. September 20–26. (in Russian)
- Berdnyk, O. Interstellar Nanny // Berdnyk, O. Martian "Hares". Kyiv: Ditvydav, 1962. pp. 3–27.
- Berdnyk, O. Interstellar Nanny (story, trans. St. Borin, illus. Y. Yutsevych) // Berdnyk, O. Interstellar Nanny. Author's collection. Yekaterinburg: Tardis Publishing, 2014. pp. 107–128. (in Russian)
- Berdnyk, O. Last Judgment. Sci-fi novella / Illus.: V. Kryzhanivsky, A. Misitsky // Lyudyna i Svit. 1965. No. 2. pp. 49–55.
- Berdnyk, O. Last Judgment. Sci-fi novella / Illus.: V. Kryzhanivsky, A. Misitsky // Lyudyna i Svit. 1965. No. 3. pp. 43–50.
- Berdnyk, O. Rebellion of the Cosmocrats. Novella from the fairy tale "Judge and Love" / Illus.: M. Dakhno // Ranok. 1968. No. 5. pp. 17–20.

=== Editions of Star Corsair in Ukrainian ===
- Berdnyk, O. UR: Excerpts from a Fantastic Novella // Moloda Hvardiya. 1971. April 18–28.
- Berdnyk, O. Star Corsair. Kyiv: Raduga, 1971. 376 pp.
- Berdnyk, O. Star Corsair. Toronto: Dobra Knyzhka Publishing, 1981. 264 pp. (Dobra Knyzhka Series, No. 216).
- Berdnyk, O. Star Corsair // Berdnyk, O. Fiery Rider. Kyiv: Molod, 1989. pp. 55–366.
- Berdnyk, O. Rings of the Serpent (Part 1) // Berdnyk, O. Dazhboh's Tuning Fork. Kyiv: Ukrainian Writer, 1996. pp. 4–280.
- Berdnyk, O. Star Corsair // Berdnyk, O. Star Corsair. Kyiv: Triada-A — Afons VD, 2004. pp. 9–368.
- Berdnyk, O. Star Corsair // Berdnyk, O. Selected Works. Kyiv: Knyha, 2007. pp. 15–329.
- Berdnyk, O. Star Corsair // Berdnyk, O. Star Corsair. Paths of Titans. Kharkiv: Investor Publishing House, 2009. pp. 7–362.
- Berdnyk, O. Star Corsair. Lviv: Terra Incognita Publishing, 2019. 376 pp.

=== Other Languages ===
- Berdnyk, O. Le Papyrus noir, La révolte des cosmocrates [excerpts] // Berdnyk, O. La Confrérie Étoilée. P.I.U.F. Paris — Fides Montréal, 1985. pp. 39–68. (in French)
- Berdnyk, O. Zvyozdnyy Korsar. Moscow: Soviet Writer, 1991. 382 pp. ISBN 5-265-02022-5. (in Russian)
- Berdnyk, O. Zvyozdnyy Korsar. Kyiv: Afons Publishing House, 2005. 352 pp. ISBN 966-8731-04-2. (in Russian)
- Berdnyk, O. On Life, Death, and Love… [excerpts] // Fandango 6. Simferopol: TO "KaFKa" (Crimean Fantasts Club), 2009. pp. 137–141. (in Russian)

== Sources ==
- Berdnyk, Oles (2007). "Star Corsair". Selected Works. Kyiv: Knyha. pp. 16–329. ISBN 978-966-8314-37-7.
