= Yuriy Smolych =

Ukrainian writer, actor and public figure

Yuriy Smolych Hero of Socialist Labour
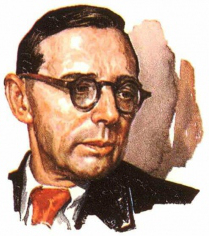
- Born: July 8, 1904; Uman, Russian Empire (today Cherkasy Oblast, Ukraine)
- Died: August 16, 1976 (aged 76); Kiev, Ukrainian SSR, Soviet Union
- Occupations: writer, actor, public figure
- Writing career
- Language: Ukrainian
- Notable awards: Hero of Socialist Labour
- Literary movement: Executed Renaissance, Socialist Realism

Yuriy Korniyovych Smolych (Ukrainian: Юрій Корнійович Смолич), born Heorhiy Korneliyovych Smolych (Ukrainian: Георгій Корнелійович Смолич, 8 July (O.S. 25 June) 1900 - 16 August 1976) was a Ukrainian Soviet writer and public activist known as a pioneer of Ukrainian science fiction.

== Biography ==
Smolych's father was a nobleman of Litvin origin and stemmed from the outskirts of Kovno (now Kaunas, Lithuania). After finishing Moscow University, he made a career as a mathematics and physics teacher and eventually settled in Ukraine. The future writer's mother, Olena Adamivna Stashynska, gave birth to three children, with Yura, as he was known in the family, being the youngest. Born in Uman, the boy attended gymnasiums in Kamianets-Podilskyi and Zhmerynka. Yuriy's childhood hobby was football, and he spent 10 years playing in a school team, despite being short-sighted. At the age of 18 he moved to Kyiv and entered the local Commercial institute. It was during his student time in Kyiv that Smolych learnt the Ukrainian language.

During the Ukrainian War of Independence Smolych volunteered to the front and served as a frontline medic. After the end of the war he found employment as an actor, and in 1922 started working at the Ivan Franko National Academic Drama Theater in Kyiv. In 1923 Smolych moved to Kharkiv, where he was appointed a theatre inspector. It was in Kharkiv that he started his career as a writer, joining literary societies Hart and VAPLITE. His first collection of stories saw the light in 1924. Smolych's first novel Last Agewood (1926) laid the foundations of Ukrainian science fiction and was followed by a trilogy Beautiful Disasters (1929–1934). From the late 1920s he was also active in the genre of satire. Together with Maik Yohansen Smolych became one of the creators of the "Technical-artistic Group A".

After Smolych's novels False Melpomene (1928) and At the Opposite Side of the Heart (1930) were designated by Soviet authorities as "nationalistic", the author became an object of attention from the NKVD. In early 1935 he was brought to the police headquarters in Kharkiv and agreed to work as an informer for the Soviet regime under codename Strila ("arrow"). Appointed head of the regional filial of the Writers' Union of Ukraine, Smolych provided authorities with personal data and characteristics on most prominent members of the organization. In the late 1930s he created an autobiographic trilogy dedicated to the time of his youth during the era of wars and revolutions.

During WW2 and in postwar years Smolych created a number of short stories and novels dedicated to topics of war and revolution, which served as political pamphlets criticizing the Ukrainian People's Republic and other enemies of the Soviet Union. His other autobiographic trilogy dedicated to the literary scene of Kharkiv during the Interwar Era was published in 1968–1970, but encountered criticism from authorities and was eventually banned. For his activities in countering the Ukrainian diaspora, in 1970 Smolych was awarded the title Hero of Socialist Labour.

== Personal life ==
During his time as actor at the Ivan Franko Theatre in the early 1920s Smolych married a fellow actress Ada Skuratova, who was six years older. After some time they divorced, but continued to live together. Around 1940 Smolych had an affair with Ukrainian writer Iryna Vilde. After Ada's death in 1953 he married for a second time with actress Olena Belza, who herself had had an affair with writer Leonid Pervomayskiy. Neither of Smolych's wives knew about his co-operation with Soviet security services.
