= World of Today =

- Regular Cover

Studio album by Supermax
- Released: 1977
- Recorded: May–September 1977
- Genre: Space disco, Eurodisco
- Length: 35:34
- Label: Atlantic (Germany)
- Producer: Peter Hauke

Supermax chronology
Don't Stop the Music (1977)	World of Today (1977)	Fly with Me (1979)

World of Today is the second album released by Supermax. It was released in 1977 and included the track "Lovemachine", which charted in Germany (#4), Switzerland (peaked at #6), Austria (#9), and the U.S. (#96).

== Track listing ==
1. World of Today (4:21) (Howell, Hauenstein)
2. Lovemachine (8:37) (Hauenstein)
3. Reality (5:12) (Hauenstein)
4. Musicexpress (3:42) (Hauenstein)
5. Camillo (3:17) (Hauenstein)
6. Be What You Are (2:56) (Schönherz)
7. I Wanna Be Free (7:15) (Hauenstein)

== Personnel ==
- Cynthia Arrich: Vocals
- Tebles Reynolds: Vocals
- Juanita Schulz: Vocals
- Rainer Marz: Lead & Rhythm Guitars, Backing Vocals
- Richard Schönherz: Keyboards, Synthesizers
- Kurt Hauenstein: Bass, Keyboards, Lead & Backing Vocals
- Hartmut Pfannmuller: Drums
- Brad Howell: Drums, Percussion, Backing Vocals
- Jurgen Zoeller: Percussion
- Daniel Ford: Percussion
- Peter Koch: Percussion

== Production ==
- Produced By Peter Hauke
- Recorded & Engineered By Fred Schreier, Jochen Wenke
- Assistant Engineer: Armin Bannach
- Mastered By Chris Bruggeman
