= Vasyl Berezhnyi =

Ukrainian Soviet science fiction writer and journalist (1918–1988)

- Native name: Василь Павлович Бережний
- Born: June 26, 1918 Bakhmach, Chernihiv Oblast, Ukraine
- Died: March 19, 1988 (aged 69) Kyiv, Ukraine
- Occupation: Science fiction writer; Journalist
- Language: Ukrainian
- Notable awards: Order of the Patriotic War, 2nd Class

Vasyl Pavlovych Berezhnyi (June 26, 1918 – March 19, 1988) was a Ukrainian Soviet science fiction writer and journalist.

== Biography ==
Vasyl Berezhnyi was born on June 26, 1918, in the village of Bakhmach, Chernihiv Oblast, Ukraine. In 1937, he graduated from the Ukrainian Journalism Technical School in Kharkiv and worked at the editorial offices of the newspapers Prapor Komuny in Bakhmach and Molodyi Komunar in Chernihiv. In 1938, he published his first science fiction short story, "The Planet Will Live" (Ukrainian: Планета житиме).

During World War II, Berezhnoy served in the tank forces, actively participating in combat operations and sustaining severe injuries. After the war and his demobilization, he worked for the newspapers Molod Ukrainy and the magazines Dnipro, Vitchyzna, and Ukraina. In 1948, he published his first book, a collection of documentary essays titled At the Helm (Ukrainian: За кермом). In 1952, he graduated from Kyiv University named after Taras Shevchenko. He later published several essay collections, including Pages of Life (Ukrainian: Сторінки життя, 1952) and Ships Launched from the Slipways (Ukrainian: Кораблі сходять зі стапелів, 1959), as well as the novellas Green Sea (Ukrainian: Зелене море, 1955) and Thorny Thorn (Ukrainian: Колюче терня, 1966). Berezhnoy also translated novels by Afanasiy Koptelov, and plays by Nikolai Pogodin and Anatoly Sofronov from Russian into Ukrainian.

Berezhnyi gained the most recognition for his science fiction works. His debut science fiction book, To the Stellar Worlds (Ukrainian: В зоряні світи), was published in 1956 and reprinted in 1958, a rare occurrence for the time. In total, Berezhnoy wrote around 15 science fiction novellas and over 50 short stories, published in about a dozen authorial collections in Ukrainian. His works were translated into English, Hungarian, Spanish, Latvian, Moldovan, Polish, Russian, Slovak, and French.

Berezhnyi participated in the First World Symposium of Science Fiction Writers, held in Tokyo in 1970 as part of the Expo '70 international exhibition, and the Third European Science Fiction Congress in Poland in 1976.

He died on March 19, 1988, in Kyiv and was buried at Baikove Cemetery.

== Selected bibliography (Russian-language publications) ==
=== Standalone editions ===
- To the Stellar Worlds: A Science Fiction Novella. Simferopol: Krymizdat, 1958.
- Sensation on Mars: Science Fiction Novellas and Short Stories. Authorized translation from Ukrainian by Alexander Tverskoy; Illustrated by Petr Karachentsov. Moscow: Soviet Writer, 1988. ISBN 5-265-00105-0.
  - Novellas
    - Archeoscript
    - Under the Ice Shield
    - Younger Brother of the Sun
    - Cosmic Gulf Stream
    - Sakura
    - Truth Nearby
    - To the Golden Dawn
    - Architectural Fantasy
    - Labyrinth
  - Short Stories
    - Interplanetary Tornado
    - Ephemeris of Love
    - Legend of Happiness
    - Mystery of the House of Eternity
    - Noosphere Phenomenon
    - Air Lens
    - In Cosmic Obscurity
    - Chronotone Niagara
    - Sensation on Mars
    - Chumkhab's Long Journey
    - Solar Saga
    - Voice of the Mother
    - Life's Relay
    - Children of One Sun
    - Formula of the Cosmos
    - Gifts of Shambala
    - Mysterious Nova
    - Pendulum Man
    - Ivan the Wise's Graviantenna
    - By Trolleybus to Khreshchatyk
    - Oh, Those Telepaths!
    - Vera-Verunya

=== Periodical and anthology publications ===
- "What the Glass Eye Didn't See: A Science Fiction Short Story". Translated from Ukrainian. Pioneriya (Kyiv), 1958, No. 9.
- To the Stellar Worlds: [Novella]. Translated from Ukrainian; Illustrated by B. Arzhekaev. Adventures and Science Fiction. Simferopol: Krymizdat, 1958.
- "Return of the Galaxy: A Science Fiction Short Story". Translated from Ukrainian. Pioneriya (Kyiv), 1959, No. 2.
- "Blue Planet: A Science Fiction Short Story". Illustrated by E. Skuinya. Science and Technology, 1961, No. 10.
- "Voice of the Mother: [Short Story]". Translated from Ukrainian by A. Roskopyta. Science Fiction-78. Moscow: Molodaya Gvardiya, 1978.
