= Salvation (GuGabriel song) =

Single by GuGabriel
- Released: July 7, 2012
- Recorded: 2011
- Genre: Pop
- Length: 3:23
- Label: GoodRunRecords
- Songwriter(s): Robert Osterberger, Paul Zawilensky

GuGabriel singles chronology
| "Poor Little Joé" (2011) | "Salvation" (2012) |

"Salvation" is a song by Austrian singer, songwriter and musician GuGabriel. The song was released in Austria as a digital download on July 7, 2012. The song has peaked to number 19 on the Austrian Singles Chart.

== Music video ==
A music video to accompany the release of "Salvation" was first released onto YouTube on July 7, 2012 at a total length of three minutes and forty-nine seconds. The video was produced by Tom Hoša & Bernhard Nicolics-Jahn.

== Track listing ==
Digital download

1. "Salvation" - 3:23

== Chart performance ==
| Chart (2012) | Peak position |
|---|---|
| Austria (Ö3 Austria Top 40) | 19 |

== Release history ==
| Region | Date | Format | Label |
|---|---|---|---|
| Austria | July 7, 2012 | Digital Download | GoodRunRecords |
