= Supermax (band) =

Austrian musical project

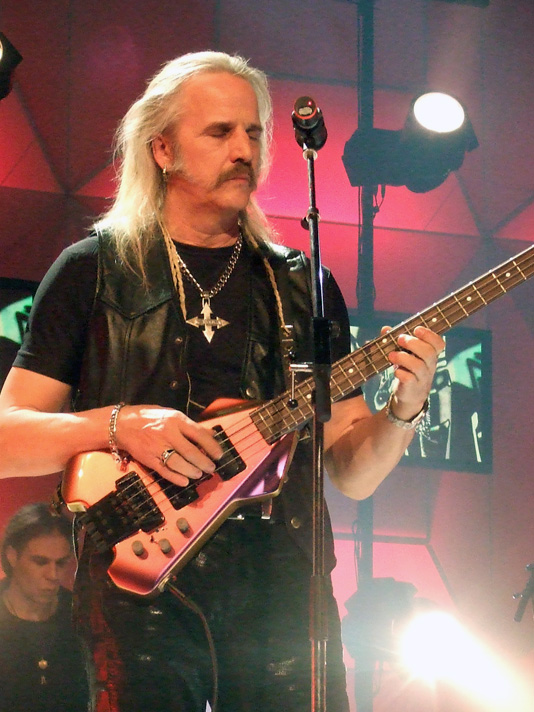

Background information
- Origin: Frankfurt am Main
- Genres: Reggae; funk; disco; rock
- Years active: 1975–2011
- Labels: CBS; Universal; Ariola; WEA; Venus Records
- Website: supermax.cc

Supermax was a project of Austrian musician and producer Kurt Hauenstein (1949–2011), best known for the 1979 hit "It Ain't Easy", and "Lovemachine", a 1977 German #4 single, that peaked at #6 in Switzerland, #9 in Austria and #96 in US.

The first members of the band were Kurt Hauenstein (Mini Moog, vocals), Hans Ochs (guitar), Ken Taylor (bass guitar), Lothar Krell (keyboards), Peter Koch (percussion), Jürgen Zöller (drums) and the singers Cee Cee Cobb and Jean Graham. After Ken Taylor left the band in 1979, Kurt Hauenstein returned to his original music instrument, the bass guitar. Later, Bernadet Onore Eben and Jessica Hauenstein, the daughter of Kurt Hauenstein, joined the group as backing vocal singers. From 2006 Raimund Bretterbauer joined as his Sound Engineer and Co Producer.

In 1981, Supermax toured as the first mixed-race band through South Africa for 21 gigs. Despite warnings and death threats, Supermax finished the tour, but this made some countries refuse permits for entry, and consequently the group was black-listed by some political organizations.

In 1983, Supermax was invited to play as special guest from Europe at the Reggae Sunsplash Festival in Montego Bay, Jamaica.

== Discography ==
- 1976: Don't Stop the Music
- 1977: Lovemachine
- 1977: World of Today
- 1979: Fly with Me
- 1980: Types of Skin
- 1981: Meets the Almighty
- 1983: Electricity
- 1986: Something in My Heart
- 1988: Just Before the Nightmare
- 1990: World of Tomorrow – Hansa
- 1992: Tha Max Is Gonna Kick Ya
- 1993: One and All
- 1995: 3 Club-CDs: Spirits of Love, Living in a World, Magnetic Rhythm
- 1997: Supermax – 20th Anniversary
- 1998: "YAKU" Total Immigration
- 2001: Terminal 2002
- 2007: Remaxed Vol. 1
- 2007: Remaxed Vol. 2
- 2008: Supermax – Best Of
- 2009: ЗЕМЛЯНЕ & SUPERMAX
