= Salvation (UK band) =

English post-punk band

Salvation are an English post-punk goth band formed in Leeds, West Yorkshire, in 1983. They released several EPs, singles, and albums. Their first EP was Girlsoul (1983), and their most recent album is We Gave You Diamonds... Live at De Casino in 2021, recorded live on tour in March 2020, when they supported the Mission in Belgium.

== History ==
Salvation are associated with the original Leeds-based goth scene of the 1980s. They released their first EP titled Girlsoul on Merciful Release, the Sisters of Mercy's label in 1983. This was followed by a second release, a three-track 12" single titled "Jessica's Crime", produced by the Mission's Wayne Hussey on the Batfish label in 1985. It comprised three tracks: "Jessica's Crime", "The Shining", and "Shattered Sky".

In the following years, the band brought out a number of independent records which all reached the UK Indie top 20. The Complete Collection: 1985-1989 compilation album was issued by Cherry Red Records in 2005.

In the early 1990s, Salvation signed to Miles Copeland's IRS label and released the SASS album. Salvation toured extensively with the Alarm, Fields of the Nephilim, New Model Army and the Wonderstuff.

In March 2020, the band played four shows supporting the Mission in France and Belgium. The last show was recorded and released on both CD and vinyl titled We Gave You Diamonds... Live at De Casino! on the Timeslip label.

== Discography ==
=== Albums ===
Year	Title	Record label	Chart positions	
Year	Title	Record label	UK Indie Chart	U.S. Pop Albums Chart
1985	Clash of Dreams	Merciful Release		
1987	Diamonds Are Forever	Ediesta	13	
1990	Sass	IRS Records		
1997	Hunger Days	Timeslip		
2005	The Complete Collection	Cherry Red Records		
2021	We Gave You Diamonds... Live at De Casino	Timeslip		

=== EPs and singles ===
Year	Title	Record label	Chart positions	
Year	Title	Record label	UK Indie Chart	US Modern Rock
1983	Girlsoul	Merciful Release	24	
1985	"Jessica's Crime"	Batfish Inc.	16	
1986	Seek EP	Ediesta	16	
1988	"Sunshine Superman"	Karbon	12	
1989	"All and More"	Karbon	18	
1990	"(Clearing Out The) Debris"	IRS Records		

== Members ==
- Daniel Mass
- James Elmore
- Choque Hosein
- Paul Maher
- Mike Hayes
- Richard Miechje
- Benoît Farvak
- Andrew Mills
- Adam Clarkson
- George Schultz
- Paul Lavender
- Stuart Owen
- Nic Bate
- Andy Holmes
- Mark Crawshaw
- Owen Llewelyn Richards
