= Freistadt =

- Municipality
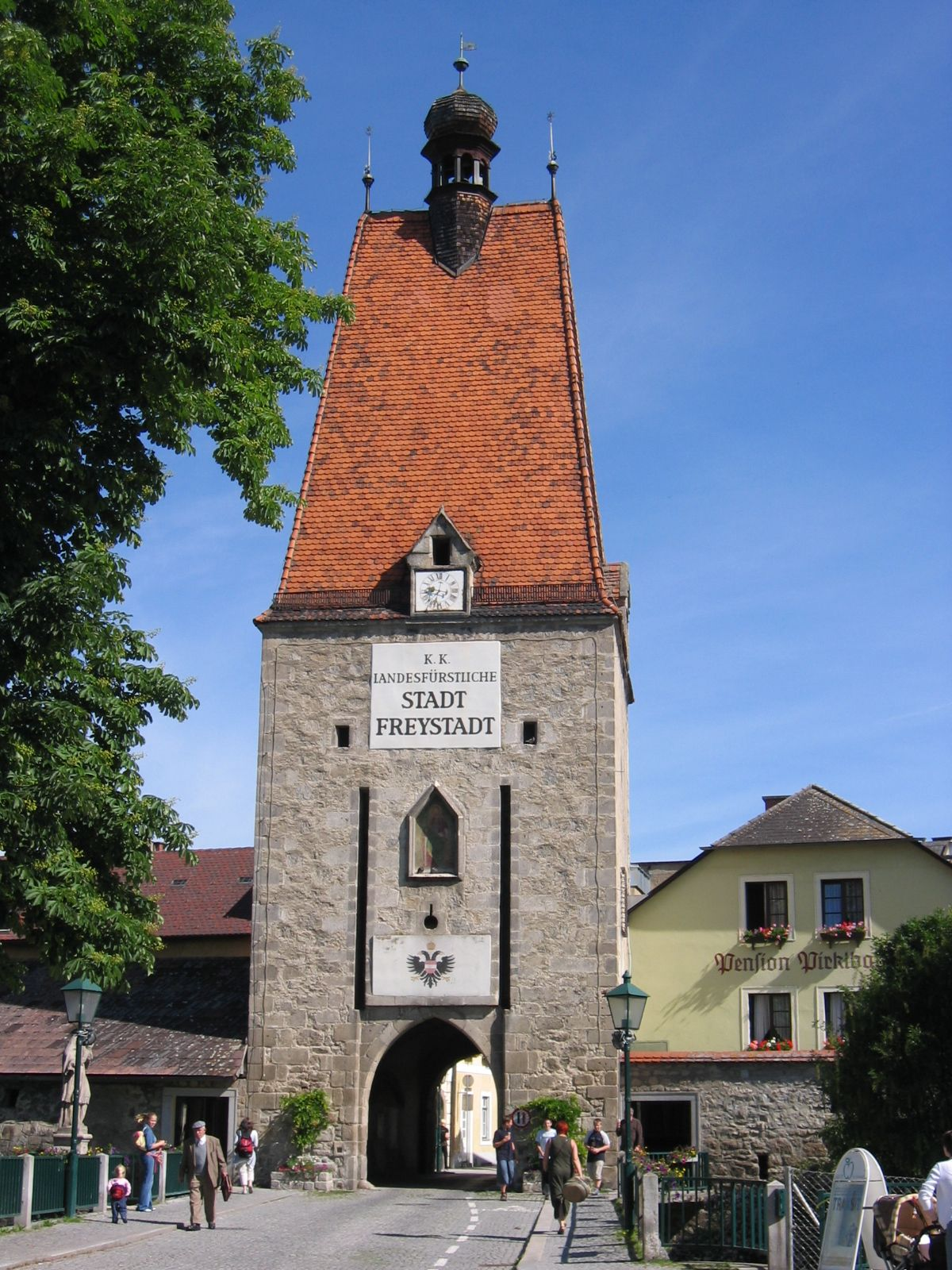
- Linz gate

- Coat of arms

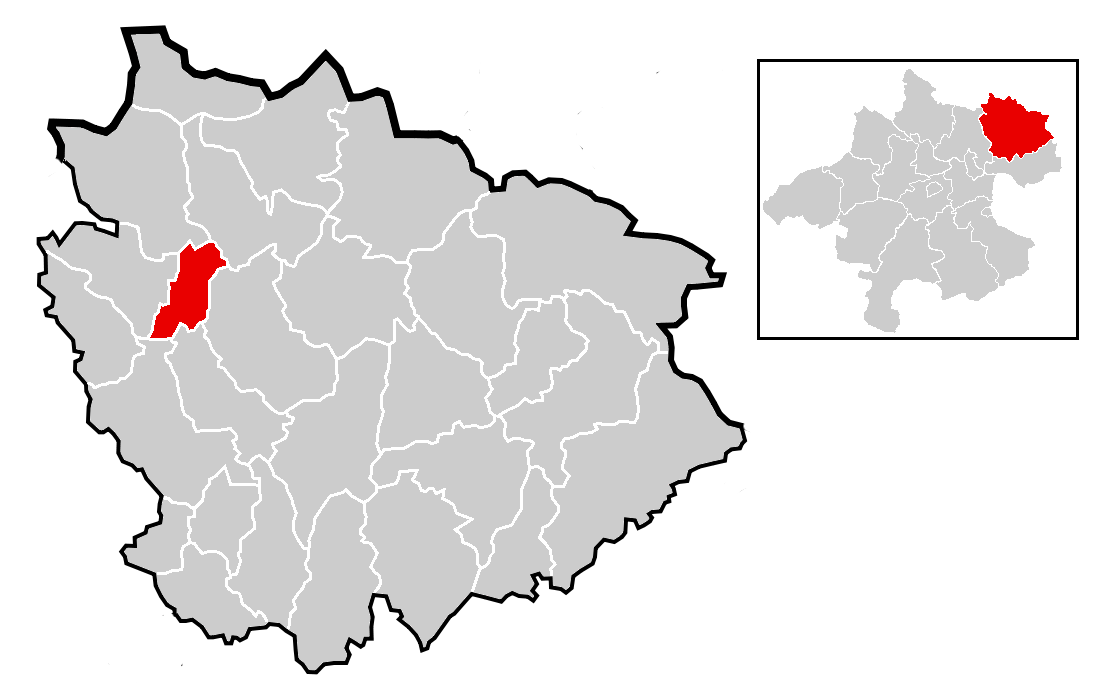
- Location within Freistadt district

- Location of Freistadt within Austria Location of Freistadt within Upper Austria
- Coordinates: 48°30′41.25″N 14°30′18.72″E
- Country: Austria
- State: Upper Austria
- District: Freistadt

Government
  - Mayor: Christian Gratzl (SPÖ)

Area
  - Total: 12.88 km^{2} (4.97 sq mi)
- Elevation: 560 m (1,840 ft)

Population (2018-01-01)
  - Total: 7,909
  - Density: 614.1/km^{2} (1,590/sq mi)
- Time zone: UTC+1 (CET)
  - Summer (DST): UTC+2 (CEST)
- Postal code: 4240
- Area code: 07942
- Vehicle registration: FR
- Website: www.freistadt.at

Freistadt (Austrian German pronunciation: [ˈfraɪʃtat], lit. 'Freetown') is a small Austrian town in the state of Upper Austria in the region Mühlviertel. With a population of approximately 7,500 residents, it is a trade centre for local villages. Freistadt is the economic centre of a district of the same name District Freistadt. The nearest sizeable cities are Linz, the capital of Upper Austria, about 40 km in the south, and České Budějovice, the capital of Southern Bohemia, about 60 km in the north.

== History ==
The area surrounding Freistadt came under the dominion of the Bavarian Duchy in the seventh century.

Freistadt was founded before 1220. The Babenberg Duke Leopold VI passed through the area in 1225. The earliest mention of Frienstat is in a document from 1241, but in 1277, Rudolf von Habsburg referred to Vreinstat in another document. Its position separated the Habsburg and Bohemian lands, and it stood at crossroads of the valuable salt and iron trade route, which had operated from prehistoric times through the Middle Ages. The outer and inner walls, towers and gates of the old city, built mainly between 1363 and 1393, still exist today.

Freistadt suffered French incursions in 1805 and 1809, during the Napoleonic Wars. Since 1918, Freistadt has been part of Bundesland Upper Austria. Following the Anschluss with Germany on 13 March 1938, the locality was part of Gau Oberdonau but in 1945 was restored to Bundesland Upper Austria.

=== Notgeld ===
Like many municipalities of Upper Austria, Freistadt issued Notgeld for collectors in 1920.

== Demographics ==
Historical population
Year	Pop.	±%
1869	3,253	—
1880	3,471	+6.7%
1890	3,361	−3.2%
1900	3,800	+13.1%
1910	3,988	+4.9%
1923	3,954	−0.9%
1934	3,992	+1.0%
1939	4,903	+22.8%
1951	5,136	+4.8%
1961	5,375	+4.7%
1971	5,963	+10.9%
1981	6,251	+4.8%
1991	6,251	+0.0%
2001	7,353	+17.6%
2011	7,482	+1.8%

== Politics ==
The municipal council (Gemeinderat) consists of 37 members. Following the 2021 Upper Austrian Local Elections, the seat distribution is as follows:

- Austrian People's Party (ÖVP): 13 seats
- Social Democratic Party of Austria (SPÖ): 10 seats
- Freedom Party of Austria (FPÖ): 5 seats
- The Greens - The Green Alternative (GRÜNE): 5 seats
- We for Freistadt (WIFF): 4 seats

The mayor of Freistadt, Christian Gratzl (SPÖ), was elected in 2021.

== Tourism ==
The main entrance to the Old Town is through the Linzer Tor (Linz Gate). The spacious Hauptplatz (main square) is surrounded by painted fronts of renovated burghers' houses. On the highest point of Freistadt stands the parish church of St Catherine (14th-15th century, remodelled in Baroque style in 1690 and rebuilt in Gothic style in 1967); note in particular the interlaced ribbed vaulting in the roof of the choir. At the northeastern corner of the square a gateway leads to the 14th century Schloss Freistadt, with a 50m/165 ft high keep which now houses the Mühlviertler Schlossmuseum, a local museum with a large collection of verre églomisé (glass decorated with a layer of engraved gold). Outside the Böhmertor (Bohemian Gate) stands the little 15th century Liebfrauenkirche with beautiful "pillars of light" of 1484.

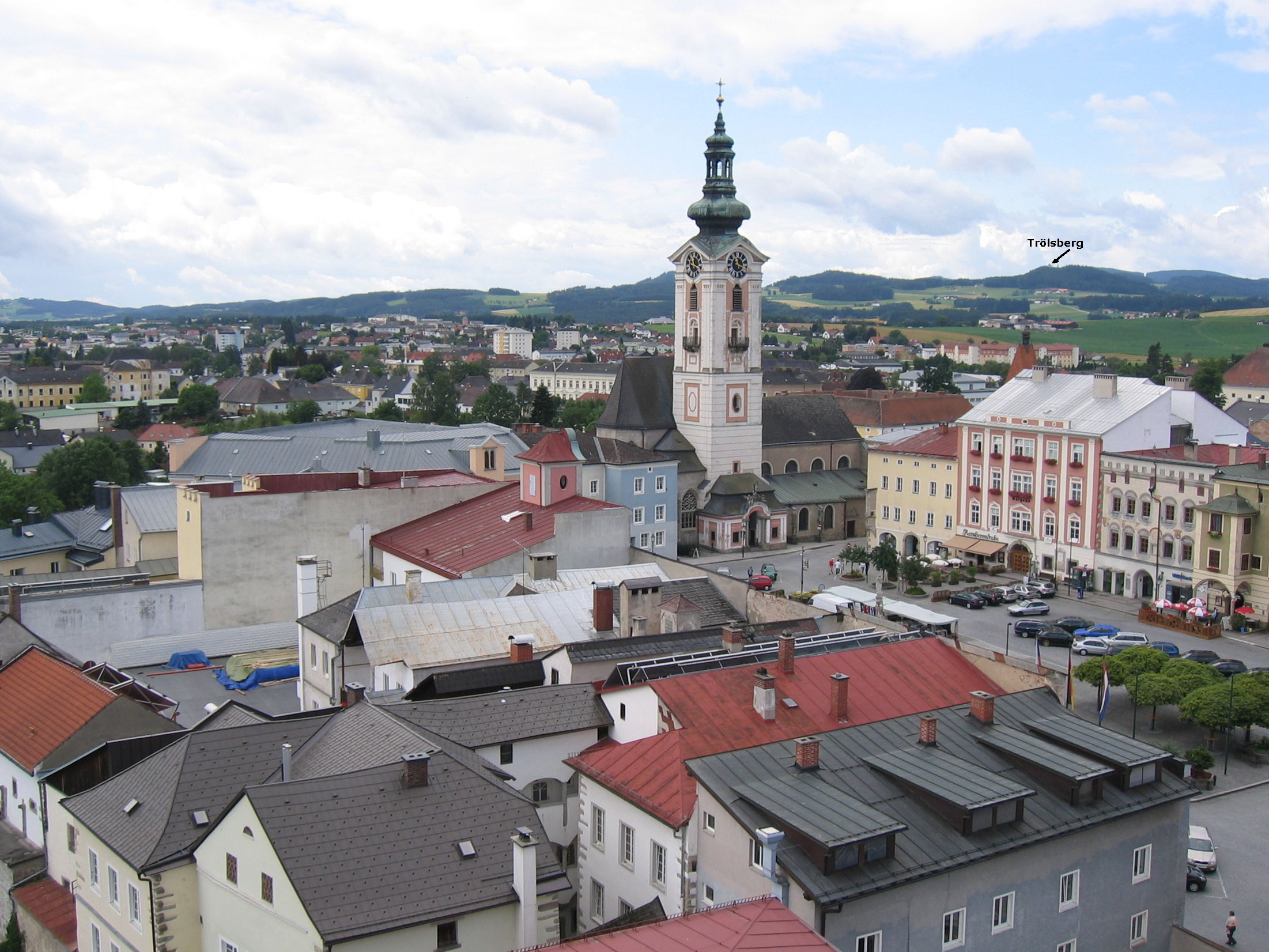
The town seen from the Bergfried (Castle)

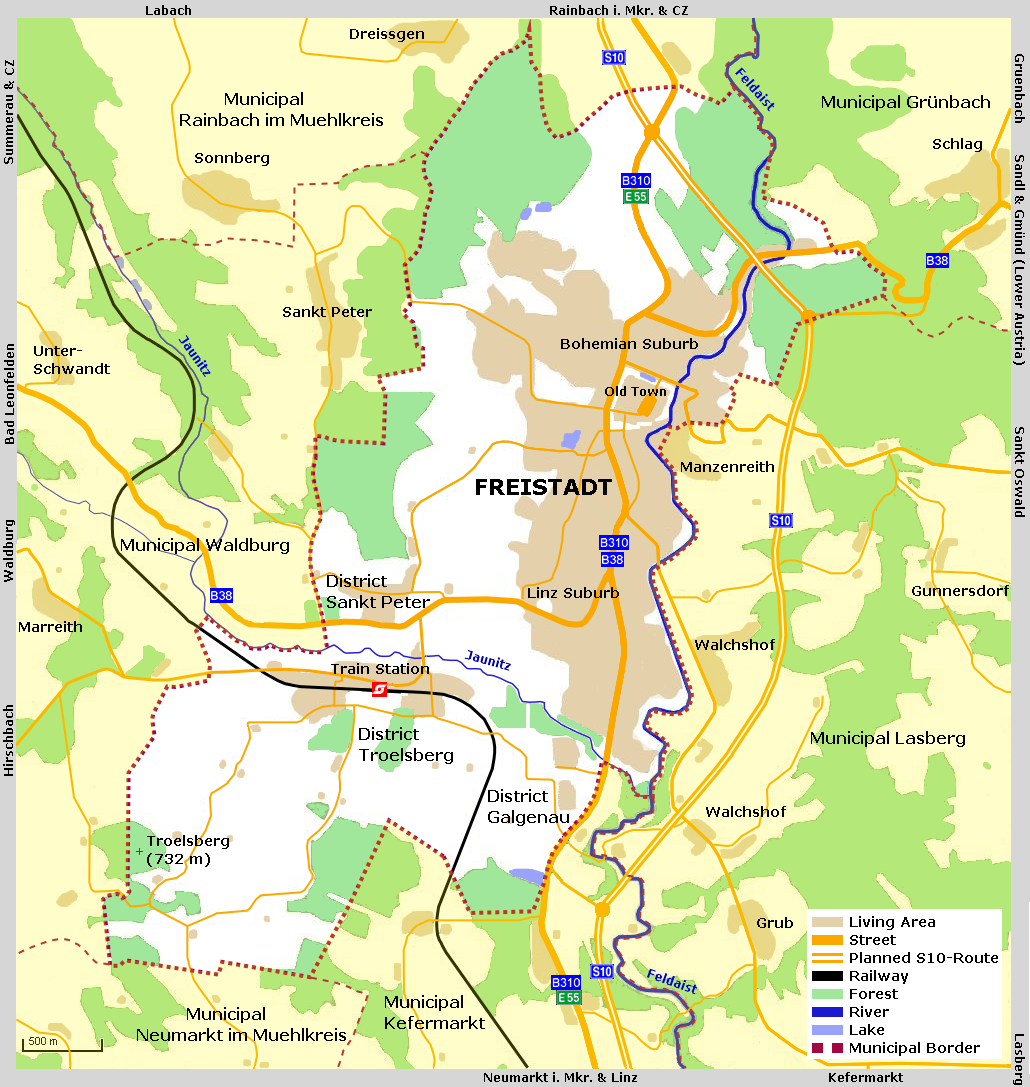
Area Map

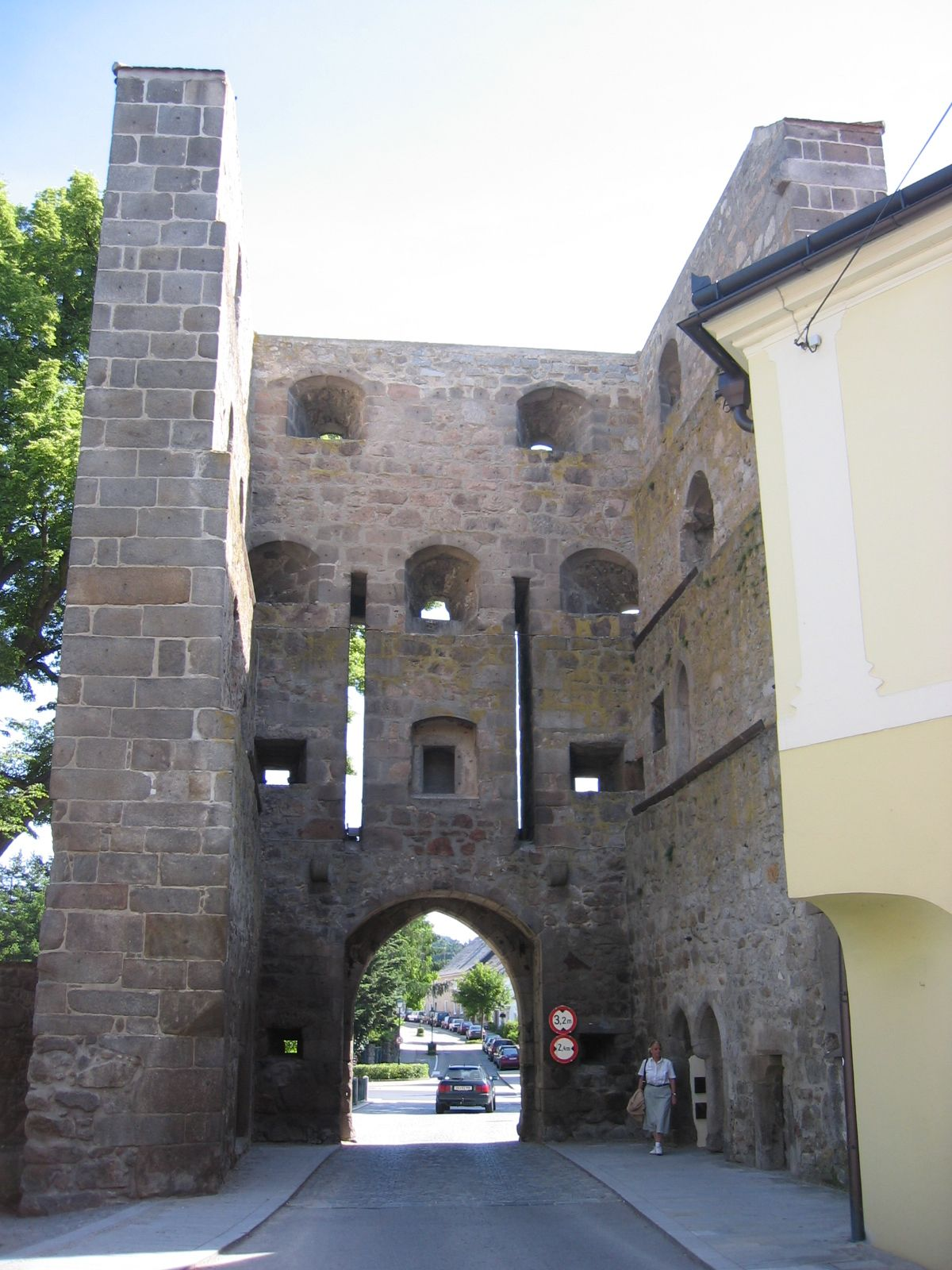
Bohemian Gate (Böhmertor) from the inner side

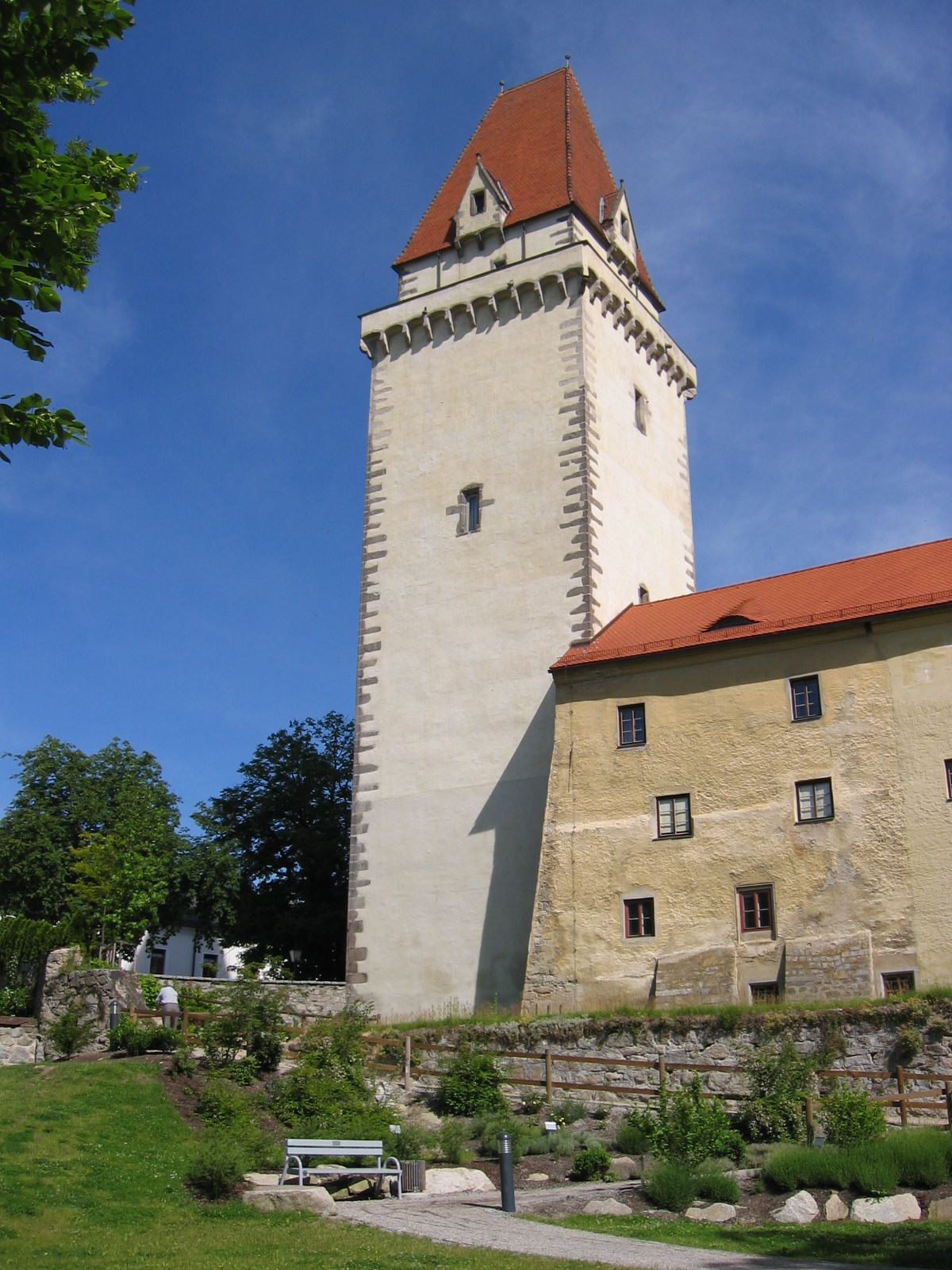
Bergfried of the Castle

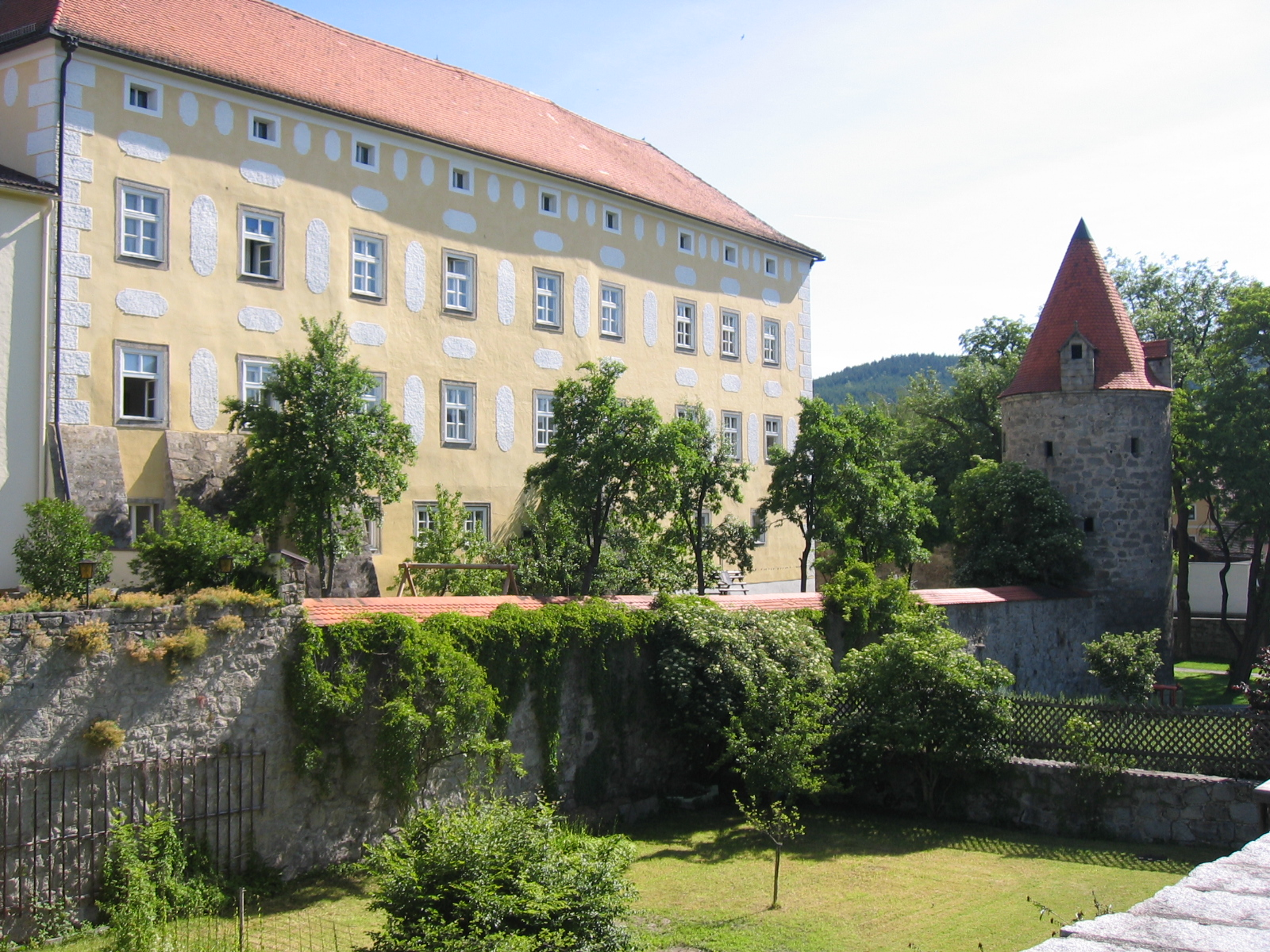
Dechanthof Tower (and Dechantyard)

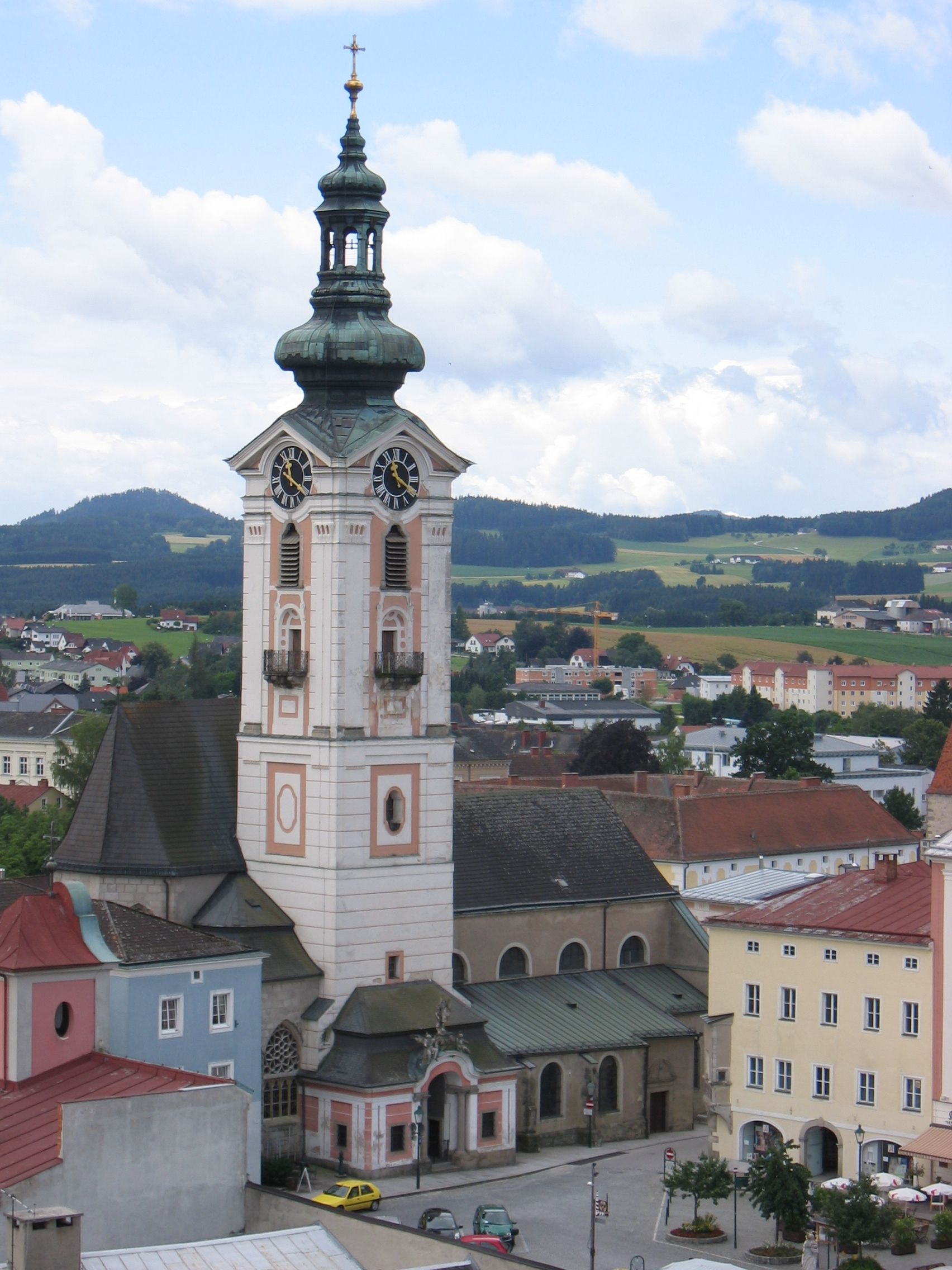
Parish Church of St Catherine

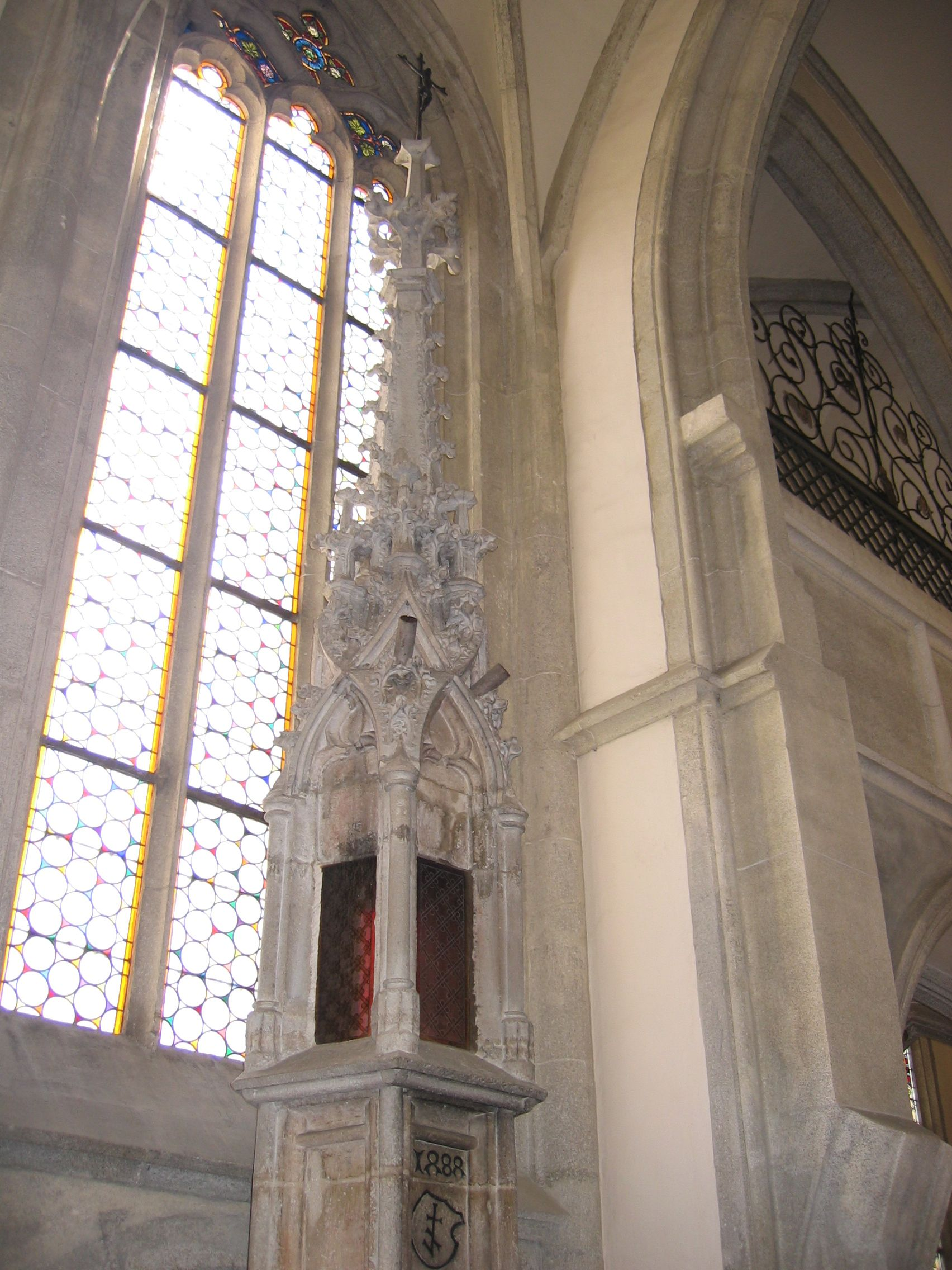
Pillars of Light from 1484

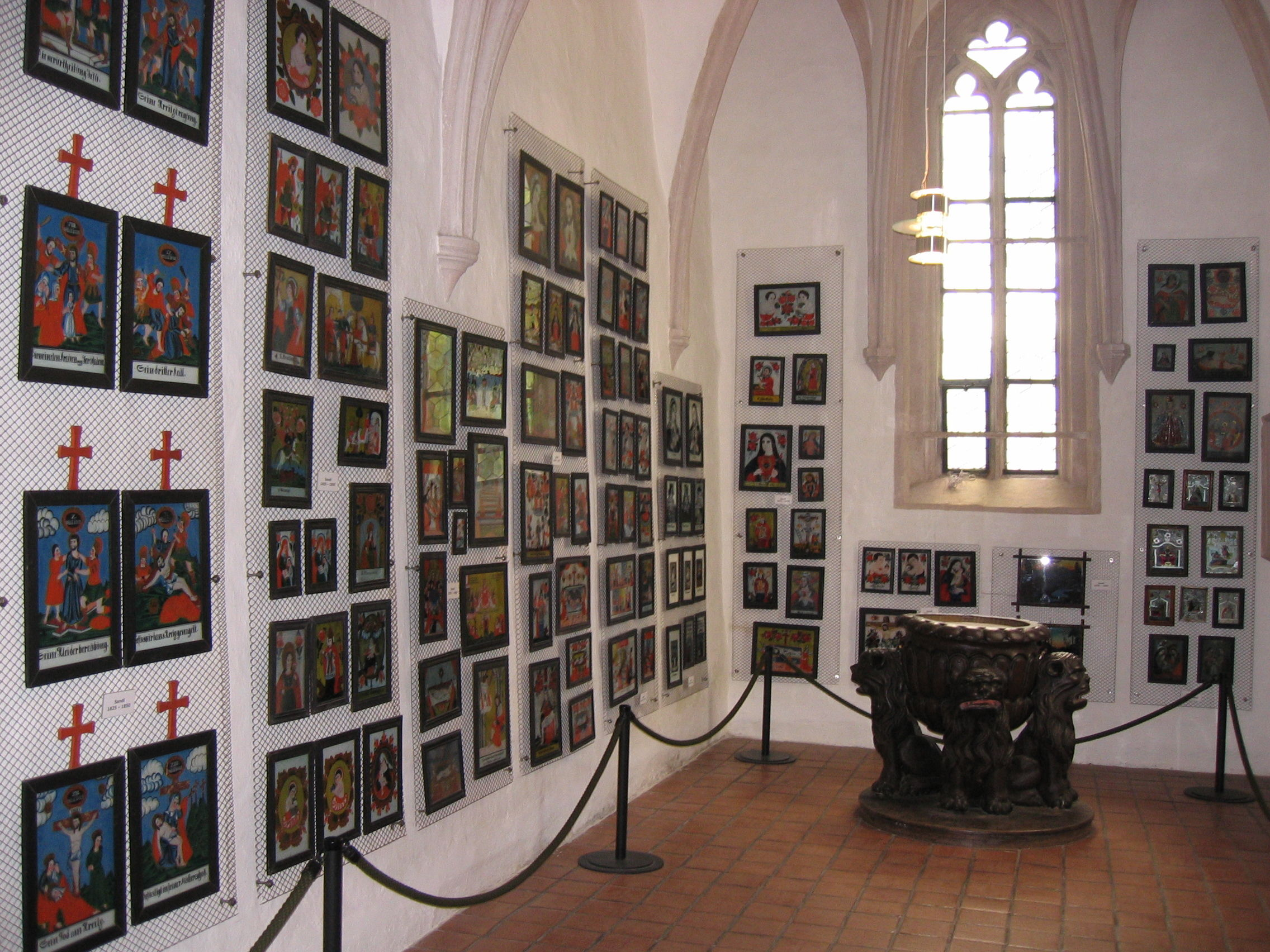
Verre églomisé from the Museum

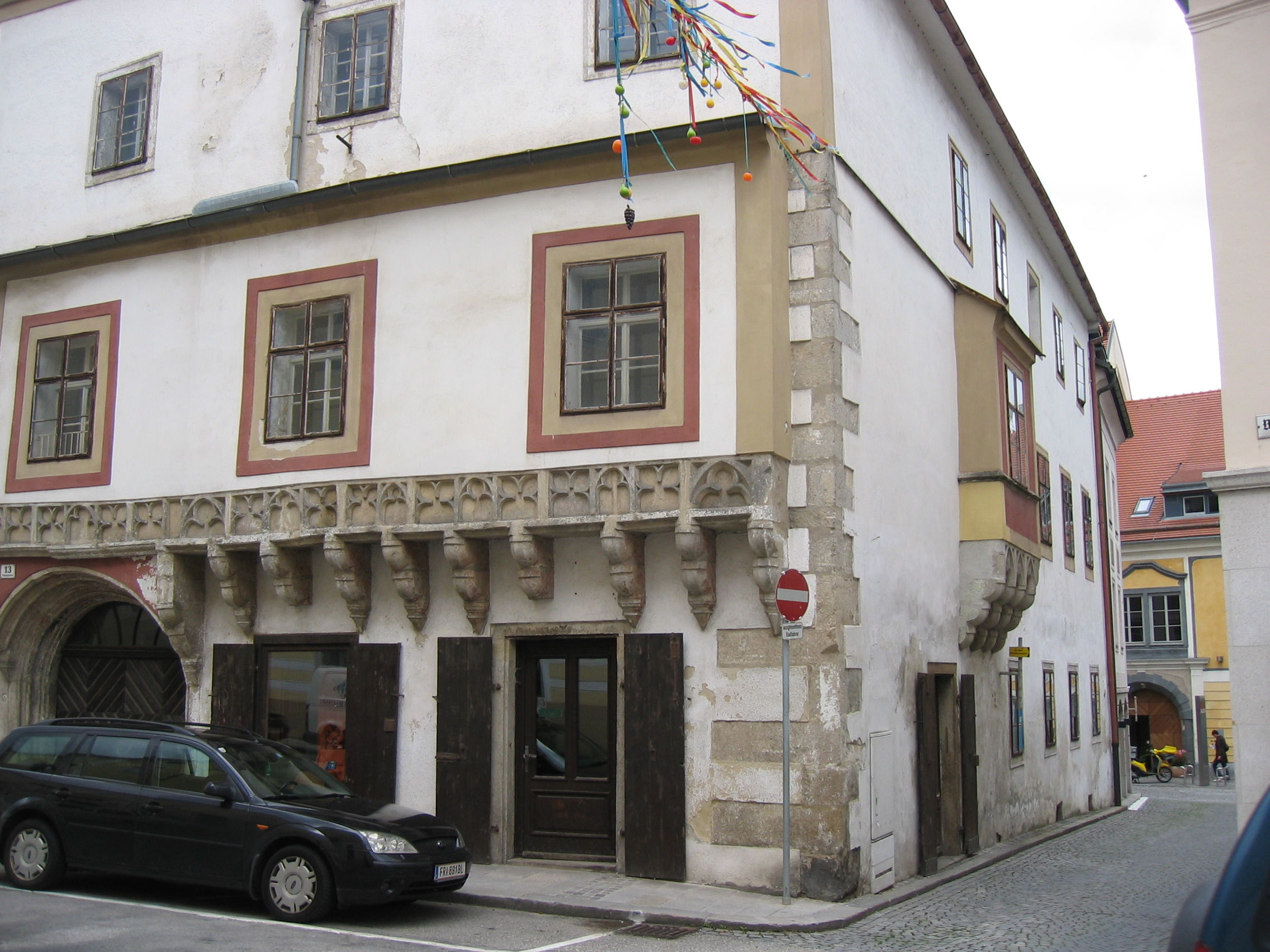
Burghers' House near the main square
