= Zynoviia Franko =

Ukrainian writer and linguist (1925–1991)

- Зиновія Ростислава Тарасівна Франко
- Born: Zynoviia Rostyslava Tarasivna Franko; 31 October 1925; Lwów, Poland (now Lviv, Ukraine)
- Died: 17 November 1991 (aged 66); Kyiv, Ukraine
- Education: University of Lviv
- Occupations: Linguist; literary historian; publicist
- Spouse: Pavlo Yurachkivskyi (m. 1950)
- Writing career
- Subject: Ivan Franko

Zynoviia Rostyslava Tarasivna Franko (Note: Also written as Zinoviia (Зіновія) or Zenoviia (Зеновія).) (Ukrainian: Зино́вія Ростислава Тарасівна Франко́; 31 October 1925 – 17 November 1991) was a Ukrainian writer, linguist, literary historian, and Soviet dissident. A member of the Franko family, her works primarily concerned the writings of Ivan Franko, her grandfather.

== Early life and literary activities ==
Franko was born in the city of Lviv (then known as Lwów and part of the Second Polish Republic) on 31 October 1925 to Kateryna and Taras Franko. Via her father, she was the granddaughter of poet and writer Ivan Franko. She studied at the Lviv Academic Gymnasium and the Stanislaviv Gymnasium, graduating from the latter shortly before Soviet troops recaptured the city in 1944. In contrast to other members of her family, like the executed Petro Franko, Zynoviia was treated particularly well by the Soviet government.

Franko graduated from the University of Lviv in 1949, and completed postgraduate studies at the Potebnia Institute of Linguistics. She became a candidate of sciences in 1954, and from 1956 was a senior academic at the institute.

== Dissident activities ==
Franko was fired from her position as a senior academic at the institute in 1969 after she republished Ivan Dziuba's samvydav publication Internationalism or Russification?. She also came under constant surveillance by the KGB and was expelled from the Communist Party of the Soviet Union. Franko did not support Viacheslav Chornovil's Civic Committee for the Defence of Nina Strokata, believing that it was pointless to fight for a single individual and that it would be better to subordinate the group under the Committee on Human Rights in the USSR of Andrei Sakharov.

Franko was arrested amidst the 1972–1973 Ukrainian purge alongside Mykhailyna Kotsiubynska, a descendant of Mykhailo Kotsiubynsky. She was subject to interrogation intended to bring her to renounce the dissidents and publicly repent. She eventually conceded, and published an article in Pravda denouncing dissidents. During Chornovil's trial she guessed that he had been the editor of The Ukrainian Herald.

Franko was returned to her position at the institute in 1972, where she remained until retiring in 1987. Over the course of her career she wrote more than 250 articles relating to the study of Ivan Franko's works. She actively supported the 1989–1991 Ukrainian revolution, participating in the restoration of the Shevchenko Scientific Society, the Revolution on Granite, the foundation of the People's Movement of Ukraine, and the revitalisation of the Ukrainian Greek Catholic Church.

== Personal life and death ==
Franko married Pavlo Yurkachkivskyi (1920–2015), a physicist and a graduate of the University of Lviv. They had two sons; Yurii (1951–2024) and Andrii (born 1958). She died on 17 November 1991 in the Ukrainian capital of Kyiv.
