= Pavlo Skochok =

Ukrainian Soviet dissident and journalist (1935–2013)

- Павло Скочок
- Born: 5 May 1935; Ostriv, Ukrainian SSR, Soviet Union (now Ukraine)
- Died: 12 January 2013 (aged 77); Kyiv, Ukraine
- Education: Taras Shevchenko State University of Kyiv (expelled)
- Political party: Ukrainian Helsinki Union

Pavlo Ivanovych Skochok (Ukrainian: Павло Іванович Скочок; 5 May 1935 – 12 January 2013) was a Ukrainian Soviet dissident and journalist.

== Biography ==
Pavlo Ivanovych Skochok was born on 5 May 1935 in the village of Ostriv, Kyiv Oblast, in what was then the Soviet Union. He studied at Taras Shevchenko State University of Kyiv, although he was expelled due to alleged "nationalist views". He subsequently worked as an editor for the Soviet Ukraine newspaper until April 1966, when he was fired for criticising the paper's ideology, as well as for publishing the transcripts of trials of the 1965–1966 Ukrainian purge as samvydav. Skochok was assisted in the creation of his samvydav by Viacheslav Chornovil and Liudmyla Sheremet, who would both later become dissidents in their own right. After being fired from Soviet Ukraine, Skochok worked as a proofreader.

On 12 January 1978 Skochok was arrested and charged with anti-Soviet agitation. Found to be insane by the court, he was sent to an asylum in Kyiv, later being moved to Dnipropetrovsk. There, he was subject to political abuse of psychiatry before being released in 1982. During his imprisonment, he was regarded as a prisoner of conscience by international human rights group Amnesty International. He briefly studied the Symyrenko family while working at the Levko Symyrenko Museum in Mliiv before being fired. He protested his firing in 1985, demanding to be allowed abroad to collect documents about the family from France. In 1987, alongside Chornovil, Skochok began to write for The Ukrainian Herald, an independent newspaper.

Skochok was a member of both the Ukrainian Culturological Club and the Ukrainian Helsinki Union. Following the 1989–1991 Ukrainian revolution, Skochok distanced himself from Chornovil, whom he had previously supported, instead backing Oleksandr Moroz and the Socialist Party of Ukraine. He was one of several to back Moroz in an effort to prevent Ukraine from aligning with the West or Russia, alongside Stepan Khmara, Mykola Horbal, and Vasyl Barladianu. Around this same time, he also co-founded the Golden Gate journal, alongside Ukrainian National Assembly – Ukrainian People's Self-Defence member Anatolii Lupynis.

Between 1992 and 1995, Skochok supported the establishment of a Ukrainian monarchy under Oleksii Dolhorukov, the grandson of Ukrainian State general Oleksii Dolhorukov and a member of the House of Anjou-Durazzo. Dolhorukov was part of an extreme fringe movement which claimed that the monarchy of "Ukraine-Rus" had been established in Khust in 1938, under Oleksii's adopted father. Dolhorukov lived in Madrid, and claimed the title of "Olelko II". Skochok's backing of the movement made little impact on its support in Ukraine, and he soon turned to writing condemnations of the Ukrainian government as illegal in Golden Gate.

Skochok died on 12 January 2013, according to fellow dissident Vasyl Ovsienko. He died in Kyiv, Ukraine's capital. His death came one day before that of Mykhailo Horyn, and seven before that of Congress of Ukrainian Nationalists politician and Ukrainian Insurgent Army veteran Mykhailo Zelenchuk.
