= Mykhailo Kosiv =

Ukrainian journalist, Soviet dissident, and politician

- Михайло Косів
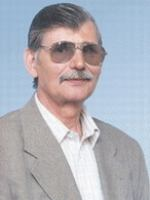
- Official portrait, 2007

People's Deputy of Ukraine
- In office 23 November 2007 – 12 December 2012
- Constituency: Yulia Tymoshenko Bloc, No. 126
- In office 15 May 1990 – 25 May 2006
- Preceded by: Constituency established (1990, 1998)
- Succeeded by: Constituency abolished (1998); Taras Chornovil (2002)
- Constituency: Lviv Oblast, Pustomyty (1990–1998); Lviv Oblast, No. 116 (1998–2002); Our Ukraine Bloc, No. 65 (2002–2006)

Personal details
- Born: 28 December 1934 (age 91) Olchówka, Poland (now Vilkhivka, Ukraine)
- Party: Reforms and Order Party
- Other political affiliations: People's Movement of Ukraine (until 2002); Our Ukraine Bloc (2002–2005); Pora-PRP Civic Bloc; Yulia Tymoshenko Bloc (2007–2012)
- Education: University of Lviv

Mykhailo Vasyliovych Kosiv (Ukrainian: Михайло Васильович Косів; born 28 December 1934) is a Ukrainian journalist, Soviet dissident, and politician who served as a People's Deputy of Ukraine from 1990 to 2006 and from 2007 to 2012. Previously, he was a journalist for The Ukrainian Herald, an independent newspaper in the Ukrainian Soviet Socialist Republic.

== Early life and dissident activities ==
Mykhailo Vasyliovych Kosiv was born to peasants Vasyl Stepanovych and Yulia Mykolaivna Kosiv on 28 December 1934 in the village of Olchówka, in the southern Stanisławów Voivodeship of the Second Polish Republic. Today, the village is known as Vilkhivka, and it is located in Ukraine's western Ivano-Frankivsk Oblast. He studied philology at the University of Lviv from 1955 to 1960, and conducted post-graduate studies at the university's history of the Ukrainian language department. His candidate of sciences thesis, "Science, journalism and fiction in the creative tradition of I. Franko", was sent to rectors, but he was arrested before he was able to defend it.

Several intellectuals from Kyiv, the Ukrainian capital, came to the city of Lviv in 1962. Among them were poets Ivan Drach, Mykola Vinhranovskyi, and Dmytro Pavlychko, literary critic Ivan Dziuba, as well as an unsuccessful attempt by Les Tanyuk and Alla Horska to perform Mykola Kulish's comedic play This is How the Goose Died. These events both agitated Lviv's young intelligentsia, leading Kosiv to found an equivalent to Kyiv's Artistic Youths' Club. Many young members of the club, including Bohdan and Mykhailo Horyn, Ivan Gel, and Mykhaylo Osadchy, would later go on to become Soviet dissidents. The club organised cultural events, such as a play based on the Taras Shevchenko poem Haidamaky. It took on a more ideological character than its Kyiv equivalent, arguing for the restoration of an independent Ukrainian state rather than human rights concerns.

Kosiv was arrested on 27 September 1965 as part of the 1965–1966 Ukrainian purge and charged with anti-Soviet agitation. On 6 March 1966 he was released on the basis of illness and a lack of evidence against him, and he began working as a teacher. He started working at the Lviv History Museum in 1969, where he remained until 1989. From 1970 to 1972 he was one of the three members of the editorial staff of The Ukrainian Herald, alongside Viacheslav Chornovil and Yaroslav Kendzior. As a result, the Soviet government deprived him of the right to publish his own works for 15 years.

== Political career ==
=== People's Deputy of Ukraine ===
With the beginning of the 1989–1991 Ukrainian revolution Kosiv returned to political life. He co-founded the Taras Shevchenko Society of the Ukrainian Language and the People's Movement of Ukraine (Rukh), and actively participated in efforts to revive the Ukrainian Greek Catholic Church. He was elected as a People's Deputy of Ukraine from Rukh during the 1990 Ukrainian Supreme Soviet election, and was a member of the state sovereignty, inter-republic relations, and international relations committees. During the 1991 Soviet coup attempt, Kosiv was part of a delegation of Ukrainian deputies that published documents on behalf of the Lviv Oblast Council denouncing the coup attempt (along with Kendzior, Chornovil, Roman Ivanychuk, and Stepan Davymukha). Kosiv was also a member of Chornovil's campaign staff during the 1991 Ukrainian presidential election.

Kosiv was re-elected in 1994, 1998, and 2002. Following the 1999 split in Rukh, he maintained his membership in the original iteration of the party until May 2001, when he joined the Reforms and Order Party. From 1994 to 2006 he was head of the Verkhovna Rada Cultural and Spiritual Committee.

Kosiv was a candidate for People's Deputy of Ukraine in the 2006 Ukrainian parliamentary election as a candidate of Pora-PRP Civic Bloc, although he was not successfully elected. He was re-elected during the 2007 Ukrainian parliamentary election as part of the Yulia Tymoshenko Bloc, and served as head of the Religious Subcommittee on the Cultural and Spiritual Committee.

=== Post-People's Deputy political activities ===
Since his retirement from the Verkhovna Rada, Kosiv has continued to take an active part in politics. Along with fellow politicians Kendzior, Volodymyr Parubii, and Oksana Yurynets, he spoke out against the Russian information war against Ukraine and created a programme to be aired on Suspilne Lviv regarding the information war before it was abruptly cancelled under unclear circumstances.

In 2024 Kosiv expressed opposition to President Volodymyr Zelenskyy retaining power amidst martial law in Ukraine and the Russian invasion, and referred to him ruling beyond the five-year term proscribed under non-martial law conditions as an "arbitrary seizure of power".
