= 1972–1973 Ukrainian purge =

1972–1973 purge of Ukrainian intelligentsia and society by the Communist Party

- Part of the Brezhnev era and the Russification of Ukraine
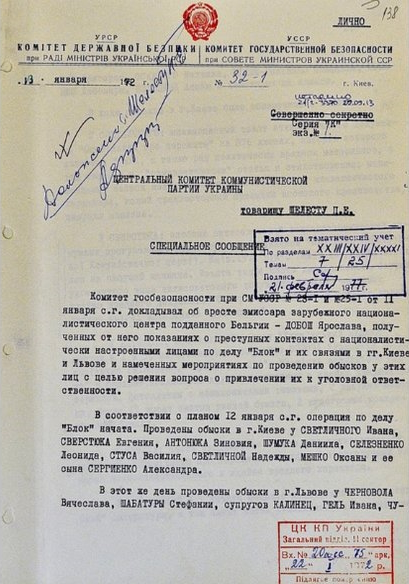
- Ukrainian KGB resolution signed by Petro Shelest confirming the start of Operation Bloc, 13 January 1972
- Date: 12 January 1972 – 1973
- Location: Ukrainian SSR, Soviet Union (primarily Kyiv and Lviv)
- Also known as: Operation Bloc
- Motive: Anti-Ukrainian sentiment, opposition to Ukrainian national expression
- Target: Ukrainian Soviet dissidents, Kharkiv Clan (Petro Shelest)
- Perpetrators: Dnipropetrovsk Mafia (Volodymyr Shcherbytsky, Leonid Brezhnev), KGB
- Outcome: Shelest removed from power; Most Ukrainian dissidents arrested; Ukrainian dissident movement pushed underground; Between 1.5% and nearly 5% of Communist Party of Ukraine members removed from the party
- Arrests: Disputed; 87 – "thousands"
- Convicted: 193

From 12 January 1972 to 1973, a wide-reaching purge of Ukrainian society and intelligentsia was organised by Leonid Brezhnev and the KGB. Codenamed Operation Bloc (Russian: Операция «Блок», romanized: Operatsiya «Blok»; Ukrainian: Операція «Блок», romanized: Operatsiia «Blok»), the purge resulted in the arrest of 193 people, including most of the leaders of the Ukrainian dissident movement, as well as the removal of Petro Shelest and the installation of Volodymyr Shcherbytsky as First Secretary of the Communist Party of Ukraine.

== Background ==
The 1965–1966 Ukrainian purge, aimed against the counter-culture Sixtiers, largely failed in its intention of bringing the Ukrainian dissident movement to submission. Instead, it resulted in the further politicisation of Ukrainian dissidents from their previous position of supporting greater self-expression into a movement for greater Ukrainian autonomy under the Soviet Union. Some of those arrested, such as Viacheslav Chornovil, had emerged as leading figures of the strengthened dissident movement since the purge.

Palace intrigues additionally drove the purge; Soviet leader Leonid Brezhnev's Dnipropetrovsk Mafia, a group of politicians from Dnipropetrovsk Oblast, was opposed to the Kharkiv Clan of Petro Shelest, the First Secretary of the Communist Party of Ukraine (as well as the smaller Donetsk Clan). Shelest's greater tolerance for Ukrainian national expression proved intolerable to Brezhnev, and moves began being made to dampen his authority. In 1970 Vitaly Fedorchuk left the central KGB apparatus to become its director in Ukraine.

=== Prelude ===
Between 1967 and 1971, 87 people in the Ukrainian SSR had been condemned for production and spread of "anti-Soviet literature". Increase in such activities alarmed the republican KGB leadership. Based on a previous report by the security service, on 27 July 1971 Central Committee of the Communist Party of Ukraine adopted a motion aimed at stopping the spread of "politically damaging materials". Around the same time, KGB started developing the plan of Operation Bloc in order to implement that decision. Following a meeting of KGB leadership with heads of republican security organs in Moscow in November 1971, KGB of the Ukrainian SSR received an instruction to document dissident activities in order to gather evidence and provide a base for criminal persecution of pro-democracy activists.

=== Dobosh affair ===
Prior to the execution of Operation Bloc, Belgian foreign student Yaroslav Dobosh, a member of the Organisation of Ukrainian Nationalists in exile, was dispatched at the recommendation of Omelian Koval and the blessing of cardinal Josyf Slipyj to the Soviet Union on a mission to acquire samvydav. This material was intended to later be released for open publication outside of the Eastern Bloc.

Dovbosh first travelled to the Ukrainian capital of Kyiv, where he met dissidents Zynoviia Franko, Ivan Svitlychnyi, and Leonid Selezenko, who gave him a roll of camera film containing photographs of Sviatoslav Karavanskyi's Dictionary of Rhymes in the Ukrainian Language and a copy of The Ukrainian Herald.

On 2 January 1972 Dobosh left Kyiv for the western Ukrainian city of Lviv. There, he met Stefania Hulyk-Hnatenko on the street and held a conversation with her. At this time, Dobosh was under constant surveillance by the KGB. His hotel room was bugged, and he was photographed several times during his time in the city. Two days later, he began travelling south, intending to cross over the border in Zakarpattia Oblast. The KGB, fearful that he would bring samvydav or military secrets over to the west, determined that it was necessary to intercept him.

Following a stop at the Chop border station that occurred smoothly, the train was again stopped after a kilometre, and Dobosh was taken by four individuals (two civilian and two military). Under the pretext that his visa had been incorrectly stamped, he was taken into detention. During his detention, eight rolls of film including Karavanskyi's Dictionary of Rhymes in the Ukrainian Language and photos of dissidents Vasyl Stus and Valentyn Moroz were found, in addition to books that KGB officers incorrectly believed to be samvydav (including a tourist brochure of Saint Andrew's Church in Kyiv). Under interrogation, Dobosh admitted his membership in the OUN and the Ukrainian Youth Association, as well as the fact that Koval had sent him to the Soviet Union. This provided the basis to execute Operation Bloc.

== Purge ==
On the eve of the purge, leading Ukrainian dissidents gathered in the Lviv flat of Olena Antoniv to hold a Vertep (nativity play) ceremony for the holiday of Koliada. The celebration quickly grew into a protest against Soviet state atheism. Those present were all arrested within the next three days; Vasyl Stus in Kyiv and Iryna Kalynets and Stefaniia Shabatura in Lviv. The arrests of Viacheslav Chornovil, Mykhaylo Osadchy, and Ivan Gel soon followed.

Simultaneously with those in Lviv, Koliada celebrations also took place in Kyiv. These had been discovered in advance by the KGB, which, fearing that the celebrations could grow to encompass several parts of the city, arrested the organisers between 12 and 14 January: Ivan Svitlychnyi, Yevhen Sverstiuk, Leonid Plyushch, Mykola Plakhotniuk, Zinovii Antoniuk, Oleksandr Serhiienko, and Ivan Kovalenko. On 13 January Shelest formally gave the order to begin Operation Bloc.

After three days, over 20 of Ukraine's leading dissidents had been arrested in the cities of Kyiv, Lviv, and Odesa. They would all eventually be sentenced to seven years of hard labour and between three and five years of exile. Dobosh was deported from the Soviet Union to Belgium, where he renounced the claims made during interrogation.

Ukrainian intelligentsia that had evaded arrest responded swiftly, and negatively, to the purge. Philosopher Vasyl Lisovyi wrote an open letter protesting the arrests, and was subsequently arrested himself. The authorities continued their purges by claiming that Ukrainian dissidents were nationalists in cahoots with the Zionist and refusenik movements, publishing widespread anti-Zionist propaganda during the early stages of the purges.

=== Shelest's removal ===
Shortly after the first arrests, the central party apparatus began to target the leadership of the Communist Party. A removal of Shelest as First Secretary was out of the question; he had broad support from the secretaries of all the oblasts of Ukraine aside from Donetsk (Volodymyr Dehtiariov), Dnipropetrovsk (Oleksiy Vatchenko), and Ivano-Frankivsk (Viktor Dobryk) oblasts. Further complicating matters, Shelest had the support of the leaders of other union republics, such as Ivan Bodiul of Moldavia or Vasil Mzhavanadze of Georgia.

The party called Shelest to Moscow to attend meetings of the Politburo of the Communist Party of the Soviet Union. There, he was subjected to constant pressure from other members for "narrow-mindedness" and being overly concerned with Ukrainians and told that he would become Deputy Premier. At the same meeting, Brezhnev told Chairman of the Council of Ministers of Ukraine Volodymyr Shcherbytsky, leader of the party opposition to Shelest, "get ready to be First Secretary." Following the meeting, Shelest told his advisers, "it's all over."

The public reason for Shelest's removal was initially stated to be health. Kremlinologists in the West initially believed that Shelest's hardline foreign policy positions, such as his opposition to a planned visit by U.S. President Richard Nixon, had caused his removal. However, public shaming of Shelest, such as a public attack by Shcherbytsky in April 1973 and a highly-critical review of Shelest's 1970 book O, Ukraine, Our Soviet Land that complained it would encourage Ukrainian nationalism, later made clear that Shelest's removal was part of a broader suppression of Ukrainian culture.

=== Escalation and party purge ===
Now First Secretary, Shcherbytsky dramatically increased the scope of the arrests, with thousands of detentions and searches according to historian James Mace (though this is disputed by Ukrainian historian Oleh Bazhan, who states that only 87 were arrested). Educational institutions were purged. He also launched a purge targeting members of the Communist Party of Ukraine. Shelest's rule had led to a significant increase in party membership, particularly in traditionally nationally conscious western Ukraine. Valentyn Malanchuk, formerly a party worker in Lviv Oblast, was appointed party secretary for ideology in December 1972. As a result of party purges conducted by Shcherbytsky and Malanchuk, at least 1.5% and as much as almost 5% of the party's total membership was purged by 1974. Members of the Kharkiv Clan distanced themselves from Shelest, publicly denouncing him, although they never regained their former strength.

== Effects ==
In his article published in the underground newspaper The Ukrainian Herald, Stepan Khmara characterized the KGB action as a "general pogrom". As a result of the purge, Ukraine's intelligentsia was fully forced underground. Even among those who were not arrested, an oppressive attitude and constant surveillance remained over them, and many were forced to either live in exile (such as Lina Kostenko, Mykhailyna Kotsiubynska, Valeriy Shevchuk, Les Tanyuk, and Pavlo Movchan) or publicly express support for the Soviet government (as was the case with Ivan Drach and Dmytro Pavlychko). Publication of samvydav, as well as the traditions of Koliady, were brought to a halt as a result of the purge. It would take until the late 1970s, with the emergence of the Ukrainian Helsinki Group, for the dissident movement to regain its strength.

Operation Bloc continued to exist following the purge itself as a psychological warfare campaign against dissidents. Individuals monitored were subject to constant surveillance, with efforts being made to establish a fear of informants among both those subject to imprisonment and those who avoided arrest.
