= Stefaniia Shabatura =

Ukrainian textile artist and human rights activist (1938–2014)

- Стефанія Шабатура
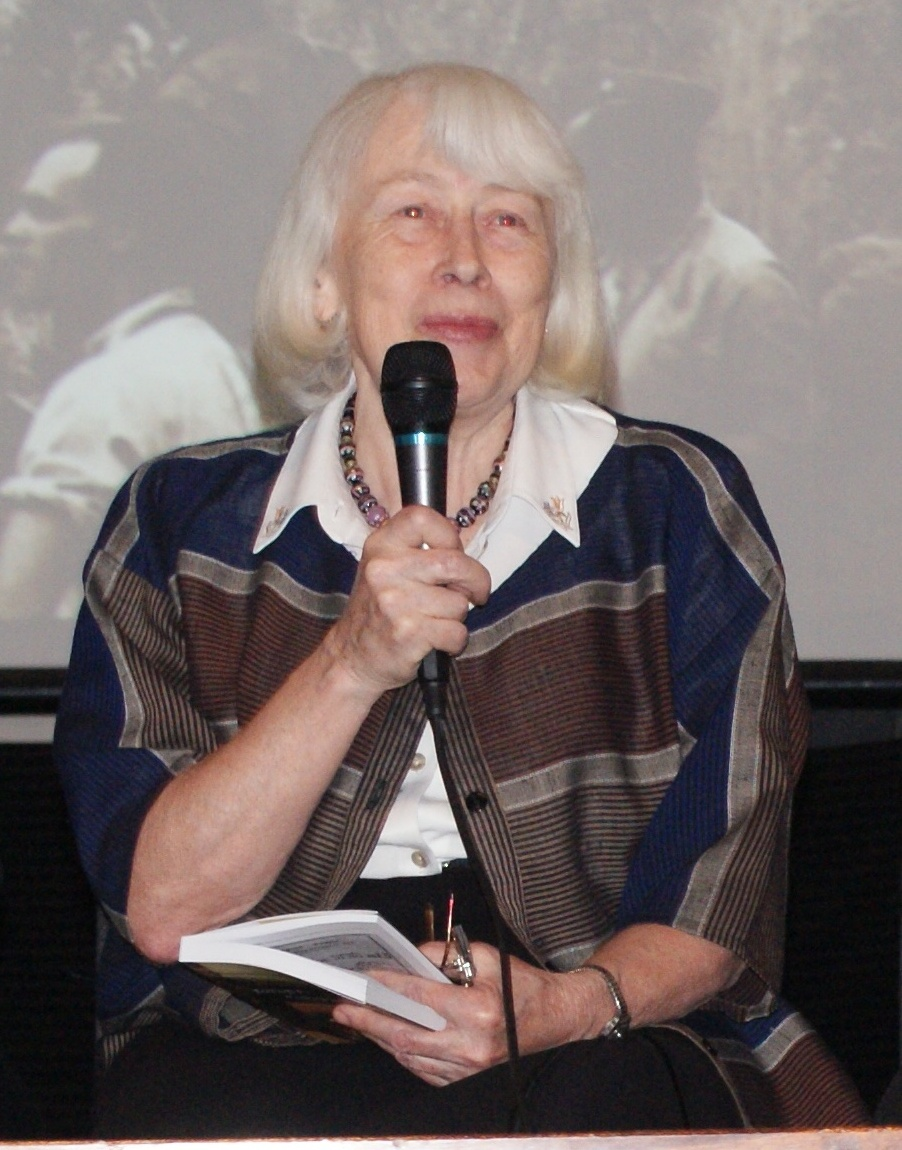
- Shabatura in 2011
- Born: 5 November 1938; Iwanie Złote, Poland (now Ivane-Zolote, Ukraine)
- Died: 17 December 2014 (aged 76); Lviv, Ukraine
- Education: Lviv Institute of Applied and Decorative Art
- Known for: Rugs, human rights activism
- Style: Kilim, tapestry

Stefaniia Mykhailivna Shabatura (Ukrainian: Стефа́нія Миха́йлівна Шабату́ра; 5 November 1938 – 17 December 2014) was a Ukrainian textile artist and human rights activist. First acquiring attention as a creator of tapestries and kilim rugs, she later became a member of the Ukrainian Helsinki Group and spent several years imprisoned on charges of anti-Soviet agitation.

== Early life and career ==
Stefaniia Mykhailivna Shabatura was born on 5 November 1938 in the village of Ivane-Zolote, then part of the Second Polish Republic. Her mother was Hanna Shabatura, a painter. Her father, Mykhailo Hnatovych Shabatura, was a soldier in the Polish and Red armies, dying during World War II. Shabatura stated that her family was likely Cossacks from eastern Ukraine based on their surname.

Shabatura graduated from art school in 1961, followed by the Lviv Institute of Applied and Decorative Art (now part of the Lviv National Academy of Arts) in 1967. Following her graduation, Shabatura's tapestries and kilim rugs were widely displayed at art exhibitions, and she acquired prominence. She was a member of Mykhailo Kosiv's Lviv branch of the Artistic Youths' Club, and printed samvydav. At this time, she became acquainted with other members of the growing Ukrainian dissident movement, such as Olena Antoniv and Bohdan Antkiv. She became a member of the National Union of Artists of Ukraine in 1969.

Shabatura's dissident activism began in 1970, following the arrest of Valentyn Moroz. She was part of a group of artists and writers that condemned Moroz's arrest and demanded to be allowed to observe the trial.

== Arrest ==
Shabatura was part of a group of Ukrainian intellectuals that participated in a Vertep ceremony on 12 January 1972 in protest against the Soviet government's religious policy. She was arrested at the event, alongside Viacheslav Chornovil, Ivan Gel, Iryna Kalynets, Mykhaylo Osadchy and Yaroslav Dashkevych. Charged with anti-Soviet agitation, Shabatura was sentenced to five years' imprisonment and six years of exile. She was interned at the women's penal colony ZhKh-385/3-4 in Barashevo, Tengushevsky District, in the Mordovian Autonomous Soviet Socialist Republic. Shabatura was recognised as a prisoner of conscience by international human rights non-governmental organisation Amnesty International by June 1975, and remained imprisoned in Mordovia until late 1975. During that time, she spent 115 days in solitary confinement and one and a half years in a chamber-type room.

In late 1975, Shabatura was moved from Mordovia to Lviv, where she remained imprisoned as part of a "re-education" programme. Shabatura declared a hunger strike, and in response 150 of her drawings were burned by the Soviet authorities. The burning of Shabatura's drawings sparked a brief period of unrest, and Shabatura was placed in a chamber-type room for six months for refusing to work. Shabatura launched another twelve-day hunger strike in April 1976. She was later exiled to the Tajik Soviet Socialist Republic from 1976 to 1979, and joined the Ukrainian Helsinki Group while in exile. She returned to Lviv on 2 December 1979, but was barred from displaying or selling her textiles and worked as a janitor.

== Later life and death ==
During the 1980s Shabatura joined Memorial's Lviv chapter and the People's Movement of Ukraine. She was active in efforts to revive the Ukrainian Greek Catholic Church, and served as head of the Marian Sisters of the church from 1991. Shabatura was a member of the Lviv City Council from 1990 to 1995, participating in the raising of the flag of Ukraine at Lviv Town Hall.

Shabatura was awarded the Order of Princess Olga by President of Ukraine Leonid Kuchma in 1999. She was later awarded the Order for Courage by President Viktor Yushchenko in 2006.

Shabatura died in Lviv on 17 December 2014. Her funeral was held at the Church of the Presentation in Lviv the following day, and she was buried at Lychakiv Cemetery.
