= Zorian Popadiuk =

Ukrainian human rights activist

- Зорян Попадюк
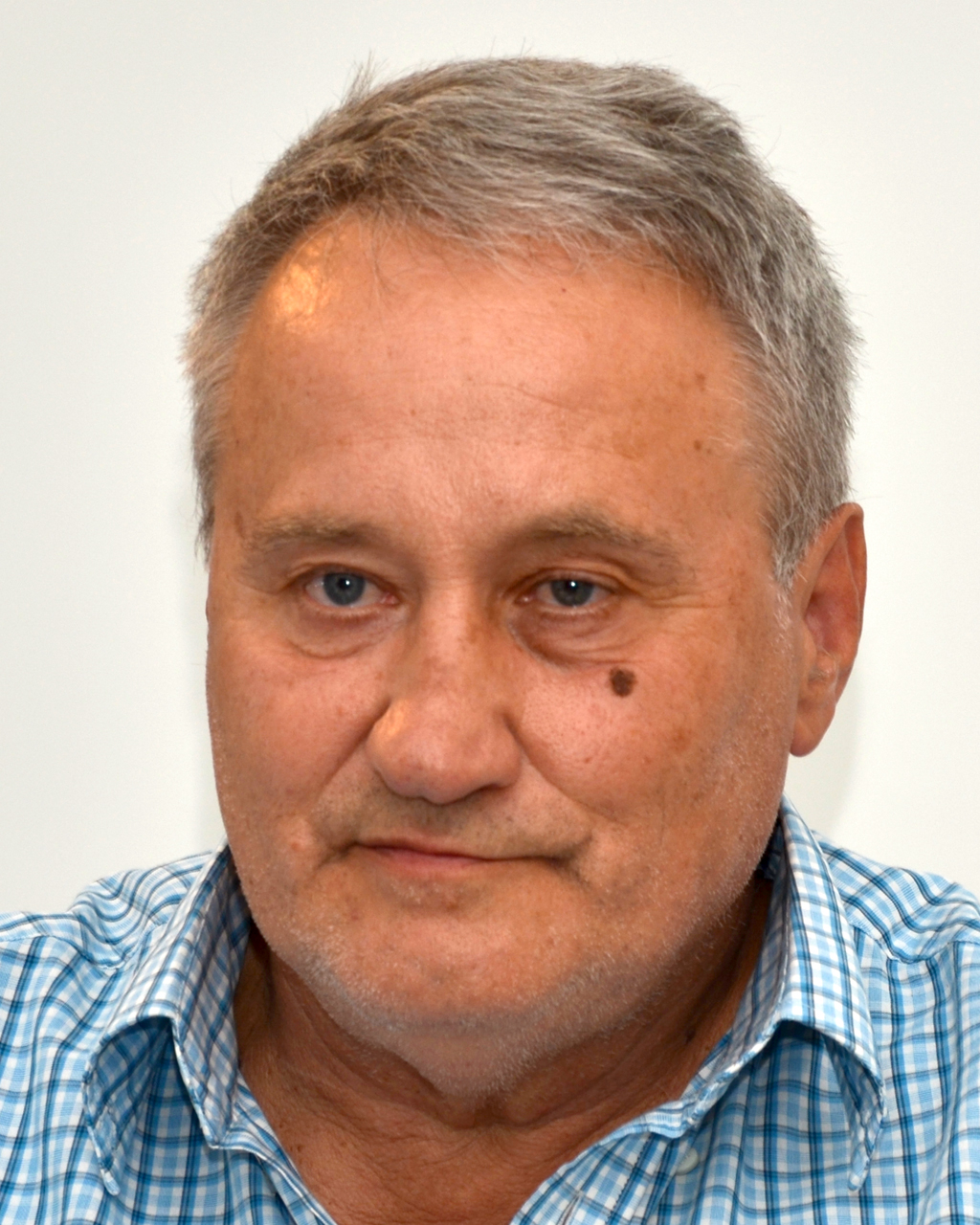
- Popadiuk in 2017
- Born: 21 April 1953 (age 72); Lviv, Ukrainian SSR, Soviet Union (now Ukraine)
- Occupation: Human rights activist
- Known for: Prisoner of conscience held by the Soviet Union

Zorian Volodymyrovych Popadiuk (Ukrainian: Зорян Володимирович Попадюк; born 21 April 1953) is a Ukrainian human rights activist and former Soviet dissident. He was one of the leaders of the Ukrainian National Front, an underground group that protested the Warsaw Pact invasion of Czechoslovakia, and was arrested in 1973 for his protest against the Soviet ban on celebrating the Shevchenko Days.

== Biography ==
Zorian Volodymyrovych Popadiuk was born on 21 April 1953 in the city of Lviv, then part of the Soviet Union. His mother, Liubomar Popadiuk, was a teacher of German at the University of Lviv, and his grandfather had been a member of the Ukrainian Sich Riflemen. Her support of liberalism and Western European political ideology influenced the young Popadiuk's worldview. Further influences came from the discovery of a 1939 mass grave dug by the Red Army after the Dniester river flooded. Much of his child was spent in the city of Sambir.

At the age of fifteen, Popadiuk witnessed a unit of the Soviet Army travelling through his town on the way to join the Warsaw Pact invasion of Czechoslovakia. The event greatly impacted Popadiuk, and solidified his political antipathy to communism. He wrote leaflets in condemnation of the invasion and called on readers to protest. Along with his classmates, Popadiuk established the Ukrainian National Front, an underground dissident group that distributed samvydav against the invasion of Czechoslovakia and communist rule in Ukraine. The group claimed continuity from a previously established group of the same name led by Zenovii Krasivskyi. As Popadiuk began studying at the University of Lviv, the organisation continued to grow in size, and it distributed copies of The Ukrainian Herald, an independent newspaper edited by Viacheslav Chornovil, in the early 1970s.

On 28 March 1973, celebrations of the Shevchenko Days (the anniversary of Taras Shevchenko's birth) were banned across Ukraine for the first time since the end of Polish rule in western Ukraine. In response, the Ukrainian National Front organised a series of protests, for which Popadiuk and several others were arrested. Popadiuk was charged with anti-Soviet agitation and organisation of a criminal group. He was expelled from university, and, along with fellow organiser of the Ukrainian National Front Yaromyr Mykytko, was sentenced to five years of imprisonment and seven years of internal exile. He served his sentence in the Mordovian Autonomous Soviet Socialist Republic and at Corrective Colony No. 2 in the city of Vladimir. Popadiuk later noted that he was treated with care and respect by other prisoners in the camps, particularly veterans of the Ukrainian Insurgent Army, with whom he often discussed poetry and literature.

Popadiuk's exile was spent first in Imeni Matrosova, Magadan Oblast, before he was later moved to Aktobe Region due to health issues. While still in exile, Popadiuk was again arrested on 31 August 1982 and charged with anti-Soviet agitation for expressing his opposition to the introduction of martial law in Poland. He was sentenced this time to ten years' imprisonment and five years' internal exile, and he spent his tenure at Perm-35 and Perm-36. In response, international human rights organisation Amnesty International declared him to be a prisoner of conscience. While at Perm-36, Popadiuk became a member of the Ukrainian human rights movement among the camp's prisoners, and he was repeatedly placed in solitary confinement for joining prisoners' strikes and protests. On 20 January 1987, he was moved to the Perm-12 camp. 16 days later, on 5 February, he was pardoned and released to return to Ukraine, as part of an amnesty on 42 political prisoners.

Following his release, Popadiuk was one of several members of the Ukrainian Initiative Group for the Liberation of Prisoners of Conscience, along with Vasyl Barladianu, Chornovil, Ivan Gel, Mykhailo Horyn (the group's leader), and Stepan Khmara. He returned to Sambir, where he was a member of both the city's government and the government of Sambir Raion.

As of 2017, Popadiuk was living in Lviv with his children and grandchild, living on a state pension after retiring from politics.
