= Vasyl Barladianu =

Ukrainian human rights activist, journalist, and poet (1942–2010)

- Василь Барладяну
- Born: 23 August 1942; Șipca, Transnistria Governorate, Romania (now Moldova)
- Died: 3 December 2010 (aged 68); Odesa, Ukraine
- Education: Odesa University; University of Bucharest; Sofia University
- Political party: Communist Party of the Soviet Union (until 1974)

Vasyl Volodymyrovych Barladianu (Ukrainian: Васи́ль Володи́мирович Барладя́ну; 23 August 1942 – 3 December 2010) was a Ukrainian human rights activist, journalist, and poet.

== Biography ==
Vasyl Volodymyrovych Barladianu was born on 23 August 1942 in the village of Șipca, in the present-day region of Transnistria. He was the grandson of Andrii Hulyi-Hulenko, a brigadier general of the Ukrainian People's Army. His father, as the son of Hulyi-Hulenko, was deported to the Mongolian People's Republic to work at a uranium mine, where he died in 1945.

Barladianu studied Russian literature at Odesa University, later studying at the universities of Sofia and Bucharest. He worked as an art historian at museums in Moscow, Leningrad, Prague, and western Ukraine throughout the mid-1960s. During the 1960s, Barladianu also began to publish poetry. He worked in the Russian language from 1960 to 1965, afterwards writing exclusively in Ukrainian. This was accompanied by a more patriotic tone in his works.

In the early 1970s, Barladianu became a Soviet dissident, publishing samvydav under the pseudonym of Yan Dubrala. Barladianu's samvydav primarily concerned the rights of Ukrainians within the Russian Empire and the Soviet Union, as well as the arrests of other dissidents, such as Nina Strokata Karavanska. In May 1972, Barladianu began being investigated by the KGB of Ukraine, and he was subject to interrogation on 28 January 1974 after being accused of nationalism. He was expelled from the Communist Party of the Soviet Union on 11 March 1974, and removed from his position as an instructor at Odesa University on 5 May.

== 1977 Arrest and Trial ==
Barladianu was arrested on 2 March 1977 by the Odesa Prosecutor's Office, and he was sentenced to three years' imprisonment for "slandering the Soviet state" on the basis of his poetry. He was imprisoned at Camp OP-318/76 in the village of Polytsi, Rivne Oblast, where he worked on a quarry. Barladianu spent a total of 13 months and 17 days of his three-year sentence engaging in various hunger strikes. He continued to write while imprisoned, including a collection of poems (titled Between Humanity and Loneliness), two series of short stories (The Magician's Tablets and Lessons of History), and several articles condemning the Soviet government for its treatment of dissidents. The works were published in Paris in 1979 as a singular book, titled Woe from Wit.

On 29 February 1980, three days before his scheduled release, Barladianu was arrested while imprisoned. He was sentenced to a further three years of imprisonment on 13 August 1980 for the same charges as his first sentence. He served this sentence at various prisons in Ukraine's eastern Donetsk Oblast, before being released in 1983. Following his release, he returned to Odesa.

== Post-1985 ==
Amidst Perestroika, Barladianu resumed his activities in the dissident movement. He began working for Radio Liberty, as well as The Ukrainian Herald, in 1987, and he was a co-founder of the Ukrainian Initiative Group for the Liberation of Prisoners of Conscience, alongside Mykhailo Horyn, Viacheslav Chornovil, Ivan Gel, Stepan Khmara, and Zorian Popadiuk.

Following the 1989–1991 Ukrainian revolution, Barladianu returned to his job at Odesa University, and he additionally became a member of the National Writers' Union of Ukraine. He was awarded the Order of Merit on 25 November 2005 by President of Ukraine Viktor Yushchenko. Barladianu died on 3 December 2010 in Odesa.
