= Kalynets =

Kalynets (Ukrainian: Калинець) is a Ukrainian surname. Notable people with the surname include:

- Ihor Kalynets (1939–2025), Ukrainian poet and Soviet dissident
- Iryna Kalynets (1940–2012), Ukrainian poet, writer, activist and Soviet dissident, wife of Ihor
