= Vasyl Ovsienko =

Ukrainian writer, human rights activist, and Soviet dissident (1949–2023)

- Василь Овсієнко
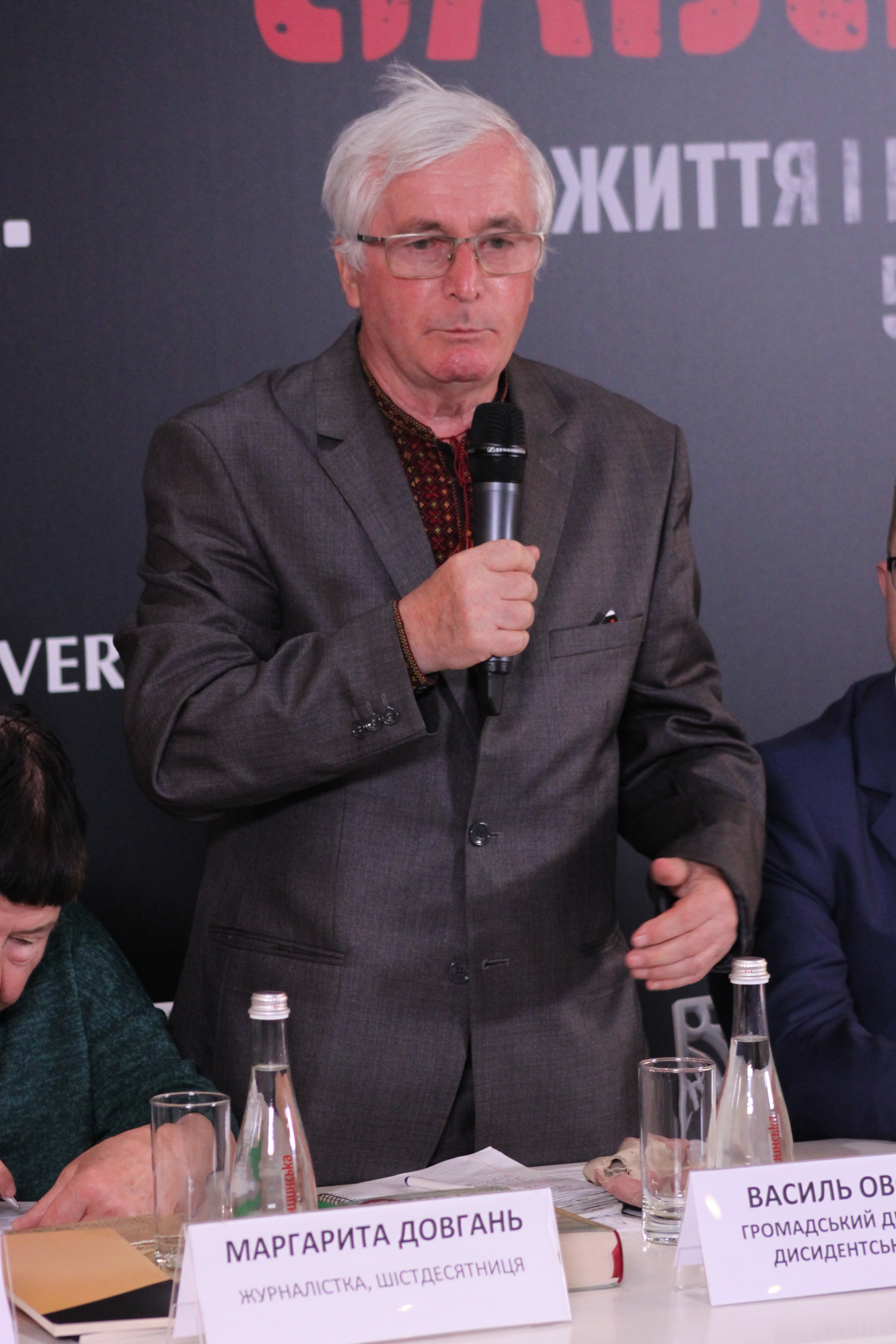
- Ovsienko in 2019
- Born: 8 May 1949; Lenine, Zhytomyr Oblast, USSR (now Ukraine)
- Died: 19 June 2023 (aged 73); Kyiv, Ukraine
- Education: Kyiv State University
- Organization: Ukrainian Helsinki Group
- Movement: Soviet dissidents
- Criminal charges: Anti-Soviet agitation (1973, 1981); Resisting arrest (1977)
- Penalty: Four years' imprisonment (1973); Three years' imprisonment (1977); Ten years' imprisonment, five years' internal exile (1981)

Vasyl Vasyliovych Ovsienko (Ukrainian: Васи́ль Васи́льович Овсіє́нко; 8 April 1949 – 19 June 2023) was a Ukrainian writer, human rights activist, and Soviet dissident who worked as a member of the Ukrainian Helsinki Group and founded the Kharkiv Human Rights Protection Group.

== Early life and career ==
Vasyl Vasyliovych Ovsienko was born into a peasant family on 8 April 1949 in the village of Lenino (now Stavky) in the Ukrainian Soviet Socialist Republic of the Soviet Union. He was the ninth and youngest surviving child in his family. His father had received two years of education, while his mother had received no formal education and was illiterate. His maternal family was descended from members of the Polish szlachta. At an early age, Ovsienko became captivated by literature, writing poetry. Some of his works were published in the local Star of Polesia newspaper.

Ovsienko first came into contact with ethnographer Vasyl Skurativskyi in the mid-1960s, and was introduced to the Sixtiers political movement from him. He was further introduced to the samizdat of Vasyl Symonenko in 1965, while studying at philology at Kyiv State University. He helped to propagate samizdat as a student and afterwards as a teacher in the village of Tashan.

== First arrest ==
With the beginning of the 1972–1973 Ukrainian purge, the leaders of the Sixtier were arrested and reform-minded Petro Shelest was removed as First Secretary of the Communist Party of Ukraine. Ovsienko continued to publish samizdat alongside Vasyl Lisovyi and Yevhen Proniuk. Proniuk and Lisovyi were both arrested in summer 1972, while Ovsienko was arrested on 5 March 1973. Threatened with punitive psychiatry, Ovsienko gave up the names of individuals he had given samizdat. He was sentenced to four years' imprisonment.

During his first sentence (spent in Mordovia) Ovsienko became acclimated with other political prisoners, and had begun participating in hunger strikes and prison strikes within a year of his term. He left prison on 9 February 1977, met with Lisovyi in Zhytomyr, and returned to Lenino a month later. Following his return to Lenino Ovsienko created a makeshift radio antenna and used it to obtain broadcasts from the Ukrainian-language service of Radio Liberty. After hearing about the founding of the Ukrainian Helsinki Group in a Radio Liberty broadcast, Ovsienko spread the news to close friends. He also again began publishing samizdat, this time publishing the poetry of Vasyl Stus.

== Second arrest ==
Ovsienko was again arrested in November of that year. Ovsienko was charged with resisting arrest, including insulting an officer and ripping two buttons from his jacket, and sentenced to three years' imprisonment. The 1977 arrest occurred after he had met with Ukrainian Helsinki Group activists Oksana Meshko and Olha Babych (sister of imprisoned activist Serhii Babych), and both Meshko and Babych were also arrested shortly after the meeting. Amnesty International later argued in 1982 that the charges against Ovsienko were false. Ovsienko spent his second sentence in prisons in Ukraine's Zhytomyr and Zaporizhzhia Oblasts. While imprisoned, he joined the Ukrainian Helsinki Group in 1978.

== Third arrest ==
Six months before his release he was once again sentenced, this time to further charges of anti-Soviet agitation for openly discussing the Holodomor. He was placed in the Perm-36 labour colony, with unsanitary and crowded conditions. In Perm-36 he was imprisoned alongside individuals convicted for involvement in the Dymshits–Kuznetsov hijacking affair.

As part of the Perestroika reforms promoted by Soviet leader Mikhail Gorbachev, Ovsienko, along with all other political prisoners in Perm-36, was moved to the Perm-35 prison on 8 December 1987. Ovsienko was urged to write a statement providing grounds for a pardon, but refused (along with several other political prisoners) out of the belief that he had been wrongfully convicted. He was pardoned a year later in spite of his refusal to write a statement, being among the final five to be released (alongside Mykola Horbal, Ivan Kandyba, M. Alekseyev, and Enn Tarto).

On 21 August 1988 Ovsienko boarded a plane from Perm to Kyiv. Originally intended to be sent to Lukyanivska Prison, he was instead imprisoned at the KGB headquarters. A day later, he was released and allowed to return to Zhytomyr, and from there reached Lenino. He returned to Perm-36 a year later to participate in the reburials of Vasyl Stus, Yuriy Lytvyn, and Oleksa Tykhy, who had all died during their sentences at the prison.

== Later life and death ==
Following his release Ovsienko continued to be active in the human rights scene of Ukraine. With the Ukrainian Helsinki Group's legalisation in 1988 he was appointed as head of the group's branch in Zhytomyr Oblast. However, he failed to establish a chapter of the Helsinki Group or the People's Movement of Ukraine in his native village. In 1994 an apartment was purchased for him by his supporters, and further monetary aid was provided by Mykhailo Horyn and John Kolasky.

In the late 1990s he organised expeditions to Sandarmokh and the Solovetsky Islands, where mass killings had occurred during the Great Purge. In the early 2000s, along with Yevgen Zakharov, Ovsienko wrote a four-volume compendium of dissidents in the Eastern Bloc, including around 200 Ukrainian political prisoners.

Ovsienko died on 19 July 2023. In February 2024 the Belgorod Street in Kyiv was renamed to Vasyl Ovsienko Street.
