= 1965–1966 Ukrainian purge =

Mass arrests by the Soviet government

- Part of the Sixtier movement and the Russification of Ukraine
- Date: August 1965 – May 1966
- Location: Ukrainian SSR, Soviet Union
- Motive: Ukrainian opposition to the Soviet government, anti-communist samydav publications
- Target: Sixtiers
- Perpetrators: Petro Shelest, KGB (KGB of Ukraine)
- Arrests: ≈190–200
- Convicted: ≈20

From August 1965 to May 1966, the government of the Ukrainian Soviet Socialist Republic orchestrated a mass arrest of intellectuals associated with the counter-culture Sixtier movement. Occurring simultaneously with the Sinyavsky–Daniel trial, the purge occurred without the knowledge of western media until the publication of journalist Viacheslav Chornovil's petition (popularly known as The Chornovil Papers). An estimated 190–200 people were arrested during the purge.

== Background ==
The Khrushchev Thaw led to the emergence of new expressions of culture in the Ukrainian Soviet Socialist Republic. Following filmmaker Alexander Dovzhenko's 1955 call for the "expansion of the creative boundaries of socialist realism", young Ukrainian intellectuals began creating art and artistic criticism that openly defied socialist realist principles in what later became known as the Sixtier movement. The Sixtiers played an important role in Ukraine's cultural revival following the Stalin era.

Soviet leader Nikita Khrushchev was removed in 1964, bringing an end to the Khrushchev Thaw. While some of the Sixtiers chose to cooperate with the newly established government of Leonid Brezhnev, many others were further radicalised. Ukrainian samydav took an increasingly-confrontational attitude towards the government, Ukrainian diaspora publications were more frequently distributed, and the movement to preserve Ukrainian culture adopted a greater political character.

== Purge ==
In late August 1965, the KGB issued orders to its Ukrainian branch to begin arresting intellectuals. From 24 August to 4 September 25 leading Sixtiers (seven in Kyiv (Note: Ivan Svitlychnyi, P. Morhun, Oleksandr Martynenko, I. Rusyn, Yivha Kuznetsova, Yaroslav Hevrych, and Mykola Hryn.) and 17 in Lviv, (Note: Ivan Gel, Mykhailo and Bohdan Horyn, Mykhaylo Osadchy, Mykhailo Kosiv, S. Baturyn, Hanna Sadovska, Myroslava Zvarychevska, Yaroslava Menkush, Mykhailo Masiutko, Ihor Gereta, Mefodii Chubatyi, Valentyn Moroz, Dmytro Ivashchenko, Mykhailo Ozernyi, V. Ivanyshyn, Opanas Zalyvakha, and Anatolii Shevchuk.) according to the Kharkiv Human Rights Protection Group; other sources claim further locations, for those arrested, such as Odesa for Gereta and Krasne railway station for Mykhailo Horyn.) were arrested on charges of anti-Soviet agitation. While the dates of the arrests are agreed upon, sources differ as to the individuals arrested on each date. For example, Bohdan Horyn recalled that he and Mykhailo Horyn were arrested on the same date as Kosiv (26 September), while the Resistance Movement in Ukraine encyclopedia states that Kosiv was not arrested until 27 September, being arrested alongside Zalyvakha and Gereta.

The initial arrests had the opposite of the intended effect; far from cowing the Ukrainian intelligentsia into cooperation with the government, it encouraged them to more actively protest against worsening human rights conditions. On 4 September 1965, at the film theatre Ukraine premiere of Sergei Parajanov's Shadows of Forgotten Ancestors, leading Ukrainian intellectual Ivan Dziuba, along with student Vasyl Stus and with the support of journalist Viacheslav Chornovil, staged a protest against the arrests. Dziuba claimed that the film's status was overshadowed by the ongoing purge, and began listing the names of those arrested. As he was being escorted out of the theatre by the director, Stus called on those "against the revival of Stalinism" to stand up.

After September, the arrests continued, although at a decreased rate. Sviatoslav Karavanskyi was arrested in Odesa on 13 November, according to both Bohdan Horyn and Resistance Movement in Ukraine. Shevchuk's arrest, according to Horyn and Resistance Movement in Ukraine, later occurred in Zhytomyr on 23 May 1966, the last of the significant arrests.

A total of around 190 to 200 people were arrested.

=== The Chornovil Papers ===
At the time of the purge, Viacheslav Chornovil was a state journalist associated with the Lviv Komsomol. Tasked with covering the trials of those purged and giving evidence against intellectuals, Chornovil refused to give evidence to support the conviction of Osadchy (as well as Mykhailo and Bohdan Horyn and Zvarycheska, according to historian Vasyl Shvydkyi). As a result, he was fired from his job as a correspondent at the Second Reading newspaper. Chornovil wrote a series of papers documenting the 1965 purge and those arrested, and sent them to the Ukrainian government. For the first of the papers, he was arrested on 8 July 1966 and sentenced to a 20% reduction in salary. For an open letter to Ukrainian communist leader Petro Shelest, in which he argued that the arrests were contrary to Soviet law, Chornovil was arrested and sentenced to eight months of hard labour in Mordovia. Chornovil's writings were later compiled into a single book and smuggled overseas to France, where they were published as The Chornovil Papers.

The Chornovil Papers captivated the attention of the American public, which had previously been focused on the simultaneous Sinyavsky–Daniel trial. Zbigniew Brzezinski, a member of the Policy Planning Staff at the State Department, wrote the foreword to the 1969 McGraw Hill Education-published translation of The Chornovil Papers. Far-right American legislator John M. Ashbrook entered selections of the papers into the Congressional Record while criticising opposition to United States involvement in the Vietnam War.

== Aftermath ==
The failure of the purge to stifle Ukrainian national expression led to an escalation of the conflict between the Soviet government and the intelligentsia. A second, much larger wave of purges began in 1972, one which forced Shelest from power and caused him to be replaced by Chairman of the Council of Ministers Volodymyr Shcherbytsky.

The 1965–1966 purge also established Chornovil's status in Ukrainian dissident communities. His refusal to testify against arrested dissidents and his role in publicising the purge immediately marked him as a leading Ukrainian Soviet dissident, and ultimately placed him on the course that led to his leadership of the 1989–1991 Ukrainian revolution and the People's Movement of Ukraine.
