= The Ukrainian Herald (1970–1972, 1987–1989) =

1970–1972, 1987–1989 independent newspaper in Ukraine, Soviet Union

- Cover of the compiled first and second editions of The Ukrainian Herald
- Publisher: None (samvydav)
- Editor-in-chief: Viacheslav Chornovil
- Editor: 1970–1971 (no. 1-5): Yaroslav Kendzior; Mykhailo Kosiv; 1972 (no. 6): Vasyl Lisovyi; Yevhen Proniuk; 1974 (no. 7-8): Stepan Khmara; 1987–1989: Ivan Gel; Mykhailo Horyn; Pavlo Skochok
- Founded: January 1970
- Ceased publication: March 1972; 1974; 11 July 1988
- Relaunched: 1974; 5 December 1987
- Political alignment: Dissident
- Language: Ukrainian
- City: Lviv
- Country: Soviet Union (Ukrainian SSR)
- Free online archives: museum.khpg.org/1127256682

The Ukrainian Herald (Ukrainian: «Український вісник», romanized: Ukrainskyi visnyk) was an independent, self-published newspaper which was distributed clandestinely in the Ukrainian Soviet Socialist Republic in 1970–1972, 1974, and later from 1987 to 1989. Led by Viacheslav Chornovil, it was the first independent newspaper in Ukrainian history.

== History ==
The Ukrainian Herald began in January 1970 as a project by Ukrainian Soviet dissident leader Viacheslav Chornovil. Coming off the 1965–1966 Ukrainian purge, the Sixtier movement had been reconstituted into a more openly oppositional movement, which believed that the Soviet Union could not be improved through informing the government about human rights abuses, but needed to be confronted directly. Chornovil gathered a group of like-minded activists, including two fellow editors, Mykhailo Kosiv and Yaroslav Kendzior, and some of Ukraine's leading dissidents as writers.

The Ukrainian Herald published throughout Ukraine, reaching from its original publishing place in the western city of Lviv to the eastern Dnipropetrovsk and Donetsk. Copies of the newspaper also circulated among the Ukrainian diaspora, being transferred across the Czechoslovak border. Similarly to the Chronicle of Current Events in Moscow, The Ukrainian Herald reported on political repression and political prisoners. Additionally, however, it was involved in the publication of samvydav lacking the character of news, such as information about the Holodomor, literature, and history.

In August 1971, a criminal prosecution was initiated against the newspaper on the initiative of Ukrainian KGB leader Vitaly Fedorchuk. The publishers were accused of threatening the "friendship of peoples", national policies, political and social order of the USSR, putting into question the possibility of establishing Communism and damaging Soviet Union's reputation on the international arena. However, the personalities of the newspaper's editors couldn't be determined by the investigators.

Other Ukrainian dissidents, such as Ivan Svitlychnyi, feared that the spread of The Ukrainian Herald would lead to increased persecution of the dissident movement. Vasyl Ovsienko, a dissident and human rights activist, recounted that a Soviet official later told Svitlychnyi "As long as you were not organised, we tolerated you. Therefore, when you have a magazine, we will not tolerate you." By mid-1971 the publication of The Ukrainian Herald had stopped in an effort to prevent the arrest of its members, but it proved to be too late: a massive crackdown on Ukrainian intelligentsia began in January 1972.

Following his arrest, Chornovil refused to acknowledge his role as the newspaper's editor, and investigators' inability to confirm his role spared him a longer term of imprisonment. Despite the arrest of its main figure, The Ukrainian Herald continued publishing for some time, with issue number 6, containing information on the ongoing arrests, being published in March 1972 by Vasyl Lisovyi and Yevhen Proniuk. In spring 1974, issues 7–8, dedicated to the events of the preceding two years, were produced by Stepan Khmara. Criminal prosecution against the newspaper was closed on 21 March 1974, based on a conclusion, that all people related to its publication and spread had been imprisoned.

The Ukrainian Herald returned in 1987, amidst the glasnost policy of Mikhail Gorbachev and following Chornovil's 1985 return from exile in the Yakut Autonomous Soviet Socialist Republic. According to Taras Chornovil, Viacheslav Chornovil's son and a Ukrainian politician, the editorial board met at Chornovil's home, where they received letters for individuals to submit material. The younger Chornovil claimed that the editorial board was overly-focused on publishing their own materials at the expense of other individuals, leading to a decrease in the newspaper's quality. The newspaper became part of the Ukrainian Helsinki Group in January 1988, and ceased publication in 1989, when it became The Ukrainian Herald Express.

== Legacy ==
The publication of The Ukrainian Herald marked a watershed event in the history of the Ukrainian press, leading journalist Vakhtang Kipiani to compare its impact on Ukraine to that of Pravda on the CPSU. A biographer of Chornovil, V. I. Matiash, argued that The Ukrainian Herald was the predecessor of Ukraine's modern-day independent press.
