= Yaroslav Kendzior =

Ukrainian journalist, human rights activist, and politician

- Ярослав Кендзьор
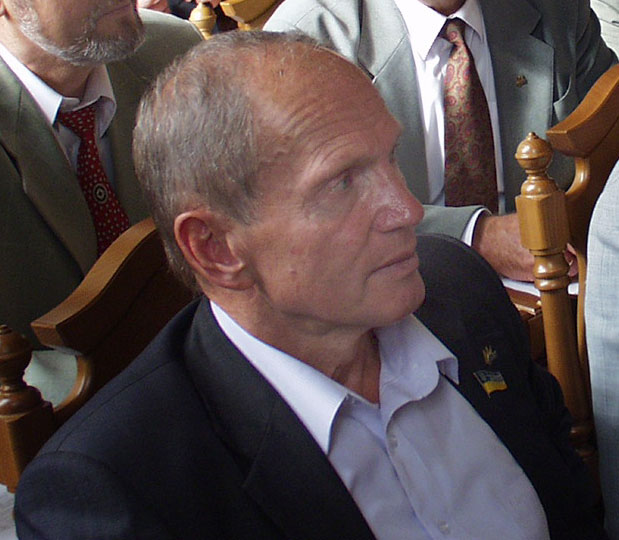
- Kendzior in 2005

People's Deputy of Ukraine
- In office 23 March 1999 – 12 December 2012
- Constituency: People's Movement of Ukraine, No. 44 (1999–2002); Our Ukraine Bloc, No. 48 (2002–2006); Our Ukraine Bloc, No. 59 (2006–2007); Our Ukraine Bloc, No. 78 (2007–2012)
- In office 15 May 1990 – 12 May 1998
- Constituency: Lviv Oblast, Sokal

Personal details
- Born: 12 July 1941 (age 84) Solonka, Ukrainian SSR, Soviet Union (now Ukraine)
- Party: People's Movement of Ukraine (until 2009)
- Other political affiliations: Democratic Bloc; Our Ukraine Bloc
- Education: University of Lviv (expelled); Lviv State University of Physical Culture

Military service
- Allegiance: Soviet Union
- Branch/service: Soviet Army

Yaroslav-Petro Mykhailovych Kendzior (Ukrainian: Яросла́в-Пе́тро Миха́йлович Ке́ндзьор; born 12 July 1941) is a Ukrainian journalist, human rights activist, and politician who served as a People's Deputy of Ukraine from 1990 to 1998 and from 1999 to 2012. He was previously part of the editorial staff of The Ukrainian Herald, alongside Viacheslav Chornovil and Mykhailo Kosiv.

== Early life and career ==
Yaroslav Mykhailovych Kendzior was born in the village of Solonka on 12 July 1941. From 1963 to 1966 he studied at the University of Lviv, where he was a member of the Sixtiers counterculture movement. He was expelled in May 1966 and barred from membership in the Communist Party of the Soviet Union for being in contact with members of the Ukrainian Soviet dissident movement, particularly Viacheslav Chornovil and Ivan Svitlychnyi. He later studied at the Lviv State University of Physical Culture from 1968 to 1976, and afterwards served as an instructor for the Avanhard sports society. He was conscripted to the Soviet Army.

From 1970 to 1972, Kendzior was part of the editorial staff of The Ukrainian Herald, an underground independent newspaper, alongside Mykhailo Kosiv and head editor Chornovil. During the 1972–1973 Ukrainian purge Kendzior protested against the mass arrests of intelligentsia by the KGB; as a result, his home was searched and he was subject to interrogation, but he was not charged with any crime.

Glasnost and the beginning of the 1989–1991 Ukrainian revolution led Kendzior to reenter politics. He joined the Ukrainian Helsinki Group in 1988 and became a member of its press service, working there until 1990. He was also a member of the Memorial society and the People's Movement of Ukraine (Rukh).

== Political career ==
Kendzior was elected as a People's Deputy of Ukraine for the first time during the 1990 Ukrainian Supreme Soviet election, participating as a member of the Democratic Bloc from the Lviv Oblast city of Sokal. He was re-elected in 1994 as a member of Rukh, but his attempt to win in Ukraine's 124th electoral district in 1998 failed; he won 24.7% of the vote, placing second to Ihor Pylypchuk of the National Front.

Kendzior returned to the Verkhovna Rada (Ukraine's parliament) in March 1999 as 44th on the party list of Rukh. Following the party's split he remained part of the original Rukh's faction, and he was re-elected in 2002, 2006, and 2007 as a Rukh member included in the Our Ukraine Bloc.

Kendzior was removed from Rukh on 25 January 2009, alongside Ivan Stoiko. Kendzior claimed that the move was retaliation by party leader Borys Tarasyuk to their opposition to a political alliance with the Yulia Tymoshenko Bloc, and stated that the bloc was opposed to the renovation of the Razumovski Palace in Baturyn, recognition of the Holodomor, the Ukrainian language, the Organisation of Ukrainian Nationalists and Ukrainian Insurgent Army, and the Ukrainian government.

=== Political positions ===
Kendzior told Stepan Barna in 2011 that the Verkhovna Rada Cultural and Spiritual Committee would not support a bill allowing for the privatisation of the Pochaiv Lavra, supported by the Party of Regions. In response to a 2012 statement by Bulgarian President Rosen Plevneliev that God is Bulgarian, Kendzior claimed that Jesus Christ was born in Galicia.

Kendzior supported Petro Poroshenko in the 2019 Ukrainian presidential election. In particular, he cited decentralisation, the autocephaly of the Orthodox Church of Ukraine, reforms to the Armed Forces of Ukraine, the language policy, and efforts to achieve membership of NATO and the European Union as his reasons for supporting Poroshenko. He referred to Volodymyr Zelenskyy as a blazen, and contrasted his supporters with Vasyl Stus, who he claimed would not understand why people would support him.

== Personal life ==
Kendzior is married, and has two children; one son, Ostap (born 1983), and one daughter, Solomiia (born 1968). He maintains an archive of personal video cassettes, going as far back as 1988 and including much of the 1989–1991 revolution.
