= Hanna Mykhailivna Shabatura =

Ukrainian artist (1914–2004)

- Born: 22 November 1914; Ivane-Zolote, Zalishchytskyi County, Austria-Hungary
- Died: 2 September 2004 (aged 89); Lviv, Ukraine
- Burial place: Lychakiv Cemetery, Lviv
- Occupation: Artist
- Children: Stefaniia Shabatura

Hanna Shabatura (Ukrainian: Ганна Шабатура) (22 November 1914, Ivane-Zolote – 2 September 2004, Lviv) was a Ukrainian artist.

Shabatura was the mother of artist and activist Stefaniia Shabatura.

== Biography ==
Hanna Shabatura was born into a family of Semanyks in the village of Ivane-Zolote (Zalishchytskyi County of Austria-Hungary, now Chortkiv Raion, Ternopil Oblast, Ukraine). Her family included church builders and village sculptors.

She was engaged in agriculture. Throughout her life, she reproduced ancient patterns of embroidery, was engaged in Easter-egg painting and decorative painting, and knew many folk songs. However, she began to paint only after she turned fifty. She was encouraged to do so by her daughter, who at that time worked as an artist in the textile industry.

On 12 January 1972, the KGB arrested Shabatura's daughter, Stefania, on suspicion of "anti-Soviet activity" and in the same year she was sentenced in Lviv for "anti-Soviet agitation and propaganda" under Article 62, Part 1 of the Criminal Code of the Ukrainian SSR to five years in strict regime camps and three years in exile. Shabatura was repeatedly summoned to the KGB, her apartment was searched, and attempts were also made to evict her.

While her daughter was in prison and exile, Shabatura supported the children of political prisoners and painted a lot. She created series. She depicted Easter groves, New Year celebrations, churches, landscapes, and peasants in their daily chores.

Art historians have noted her works: Nativity Scene, Holy Supper, Epiphany. Jordan, For Easter, They Are Weaving a Wedding Tree, A Boy on a Horse, Threshing, Quarry, Mill, and Plowman.

Representatives of the G. Veryovka Ukrainian Folk Choir recorded samples of her folk songs.

In the 1990s, her works were exhibited at exhibitions in Lviv and Kyiv. She was awarded the K. Bilokur Prize.

In 2004, the Hanna Shabatura book was published in the series Ukrainian Naive Painting with research by Antonina Palahniuk.

=== Death ===
Shabatura died in Lviv and was buried in field 79 of the Lychakiv Cemetery.
