= Skaba =

Skaba is a surname. Notable people with the surname include:

- Andriy Skaba (1905–1986), Ukrainian academic and historian
- Martin Skaba (1935–2024), German footballer
- Wojciech Skaba (born 1984), Polish footballer
