= Andriy Skaba =

Ukrainian historian (1905–1986)

- Born: Andriy Danylovych Skaba; 12 December 1905; Khorishky, Kobelyaksky Uyezd, Poltava Governorate Russian Empire
- Died: 26 June 1986 (aged 80); Kyiv, Ukrainian SSR, Soviet Union
- Occupations: Academic, historian

Andriy Danylovych Skaba (Ukrainian: Андрій Данилович Скаба; 12 December 1905 – 26 June 1986) was a Ukrainian academic, historian, and director of the NASU Institute of History of Ukraine from 1968 to 1973. He was a veteran of World War II (in reserves).

== Brief overview ==
In 1960s he was main ideologist of the Communist Party of Ukraine who between the later Khrushchev Thaw and the early Brezhnev's era of stagnation personified a policy of government in cultural, education, and spiritual spheres. In 1959 Skaba became a minister of restructured Ministry of Higher and General Special Education.

During his management there was a transition to the eight years of compulsory education, 82% of schools conducted their lectures in Ukrainian language, there were published multi-volume works of Ukrainian writers, established the Shevchenko Prize. At the same time in mid 1960s there intensified struggle against the nationalist intelligentsia, began persecution of Viacheslav Chornovil, Valentyn Moroz, Ivan Drach, and others (the Sixtiers in Ukraine). Nonetheless in Moscow the management of ideological department of Central Committee of the Communist Party of Ukraine was recognized as unsatisfactory and positions of Skaba as contemplative, in his address were expressed accusations in condoning of nationalist elements.

Skaba headed a commission of Central Committee of the Communist Party of Ukraine that was conducting evaluation of the Ivan Dziuba's work "Internationalism or Russification?" and concluded "...that prepared by Dzyuba material "Internationalism or Russification?" is from the beginning to the end a libel ("pasquille") about the Soviet reality, national policy of Communist Party of the Soviet Union, and practice of Communist Development in the Soviet Union".

== See also ==
- Petro Shelest

Government offices
Preceded by Borys Koval (as Minister of Higher Education)	Minister of Higher and General Special Education; 1959	Succeeded by Yuriy Dadenkov
