= Dmytro Ostapenko =

Ukrainian conductor & politician (born 1946)

- Дмитро Остапенко
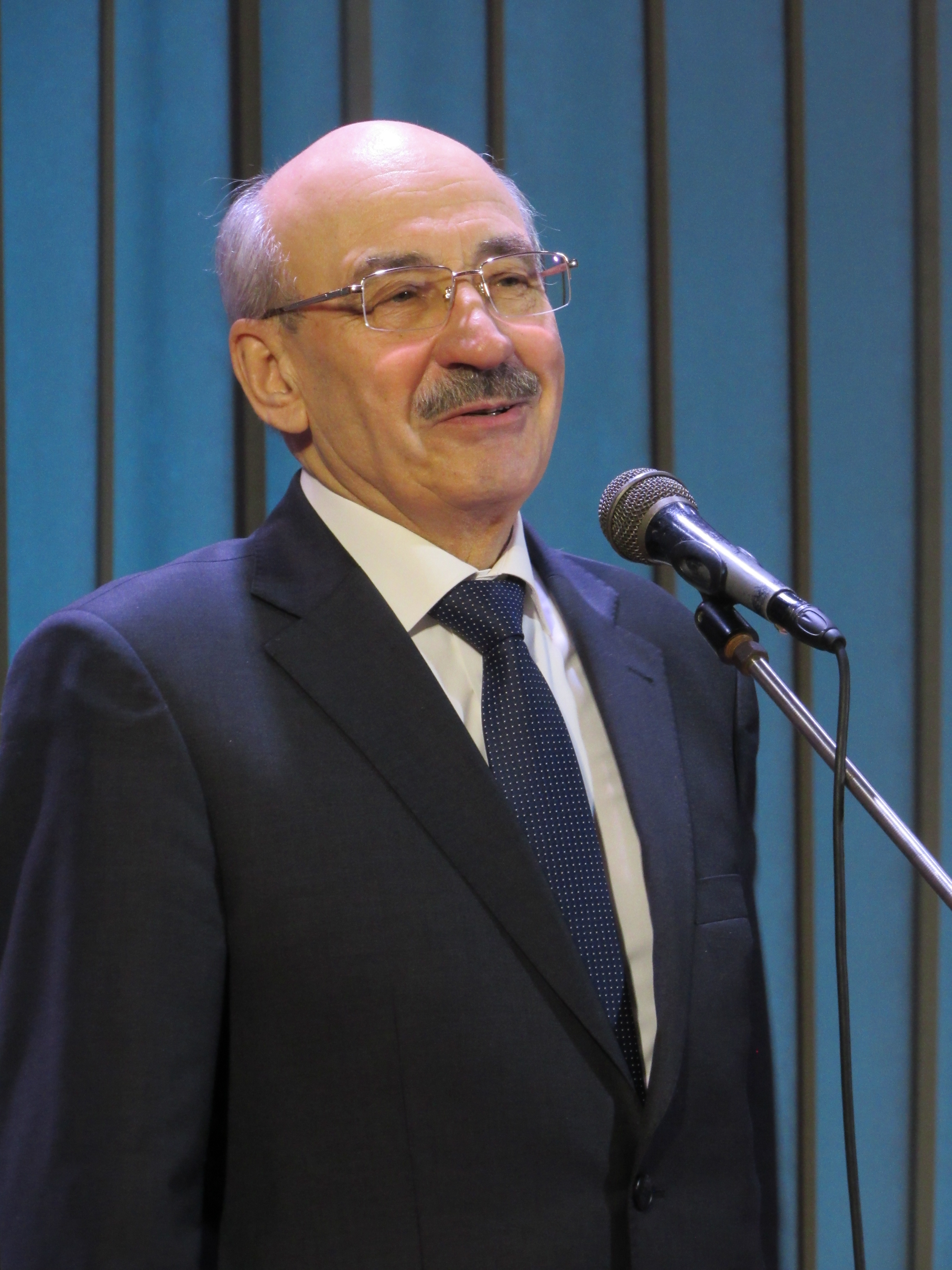
- Ostapenko in 2019

Minister of Culture and Arts of Ukraine
- In office 25 September 1995 – 4 August 1999
- President: Leonid Kuchma
- Preceded by: Ivan Dziuba
- Succeeded by: Bohdan Stupka

Personal details
- Born: 3 November 1946 (age 79) Novachyka, Ukrainian SSR, Soviet Union (now Ukraine)
- Party: Communist Party of the Soviet Union (1973–?)
- Education: Kharkiv National Kotlyarevsky University of Arts

Dmytro Ivanovych Ostapenko (Ukrainian: Дмито Іванович Остапенко; born 3 November 1946) is a Ukrainian conductor and politician who is currently director of the National Philharmonic of Ukraine. He is also a former Minister of Culture of Ukraine, having served from 1995 to 1999.

== Biography ==
Dmytro Ostapenko was born in Novachykha village, Poltava Oblast. In 1968 was graduated from the Kharkiv Institute of Arts.

From 1973 to 1977 he worked in the Kharkiv regional committee of the Young Communist League and the city committee of the Communist Party of Ukraine.

From 1977 to 1982 - Director of the Kharkiv Academic Opera and Ballet Theater.

From 1982 to 1984 - Head of the Department of Theaters and Music Institutions of the Ministry of Culture of the USSR.

From 1984 to 1991 - Instructor in the Central Committee of the Communist Party of Ukraine.

From 1991 to 1992 - Head of the Department of Culture of the Institute of Scientific Innovations of the Ukrainian Branch of the International Center for Scientific Culture "World Laboratory".

From 1992 to 1995 - Director of the National Philharmonic of Ukraine.

From 25 September 1995 to 4 August 1999, Ostapenko was Minister of Culture and Arts of Ukraine. Since 1999, he has been director of the National Philharmonic of Ukraine.

== Family ==
He has a son named Andriy Ostapenko, who is a guitarist and a soloist of the National Philharmonic of Ukraine.

== Links ==
- "Dmytro Ostapenko: "The Philharmonic's repertoire has been formed for the year ahead. Come - it will be interesting ... "". day.kyiv.ua (in Ukrainian). 2006.
- "Dmytro Ostapenko: I am the only on the contract in the philharmonic, all the others are for life". umoloda.kiev.ua. 2009.
- "Dmytro Ostapenko celebrates his 65th birthday". Musicreview (in Ukrainian). 2011.
