= John Kolasky =

Canadian-Ukrainian historian and activist (1915–1997)

- Іван Коляска
- Born: John Koliaska; October 5, 1915; Cobalt, Ontario, Canada
- Died: October 20, 1997 (aged 82); Khotiv or Kyiv, Ukraine
- Education: University of Saskatchewan; University of Toronto
- Political party: Communist Party of Canada (before 1970)
- Other political affiliations: Ukrainian Republican Party

John Kolasky (Ukrainian: Іван Васильович Коляска, romanized: Ivan Vasyliovych Koliaska; October 5, 1915 – October 20, 1997) was a Canadian-Ukrainian historian and activist. A member of the Communist Party of Canada early in his political career, Kolasky became disillusioned with communism after witnessing repressions of Ukrainians by the Soviet government, and subsequently became an anti-communist activist and supporter of Ukrainian Soviet dissidents in Canada.

== Biography ==
John Koliaska was born on October 5, 1915, in the town of Cobalt, Ontario to a Ukrainian Canadian family from Bukovina. His parents were both members of the Ukrainian Labour Farmer Temple Association, and he grew up on a farm near the city of Timmins, where his surname was Polonised to Kolasky. Following the beginning of the Great Depression Kolasky left home and worked various jobs in Timmins, Ottawa, and Winnipeg. His experience with the Great Depression radicalised him into Marxist ideals, and he became a member of the Communist Party of Canada (CPC).

In 1944 Kolasky began studying at the University of Saskatchewan as a historian, graduating in 1948. He also graduated from the University of Toronto in 1950. Over the next decade he became a prominent figure in the CPC, and he was sent to the Higher Party School of the Central Committee of the Communist Party of Ukraine in 1963 by the Association of United Ukrainian Canadians (the successor to the Ukrainian Labour Farmer Temple Association).

In Ukraine Kolasky experienced firsthand the Russification of Ukraine occurring under the Soviet government. He began disseminating samizdat regarding Russification, and was arrested in 1965 before being deported back to Canada. Following his return, Kolasky published Education in Soviet Ukraine in 1968 and Two Years in Soviet Ukraine: A Canadian's Personal Account of Russian Oppression and the Growing Opposition in 1970, both of which discussed Russification and the growing movement of Soviet dissidents in Ukraine. Following the publication of these books, Kolasky was expelled from the AUUC and the CPC. Kolasky became a speaker for events throughout Canada. He continued to publish literature about the Russification of Ukraine, including a translation of Valentyn Moroz's Report from the Beria Reserve in 1974.

Kolasky was a supporter of the Ukrainian Helsinki Group and, later, the Ukrainian Republican Party. Following the 1989–1991 Ukrainian revolution he emigrated to Ukraine and lived with Levko Lukianenko. He died in the village of Khotiv or in the Ukrainian capital of Kyiv on October 20, 1997.

== Bibliography ==
- Kolasky, John (1968). Education in Soviet Ukraine: A Study in Discrimination and Russification. Toronto: Peter Martin Associates.
- Kolasky, John (1970). A Canadian's Personal Account of Russian Oppression and the Growing Opposition. Toronto: Peter Martin Associates. ISBN 9780887780370.
- Kolasky, John (1972). Look Comrade, The People are Laughing. Toronto: Peter Martin Associates. ISBN 9780887780707.
- Kolasky, John; Moroz, Valentyn (1974). Report from the Beria Reserve. Toronto: Peter Martin Associates. ISBN 0-88778-189-6.
- Kolasky, John (1979). The Shattered Illusion: The History of the Ukrainian Pro-Communist Organizations in Canada. Toronto: Peter Martin Associates. ISBN 978-0887780974.
- Kolasky, John (1990). Partners in Tyranny: The Nazi-Soviet Nonaggression Pact August 23, 1939. Toronto: The Mackenzie Institute. ISBN 0-921877-14-5.
