= Șipca, Transnistria =

Șipca Шипка (Russian) Шипка (Ukrainian)
- Commune
- Location within Moldova
- Coordinates: 47°9′59″N 29°30′19″E
- Country (de jure): Moldova
- Country (de facto): Transnistria (Note: Transnistria's political status is disputed. It considers itself to be an independent state, but this is not recognised by any UN member state. The Moldovan government and the international community consider Transnistria a part of Moldova's territory.)
- Elevation: 143 m (469 ft)
- Time zone: UTC+2 (EET)
  - Summer (DST): UTC+3 (EEST)

Șipca (Moldovan Cyrillic and Russian: Шипка, romanized: Shipka; Ukrainian: Шипка, romanized: Shypka) is a commune in the Grigoriopol sub-district of Transnistria, Moldova. It is composed of two villages, Șipca and Vesioloe (Веселе, Весёлое). It is currently under the administration of the breakaway government of the Transnistrian Moldovan Republic.

According to the 2004 census, the population of the commune was 2,293 inhabitants, of which 662 (28.87%) were Moldovans (Romanians), 1,479 (64.5%) Ukrainians and 118 (5.14%) Russians.

== Notable people ==
- Vasyl Barladianu (1942–2010), human rights activist, journalist and poet
