= Internationalism or Russification? =

1965 book by Ivan Dziuba

- Author: Ivan Dziuba
- Original title: Інтернаціоналізм чи русифікація?
- Publisher: Suchasnist
- Publication date: February 1968
- English publication date: 1968 (Weidenfeld & Nicolson, London; Humanities Press, New York)

Internationalism or Russification? (Ukrainian: «Інтернаціоналізм чи русифікація?») is a book by Ukrainian writer and social activist Ivan Dziuba. It was written in late 1965 as a supplement to a letter sent in December 1965 to the First Secretary of the Communist Party of Ukraine, Petro Shelest, in defense of the numerous Ukrainian writers arrested during that year. After illegally circulating as samvydav for some time in the Ukrainian SSR, it was published in Ukrainian in February 1968 by Suchasnist in Munich, and in English by Weidenfeld & Nicolson in London, as well as by Humanities Press in New York.

== Background ==
During the 1965–1966 Ukrainian purge, Soviet authorities were secretly arresting Ukrainian creative intelligentsia. In September 1965, at the premiere of the film Shadows of Forgotten Ancestors in the Kyiv cinema "Ukraine", Dziuba, Vasyl Stus and Viacheslav Chornovil jointly publicly protested against this government policy, thereby making information about these secret arrests public. At the end of 1965, Dziuba wrote his work Internationalism or Russification?.

Dziuba himself always maintained he was neither anti-communist nor anti-Soviet, but an idealist who sought to change the system from within. He never intended to become a public figure or to enter into politics; rather, he wished to study languages and literature. But because he could not sit and watch the Ukrainian language and literature being repressed and Russified for no good reason, he decided to speak out. His wife Marta reasoned that his performances at literary evenings, where he was well-known for logical argumentation and seeking justification for the way things are done, also made him quite popular, and contributed to Dziuba unintentionally becoming a symbol against Russification and for Ukrainian culture.

== Summary ==
In the work Internationalism or Russification?, 214 pages long, written under the influence of those events, Dziuba analyzed from a Marxist position the national and cultural policy of the Soviet Union in Ukraine. Dziuba argued that during Joseph Stalin's rule the CPSU had moved to the positions of Russian chauvinism. The author built his argumentation largely on quotations from the works of Vladimir Lenin and party documents of the 1920s. He believed that the Russification policy of the CPSU, particularly in Ukraine, is contradictory to the fundamental interests of the Ukrainian people and other ethnic minorities. He accordingly contended that the solution lay in returning to Lenin's principles of national policy and of Korenizatsiia.

== Reception ==
1969 Soviet retort in English for foreign circulation: What I. Dzyuba Stands For, And How He Does It (Once more about the book Internationalism or Russification?).

In December 1965, the author sent his work to the first Secretary of the Central Committee of the Communist Party of Ukraine, Petro Shelest, and to the Chairman of the Ukrainian Council of Ministers, Volodymyr Shcherbytsky, and its Russian translation – to the leadership of Communist Party of the Soviet Union (CPSU). Rather than suppressing the text, Shelest. ordered the text to be sent to the secretaries of the regional committees, saying they "needed to know the arguments of their opponents". Subsequently, the text of Internationalism or Russification began circulating through samvydav, spreading quickly through reprints and photocopies. Finally, the text from the 214-page letter was published as a book in Munich, West Germany by Ukrainian diaspora literary magazine Suchasnist in February 1968. The work was first published in English in London and New York in 1968. It also appeared in Canada around the same time.

In response to the book's rapidly increasing popularity abroad with the publication of the Ukrainian original in print, as well as English translations, on behalf of the Central Committee of the Communist Party of Ukraine, an author calling himself "Bohdan Stanchuk" wrote a lengthy refutation in 1969 in English addressed to foreign audiences, entitled What I. Dzyuba Stands For, And How He Does It (Once more about the book Internationalism or Russification?). "Bohdan Stanchuk" (or "Stenchuk") was a pseudonym used by Soviet Ukrainian authorities to criticise dissenting opinions; the real author(s) behind this and other such works are unknown. Stanchuk argued that "Dzyuba's book has nothing in common with conscientious scientific investigation... and mutilates the ideas of internationalism." He decried all the attention given to Dziuba's work: "The Ukrainian bourgeois-nationalist press and other anti-communist papers and publications in the West are devoting a great deal of space to this book". The retort provoked more samvydav responses by dissidents, including from Viacheslav Chornovil, who wrote How and what does B. Stenchuk Stand For? («Як і що обстоює Б. Стенчук?»).

A special commission of the Central Committee of the Communist Party of Ukraine inspected the text and decided that it was "lampoons on the Soviet reality, the national policy of the CPSU and the practice of communist construction in the USSR". Authorities accused Dziuba of undermining Soviet friendship of peoples, and fueling hatred between the Ukrainian and Russian peoples. In 1972, Dziuba expelled from the Writers' Union of Ukraine. His colleagues at the Writers' Union supported him, but they were powerless to prevent Dziuba's expulsion. The next year, Dziuba was sentenced to 5 years in prison and 5 years in exile by the Kyiv Oblast Court. Later, he asked for pardon and after 18 months in prison he was pardoned. For a while, no employer wanted to hire Dziuba because of how his reputation had been smeared, until he was hired to work at the aircraft manufacturing newspaper of the Antonov Serial Production Plant.

== See also ==
- Executed Renaissance
- List of Ukrainian-language writers
- Russification of Ukraine
- Chronology of Ukrainian language suppression

== Bibliography ==
=== Primary sources ===
- Dziuba, Ivan (1998). Інтернаціоналізм чи русифікація? (Internat︠s︡ionalizm chy rusyfikat︠s︡ii︠a︡?) [Internationalism or Russification?] (in Ukrainian). Kyiv: Vydavnychyĭ dim "KM Academia". ISBN 966-518-110-6. Archived from the original on 18 April 2026. Text of the 1998 edition of the book on litopys.org.ua
  - Дзюба І. М. Інтернаціоналізм чи русифікація? Переднє слово (Foreword)
- Soviet retort: Богдан Стенчук, Що і як обстоює І. Дзюба? (Ще раз про книгу «Інтернаціоналізм чи русифікація?») [Shcho i yak obstoyuye I. Dzyuba? Shche raz knyhu "Internacionalizm chy rusyfikacija?")]. Київ: Товариство культурних зв'язків з українцями за кордоном, 1969. 196 с.
  - (1970 English translation): Stanchuk, Bohdan (1970) [1969]. What I. Dzyuba Stands For, and How He Does It (Once more about the book Internationalism or Russification?). Kiev: Association for Cultural Relations with Ukrainians Abroad. p. 196.

=== Contemporary reviews ===
- Bertsch, Gary (1973). "National self-determination and proletarian internationalism. Reviewed Work(s): Internationalism or Russification: A Study in the Soviet Nationalities Problem. Second Edition by Ivan Dzyuba, and Belorussia Under Soviet Rule, 1917-1957 by Ivan S. Lubachko". Journal of International Affairs. 27 (1). Temporary Publisher: 129–132. ISSN 0022-197X. JSTOR 24356616.
- Sheehy, Ann (1969). "Review of Beyond the Urals: Economic Developments in Soviet Asia; The Formation of the Soviet Central Asian Republics: A Study in Soviet Nationalities Policy, 1917–1936; Internationalism or Russification? A Study in the Soviet Nationalities Problem". International Affairs (Royal Institute of International Affairs 1944–). 45 (1): 152–153. doi:10.2307/2612670. ISSN 0020-5850. JSTOR 2612670.
- Toma, Peter A. (1969). "Review of Internationalism or Russification?". The Western Political Quarterly. 22 (1): 203–205. doi:10.2307/446162. ISSN 0043-4078. JSTOR 446162.

=== Secondary sources ===
- "Помер Іван Дзюба: символ патріотизму і спротиву русифікації України" [Ivan Dziuba has died: a symbol of patriotism and resistance to the Russification of Ukraine]. BBC News Україна (in Ukrainian). 22 February 2022.
