= Sviatoslav Karavanskyi =

Ukrainian linguist, lexicographer, and Soviet dissident (1920–2016)

- Святослав Караванський
- Born: 24 December 1920; Odesa, Ukraine
- Died: 17 December 2016 (aged 95); Baltimore, Maryland, United States
- Education: Odesa National Polytechnic University; Odesa University
- Political party: Organisation of Ukrainian Nationalists
- Movement: Organisation of Ukrainian Nationalists, Soviet dissidents
- Spouse: Nina Strokata Karavanska (died 1998)
- Convictions: Bourgeois nationalism (1945, 1965); Anti-Soviet agitation (1970)
- Penalty: 25 years imprisonment (1945, 1965); 3 years imprisonment, 7 years corrective labour (1970)
- Military career
- Allegiance: Soviet Union; Organisation of Ukrainian Nationalists
- Conflicts: World War II; Operation Barbarossa

Sviatoslav Iosypovych Karavanskyi (Ukrainian: Святослав Йосипович Караванський; 24 December 1920 – 17 December 2016) was a Ukrainian linguist, lexicographer, writer, and Soviet dissident. A member of the Red Army and the Organisation of Ukrainian Nationalists during World War II, Karavanskyi served a total of 31 years in Soviet prisons, and was regarded as a prisoner of conscience by Amnesty International.

== Biography ==
Sviatoslav Iosypovych Karavanskyi was born on 24 December 1920 in the city of Odesa to a family of intellectuals. They had previously lived in Kyiv, but fled south during the Ukrainian–Soviet War. Karavanskyi's Ukrainian-speaking family was harassed by residents of the primarily-Russophone Odesa, leading his father to largely abandon the language. As a child, he displayed a strong interest in writing, and his poems were shown in the local press organs of the Young Pioneers. His father was an associate professor at the Odesa National Polytechnic University, which prompted Karavanskyi to begin studying at the university's industrial institute in 1938. Within a year, however, Karavanskyi had decided that he wished to pursue a career in linguistics, and he decided to transfer to the institute of foreign languages. He soon lost interest in this as well, and chose to enlist in the Red Army in 1940.

Involved in fighting from the early days of Operation Barbarossa, Karavanskyi's unit was encircled in western Belarus in July 1941. Karavanskyi avoided being taken as a prisoner of war, and returned to Odesa (now under Romanian occupation) in early 1942. He began studying literature at Odesa University, and joined an underground group belonging to Stepan Bandera's wing of the Organisation of Ukrainian Nationalists. Karavanskyi was given the pseudonym of "Balzac" (Ukrainian: Бальзак, romanized: Balzak). He headed a bookstore, known as "Osnova", which provided funds to the group and an underground theatre. At this time, Karavanskyi also came under surveillance by the Romanian Siguranța.

Karavanskyi briefly fled Odesa for Romania in 1944, returning in July of the same year after the Soviet success in the Dnieper–Carpathian offensive. After his return, he tried to reestablish contact with the local OUN underground. After a few days, he was arrested and placed before a military tribunal on charges of bourgeois nationalism. On 7 February 1945 he was found guilty and sentenced to 25 years imprisonment. Karavanskyi fulfilled his sentence at several camps of the Gulag system; he participated in the construction of the Lena Highway and a railway bridge on the Pechora river, worked at a logging camp in Magadan Oblast, mined gold in Kolyma, and worked as a tailor in the Mordovian ASSR.

Following the death and state funeral of Joseph Stalin the conditions of the Gulags began to improve, and Karavanskyi began studying literature. In 1954 he began work on his Dictionary of Ukrainian Rhymes. On 17 September 1955 he was released as part of a wider amnesty on political prisoners, and he returned to Odesa. There, he continued his lexicographical work, additionally working as a labourer in the Komi Autonomous Soviet Socialist Republic, as a translator for The Black Sea Commune newspaper, and as a freelance correspondent for the Ukraine journal.

On 4 September 1965 writer Mykhailo Masiutko was arrested in Feodosia as part of a 1965–1966 Ukrainian purge. The same day, Karavanskyi's Odesa flat was searched by the KGB, although he was not arrested. Karavanskyi protested his treatment at the hands of the authorities, and in response was detained under the pretext that he had not completed the final 8.5 years of his 1945 sentence. He was first sent to Mordovia, and later to Vladimir Central Prison in 1967. During his time at Vladimir Central, Karavanskyi continued to write, publishing via samvydav an article about Soviet involvement in the Katyn massacre. This brought him further attention from Soviet authorities; he was sentenced to five years imprisonment and three years of corrective labour on charges of anti-Soviet agitation in 1969. During his imprisonment, Karavanskyi's Dictionary of Rhymes formed part of the basis for the January 1972 detention of Belgian student Yaroslav Dobosh, which launched a broader purge of Ukrainian intelligentsia.

Karavanskyi was declared a prisoner of conscience by human rights non-governmental organisation Amnesty International, and joined the Ukrainian Helsinki Group in 1979, while imprisoned. That year, he was released, and on 30 November 1979 he left the Soviet Union for the United States alongside his wife, Nina Strokata Karavanska. He was stripped of his Soviet citizenship following his emigration. He continued to work as a journalist for Ukrainian-language publications and as a linguist, living in Denton, Texas.

Karavanskyi died on 17 December 2016, in the city of Baltimore. At the time, he was 95.
