= Vasyl Lisovyi =

Vasyl Lisovyi (Ukrainian: Василь Лісовий, 17 May 1937 – 20 July 2012) was a Ukrainian philosopher and Soviet dissident, known for his role in the organization of samvydav publications during the 1960s. He was persecuted by the KGB and imprisoned in labour camps for his activities.

== Biography ==
Vasyl Lisovyi was born on 17 May 1937 in Stari Bezradychi, Obukhiv Raion, Kyiv Oblast. Coming from a peasant family, after graduating from the faculty of history and philosophy at Kyiv University, Lisovyi initially worked as a lecturer, and later became a fellow of the Institute of Philosophy. In 1971 he defended his thesis on logico-philosophical research of everyday language. He was a fluent speaker of English language.

During the 1960s Lisovyi was active in the organization of underground publishing. A number of his own works were also published illegally. Following the incarceration of Viacheslav Chornovil in 1972, along with Vasyl Ovsiyenko and Yevhen Proniuk Lisovyi edited The Ukrainian Herald, which led to his eventual arrest. Shortly before his detention, Lisovyi had written an open letter to the Communist leadership of Ukraine and whole Soviet Union, protesting against arbitrary arrests of Ukrainian intelligentsia. In 1973 he was sentenced to 7 years of imprisonment in labour camps and 3 years of exile. Next year, during his incarceration in Mordovia, Lisovyi participated in a hunger strike along with Vasyl Stus and several other prisoners.

In July 1983 Lisovyi was liberated from prison, but had to wait 6 years until rehabilitation. In 1989 his degree as candidate of philosophical sciences was restored, and he was able to continue work at the Institute of Philosophy. During his later years, Lisovyi was active as a lecturer, worked on educational materials and published articles dedicated to political science, including an anthology on the topic of nationalism. He also published memoirs dedicated to his experience as a dissident. Vasyl Lisovyi died on 20 July 2012 in Kyiv following a long illness.

== Family ==
His son Oksen Lisovyi served as Minister of Education of Ukraine.
