= Nina Strokata Karavanska =

Ukrainian microbiologist, immunologist, and Soviet dissident (1926–1998)

- Ніна Строката Караванська
- Born: Nina Antonivna Strokata; 31 January 1926; Odesa, Ukrainian SSR, Soviet Union (now Ukraine)
- Died: 2 August 1998 (aged 72); Denton, Texas, United States
- Occupations: Microbiologist and immunologist
- Spouse: Sviatoslav Karavanskyi

Nina Antonivna Karavanska (Note: Ukrainian: Ніна Антонівна Караванська) (née Strokata; (Note: Ukrainian: Строката) 31 January 1926 – 2 August 1998) was a Ukrainian dissident, Soviet microbiologist and immunologist. She was a member of the dissident movement in the USSR, a co-founder of the Ukrainian Helsinki Group and one of the leading human rights activists in Odesa during the Soviet period. She is the author of about 23 scientific papers in the field of clinical microbiology and immunology. She spoke Russian, Ukrainian, English, German, Polish, and Romanian. She was the wife of Sviatoslav Karavanskyi.

== Early life and career ==
Nina Antonivna Strokata was born on 31 January 1926 (according to other sources in 1925) in the Ukrainian city of Odesa, which was then part of the Ukrainian Soviet Socialist Republic within the Soviet Union. After graduating from high school, she entered the Odesa Medical Institute (now - Odesa National Medical University), which she graduated in 1947. In the following years, Strokata worked as a specialist in various Ukrainian cities (including from 1951 to 1952 at the Odesa Medical Institute).

After graduating from the institute, she worked as a junior researcher, an assistant at the Department of Epidemiology, and then an assistant at the Department of Microbiology of the institute. According to the distribution, Nina Strokata was sent to the local district hospital for two years in Tatarbunary Raion, and later as the head of the medical department.

In 1961, Strokata met one of the activists of the Organisation of Ukrainian Nationalists, Sviatoslav Karavanskyi, who at that time had just returned to his homeland after 16 years in prison. He arrived in Odesa after the amnesty. They later married. A year later she returned to Odesa, continued to work at the medical institute. In 1963, she was accepted as a junior researcher at the Central Research Laboratory at the university, where she worked until 1971. At that time she had prepared her PhD thesis. Karavansky resumed his studies at the evening department of the philological faculty of Odesa State University (now the I. I. Mechnikov Odesa State University), and also joined the opposition struggle. He prepared and distributed samizdat in Odesa, and promoted the Ukrainian language. In November 1965, Sviatoslav Yosypovych was arrested for the second time and two days later he was sent without trial to serve a 25-year term. Since then, Nina Karavanska was fighting against the illegal arrests and convictions of her husband, despite the fact that the management of the institute demanded that she give up her husband.

== Dissident movement ==
After her husband was detained, the KGB tried to persuade Nina to denounce Sviatoslav for his actions, but the latter remained with him and did not leave her husband. In December 1966, Nina Karavanska appealed to the head of the camp where her husband was staying, as well as to Leonid Brezhnev, General Secretary of the CPSU Central Committee, and to the French communist newspaper L'Humanité. The petition stated:

"For 18 years, the camp administration has been unable to influence prisoner S.I. Karavansky, and his family is not allowed to maintain contact with him. Therefore, I, the wife of S.I. Karavansky, ask for him to be shot in order to end my husband's many years of suffering and the endless conflicts between Karavansky and the administration."

Despite this request, in April 1970, Sviatoslav Karavansky was sentenced in prison to an additional term of 5 years in prison and 3 years in exile. Attempts to defend the man in court led to the judge issuing a separate decision, which he sent to the Odesa Medical Institute, "to take measures of public influence against Nina Antonovna Strokata in order to instill in her a sense of high patriotic duty as a citizen of the USSR." (Note: Russian: Для принятия мер общественного воздействия в отношении Строкатой Нины Антоновны в целях воспитания у неё чувств высокого патриотического долга как гражданина СССР) The result of this decision was the persecution of Strokata, condemnation of her behavior in the team and in the administration. Prolonged harassment at work ended with her dismissal in May 1971. As Strokata could not get a job in Odesa, she went to the city of Nalchik, where she was hired as a teacher at a medical school. In the autumn of the same year, she exchanged her apartment in Odesa for housing in Nalchik, and on 5 December, she settled there with the family of Yuri-Bohdan Shukhevych.

== Arrest and imprisonment ==
At that time, a doctor, Oleksiy Prytyk, was arrested in Odesa. He admitted that Strokata had brought samizdat from Kyiv and Lviv, and he and Oleksiy Riznikov had distributed it. All three were charged with anti-Soviet agitation, distributing and reading samizdat, and raising funds to help political prisoners. As a result, on 6 December 1971, Strokata was arrested. She was accused of distributing the Ukrainian Herald, samizdat, and writing a letter in defense of Yuli Daniel. In connection with this arrest, Ihor Kalynets and Viacheslav Chornovil set up a Public Committee in Lviv to protect Strokata, which included Vasyl Stus, Leonid Tymchuk, Pyotr Yakir and others. It was the first open human rights organization in Ukraine. But in early 1972, almost all the members of the committee were imprisoned. They managed to publish only two documents - a statement on the establishment of the committee and a bulletin "Who is N.A. Strokata (Karavanska)?" In addition, the American Society of Microbiologists, among others, defended Strokata, and elected her a member.

On 19 May 1972, Karavanska was sentenced under Part 1 of Article 62 of the Criminal Code of the Ukrainian SSR to four years in a maximum security camp on charges of "conducting anti-Soviet agitation and propaganda." The woman was serving her sentence in the women's department of the ZhKh-385/3 camp, located in the village of Barashevo, Tengushevsky District, Mordovia. Even during her nine-month stay in the KGB prison, Karavanska's health deteriorated, and her condition in the camp deteriorated significantly. In captivity, she participated in the hunger strikes of women political prisoners. In particular, Daria Husyak, Nadiya Svitlychna, Iryna Senyk, Iryna Kalynets, Stefania Shabatura, etc. were in the camp with her. Strokata spent the last days of her term in the oncology hospital. At the end of 1975, she was released from a concentration camp with a ban on returning to Ukraine. In response, Strokata renounced Soviet citizenship.

=== Subsequent years ===
After her release, Karavanska settled in Tarusa, Kaluga Oblast, where she was monitored by security forces for a year. Life in the north affected the health of Strokata. So in October of the following year, 1976, she became seriously ill and was taken to a local regional hospital, where she was discharged at her request in November. This decision was due to the desire to go for treatment in the capital's hospital with more experienced staff. Karavanska went to one of these hospitals without asking permission from the police on 20 November and lay there until 4 January of the following year. On 17 January, the court fined the woman 20 Rbls for this violation, and on 3 February, she was again placed under supervision for another six months. In the following years, this term was extended several more times.

As early as 1976, Karavanska became one of the founding members of the Ukrainian Helsinki Group, which was founded by Soviet dissidents to promote the Helsinki Accords. She took an active part in this movement, in particular, all documents and appeals of the group were created with the participation of Karavanska and signed. In addition, she also maintained contact with the Moscow Helsinki Group.

Only then, that is 10 years after the arrest of Sviatoslav Karavansky, was Nina allowed a one-day meeting with her husband. After he was released in 1979, the couple tried to get permission to return to Ukraine, but failed. Fearing another imprisonment of Sviatoslav, who had spent 31 years in concentration camps by that time, the Karavanskys left for Vienna on 30 November of that year. On 11 December, they arrived in the United States, where they settled in Denton, Texas.

There Karavanska spoke, wrote articles, told the Ukrainian diaspora and other Americans the truth about the national liberation movement in Ukraine, organized moral and material support for Soviet prisoners and their families, and conducted public work. There she became a member of the Foreign Representation of the Ukrainian Helsinki Group. In 1980 she published the book "Ukrainian Women in the Soviet Union: Documented Persecution," and in 1981 - "A Family Torn Apart." On 2 August 1998, Nina Antonivna Karavanska-Strokata died in Denton.

== Works ==
Strokata published two books about her public work:

- Ukrainian Women in the Soviet Union: Documented Persecution, is a book about women political prisoners in the USSR which was produced by the publishing house Torch in 1980.
- A Family Torn Apart (1981).

== Legacy ==
On 8 November 2006, President Viktor Yushchenko posthumously awarded Strokata the Order for Courage of the First Degree "for civil courage, devotion in the struggle for the establishment of the ideals of freedom and democracy, and on the occasion of the 30th anniversary of the Ukrainian Public Group to promote the implementation of the Helsinki Accords."
