= Suchasnist =

1961–2013 Ukrainian monthly magazine

- February 1992 issue of Suchasnist, depicting the flag and coat of arms of Ukraine
- Chief editor: Ivan Dziuba (2001–2013)
- Categories: Culture; Literature; Social issues; Visual arts
- Frequency: Monthly
- Country: West Germany (1961–1990); United States (1990–1991); Ukraine (1991–2013)
- Based in: Munich (1961–1990); Newark, New Jersey (1990–1991); Kyiv (1992–2013)
- Language: Ukrainian
- ISSN: 0585-8364

Suchasnist (Ukrainian: Сучасність, lit. 'modernity'; also written as Sučasnist) was a Ukrainian monthly literary and artistic journal published from 1961 to 2013. Founded by members of the Ukrainian diaspora in Munich, West Germany, Suchasnist was frequently smuggled into the Soviet Union and it was generally regarded as one of the preeminent magazines of Ukraine's emerging nationally-conscious population. Following the 1989–1991 Ukrainian revolution and the Declaration of Independence of Ukraine Suchasnist moved its operations to the city of Kyiv. There, it continued to exert significant cultural influence despite financial difficulties until it eventually permanently closed in 2013.

== History ==
Suchasnist was founded by a group of Munich-based intellectuals from the Ukrainian diaspora in January 1961. It combined two existing publications, Ukrainian Literary Newspaper and Modern Ukraine. Although it was closely connected to the Ukrainian Supreme Liberation Council, a committee comprising members of the far-right Organisation of Ukrainian Nationalists and the Ukrainian Insurgent Army, the editorial staff of Suchasnist took an apolitical stance and included diverse public opinions from Ukrainian and Western authors.

The first decade of Suchasnist's existence was dominated by debates regarding interpretation of the Sixtier movement and whether the Ukrainian Soviet Socialist Republic should be recognised as legitimate. Some, such as Mykola Lebed, welcomed the possibility of returning to Ukraine and viewed it as necessary to support the growing Soviet dissident movement, while others, such as Lev Dobriansky, felt that supporting dissidents' movement for human rights was tantamount to recognising Soviet control over Ukraine. The split came to an end after the Ukrainian World Congress and the 21 January 1971 Congress of Ukrainian Free Political Thinking. At the latter event, attended by members of the Organisation of Ukrainian Nationalists Abroad, Ukrainian Revolutionary Democratic Party, and Ukrainian National Democratic Alliance, it was determined that the Ukrainian SSR represented the only existing Ukrainian organ and that all efforts should be undertaken to help the Sixtiers. By the time of the Second Ukrainian World Congress in Toronto in 1973, all political parties in the Ukrainian diaspora, including the radical Banderite wing of the OUN under Yaroslav Stetsko's leadership, had come to support such a position.

During the Soviet period Suchasnist was frequently smuggled into the Soviet Union with explicit support and funding from the United States government, and it was read by nationally-minded members of the Ukrainian intelligentsia. Similarly, dissident material was smuggled out of the Soviet Union to West Germany, where it was published in Suchasnist. Among the Ukrainian dissidents who had their works published in Suchasnist during this time period were Viacheslav Chornovil, Ivan Dziuba, Levko Lukianenko, Yevhen Sverstiuk, and Vasyl Symonenko. In addition to literary and artistic works, Suchasnist published samvydav, criticism of the Russification of Ukraine, works banned in the Soviet Union, and political works.

Suchasnist moved from Munich to Newark, New Jersey in 1990. The next year, Ukraine became independent. Suchasnist returned to Europe, moving to the Ukrainian capital of Kyiv by the publication of its January 1992 issue. Within independent Ukraine the journal's status as a leading intellectual voice continued despite growing financial difficulties. Ivan Dziuba became the chief editor in 2001, having previously served as co-chief editor from 1992.

Financial difficulties became increasingly poor from 2008, and Suchasnist temporarily stopped publication on three occasions. On 25 April 2012, during a press conference, chief editor Taras Fediuk announced that the journal would resume publication after a year and a half hiatus as part of an agreement with the Heritage-Integral publishing house. Five issues were published before the company abandoned the magazine, stating that the magazine was unable to make a profit and that additional funding in the form of grants or donations could not be acquired. Suchasnist released its final issue in January 2013.

== List of chief editors ==
- Ivan Koshelivets (1961–1967)
- Wolfram Burghardt (1967–1970)
- Bohdan Kravtsiv (1970–1976)
- Ivan Koshelivets (1976–1977)
- Marta Skorupsky (1977–1978)
- George Shevelov (1978–1981)
- Marta Skorupsky (1981–1983)
- Taras Hunczak (1984–2001)
- Ivan Dziuba (2001–2013) (Note: Co-chief editor from 1992.)
- Ihor Rymaruk (2001–2008)
- Taras Fediuk (2009–2010, 2012–2013)
