= Vilkhivka, Ivano-Frankivsk Oblast =

Village in Ivano-Frankivsk Oblast, Ukraine

Vilkhivka Вільхівка
- Village
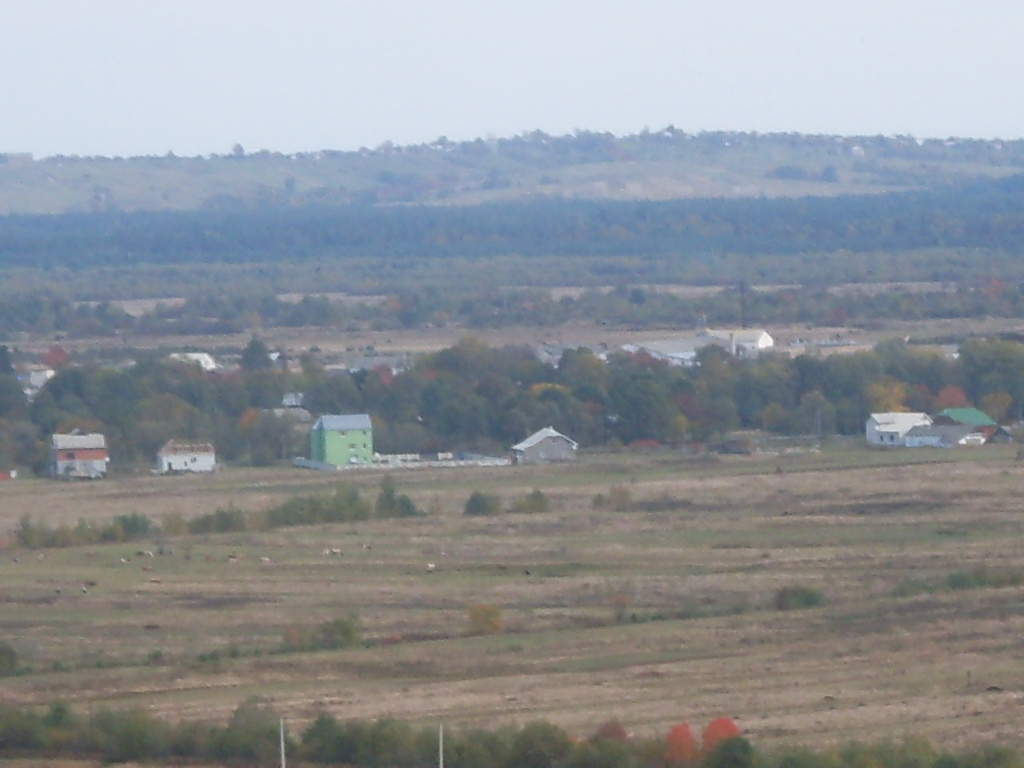

- Location of Vilkhivka Vilkhivka (Ukraine)
- Coordinates: 48°51′05″N 24°11′12″E
- Country: Ukraine
- Oblast: Ivano-Frankivsk Oblast
- Raion: Kalush Raion
- Elevation: 437 m (1,434 ft)

Population (2001)
  - Total: 637
- Time zone: UTC+2
  - Summer (DST): UTC+3
- Postal code: 77666
- Area code: +380 3474

Vilkhivka (Ukrainian: Вільхівка) is a village in the Kalush Raion, Ivano-Frankivsk Oblast (province) of northern Ukraine.

== Demographics ==
Native language as of the Ukrainian Census of 2001:

- Ukrainian 99.53%
- Others 0.47%
