= Ivane-Zolote =

Rural locality in Ternopil Oblast, Ukraine

Ivane-Zolote Іване-Золоте
- Location in Ternopil Oblast
- Coordinates: 48°43′12″N 25°38′5″E
- Country: Ukraine
- Oblast: Ternopil Oblast
- Raion: Chortkiv Raion
- Hromada: Zalishchyky urban hromada
- Time zone: UTC+2 (EET)
  - Summer (DST): UTC+3 (EEST)
- Postal code: 48676

Ivane-Zolote (Ukrainian: Іване-Золоте) is a village in Zalishchyky urban hromada, Chortkiv Raion, Ternopil Oblast, Ukraine.

== History ==
Ivane-Zolote was first mentioned in writings in 1349.

After the liquidation of the Zalishchyky Raion on 19 July 2020, the village became part of the Chortkiv Raion.

== Religion ==
- Saint Nicholas church (1895; brick).

== Famous people ==
- Stefaniia Shabatura (1938–2014), Ukrainian textile artist and human rights activist
- Ivan Palahniuk, Ukrainian emigrant to the United States, father of Jack Palance

== Sources ==
- (in Ukrainian) Дубецький І., Олійник В., Уніят В., Іване-Золоте // Ternopil Encyclopedic Dictionary: in 4 v. / editorial board: H. Yavorskyi and other, Ternopil: "Zbruch", 2004, V. 1: А—Й, 696 s. — ISBN 966-528-197-6.
- "Iwanie (2)". Geographical Dictionary of the Kingdom of Poland (in Polish). 3. Warszawa: Kasa im. Józefa Mianowskiego. 1882. p. 311.
