= Ihor Kalynets =

Ukrainian poet and Soviet dissident (1939–2025)

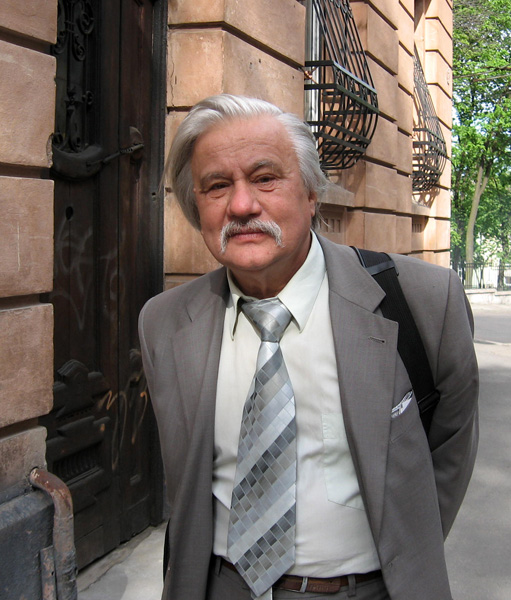
Kalynets in 2007

Ihor Myronovych Kalynets (Ukrainian: Ігор Миронович Калинець; 9 July 1939 – 28 June 2025) was a Ukrainian poet and Soviet dissident.

== Background ==
Kalynets was born in Khodoriv, the son of an agronomist. His parents upheld Ukrainian cultural traditions. As a child, Kalynets read banned literature in the Ukrainian language, and watched the mass deportations of Ukrainians by the communists. He graduated from Lviv University in 1961. He began writing in the 1950s, and his first book of poetry was published in 1966. Because of censorship, the rest of his works were published in the West.

== Writing ==
One of the main themes of Kalynets's poetry is cultural glorification. Much of his writing uses a vocabulary full of cultural allusions. His work reflects his pride in Ukrainian culture and the country's ancient pagan and early Christian heritage. In Kupalo's Fire (1966), Kalynets connects the country's folklore and ancient traditions to modern, Soviet life. Most of his works do not contain glaring political criticisms, rather unexpressed denunciation. He drew strong influence from Bohdan Ihor Antonych and dedicated one of his poems to him. He also dedicated poems to various Ukrainian cultural icons, including Taras Shevchenko, filmmaker Alexander Dovzhenko, and composer Stanislav Liudkevych among others. He refused to dedicate any poems to the Soviet leaders, breaking from the custom which was typical among poets in that time.

== Arrest ==
As a "Ukrainian bourgeois nationalist", opposed to the policies of Russification and general Soviet lawlessness, he was sentenced to nine years in a labour camp and exile. His wife, Iryna, was arrested in January 1972. Kalynets refused to cooperate with the KGB and began behaving in a defiant manner.

In March 1971, the 24th Congress of the Communist Party of Ukraine denounced Kalynets' poetry as "reprehensible", made worse by the fact that he allowed his work to be published in the West. He was then indicted on the grounds that he "issues a veiled appeal to struggle against the Soviet government", "calls for a revival of the Uniate Church", "covertly presents the idea that the Ukrainian people are oppressed by the Soviet government", and "articulates a nationalist ideology, as well as nostalgia for the past and for an independent state". On 11 August 1972, he was arrested, and on 15 November 1972, he was convicted for anti-Soviet activities by a closed court and sentenced to six years in labour camps and three years in exile. He served out his sentences in the Perm political labour camps, first at No. 35 at Vsechsvyatskaya, but he was then moved to No. 36 in the village of Kutchino, Perm Region. While in prison, he took part in the resistance movement. He was involved with hunger strikes, the writing of appeals and the writing of chronicles of the two camps. After being released from prison in 1981, he worked in the Lviv Academy of Sciences of the Ukrainian SSR library.

== Personal life and death ==
Kalynets was married to poet and fellow dissident Iryna Kalynets (died 31 July 2012, aged 72), who also actively opposed the suppression of the Ukrainian Greek Catholic Church and was a professor of Ukrainian language and literature at the Lviv Polytechnic. She was sentenced to six years of hard labor. He died on 28 June 2025, at the age of 85.

== Honors ==
- 1992: Shevchenko Prize
- 1997: Antonovych prize
- Member of the Order of Liberty (2009)

== Collections of poetry ==
- Kupalo's Fire (1966)
- Poetry from Ukraine (1970)
- Summing up Silence (1971)
- The Crowning of a Scarecrow (1972) translated into German in 1975
- The Awakened Muse (1991)
