= Iryna Kalynets =

Soviet-Ukrainian writer and human rights activist

- Ірина Калинець
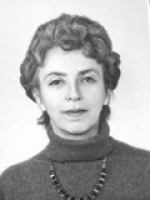
- Iryna Kalynets as a deputy at Verkhovna Rada of Ukraine
- Born: Iryna Onufriyivna Stasiv; 6 December 1940; Lviv, Ukrainian SSR, Soviet Union
- Died: 31 July 2012 (aged 71); Lviv, Ukraine
- Citizenship: Soviet Union (1940–1991) → Ukraine (1991–2012)
- Education: Lviv University
- Occupation: poetry
- Movement: dissident movement in the Soviet Union
- Spouse: Ihor Kalynets
- Awards

Iryna Onufriyivna Kalynets (Ukrainian: Іри́на Ону́фріївна Калине́ць, née Stasiv (Стасів); 6 December 1940 – 31 July 2012) was a Ukrainian poet, writer, activist and Soviet dissident during the 1970s. Kalynets was the wife of another Soviet dissident, Ihor Kalynets.

== Childhood ==
Iryna Kalynets was born in a Christian family of the Ukrainian Greek Catholic Church, who was exiled at the time of the USSR. Her father was Onufrii Ivanovych Stasiv, a worker from the Bratkovychi village, Horodotsky district. Her mother was Hanna Dmytrivna Stasiv (née Petyk) from a peasant family in the Malnivska Volya village, Mosty district. Among the relatives of Iryna Stasiv were people connected with the OUN. In the post-war years, she observed the mass deportation of Ukrainians to Siberia. From her childhood, Stasiv-Kalynets recalled, "At school, they spat at the holiest things; at home, all was explained in whispers."

== Life and career ==
Kalynets attended Lviv secondary school No. 87 from 1947–1957. After graduating, she worked in production for two years. Kalynets studied Slavic Philology at the Ivan Franko National University of Lviv. In 1964, she worked as a methodologist at the regional House of Folk Creativity and as a teacher, librarian, and lecturer of Ukrainian language and literature at the Lviv Polytechnic National University. There, she published poems for children in periodicals. She associated with the "shistedesyatnyky" or Sixtiers and published a banned human rights journal Український Вісник.

== Political activism ==
In July 1970, she signed a petition against the arrest of Valentyn Moroz. In the fall of the same year, together with her husband, Ihor Kalynets, she sent a petition to the Prosecutor's Office of the Ukrainian SSR requesting to be allowed to be present at the trial of V. Moroz. In her lecturer position, she defended Valentyn Moroz, Nina Karavanska, Vasyl Stus, and other persecuted cultural figures. She was fired from her job. Kalynets continued her dissident actions.

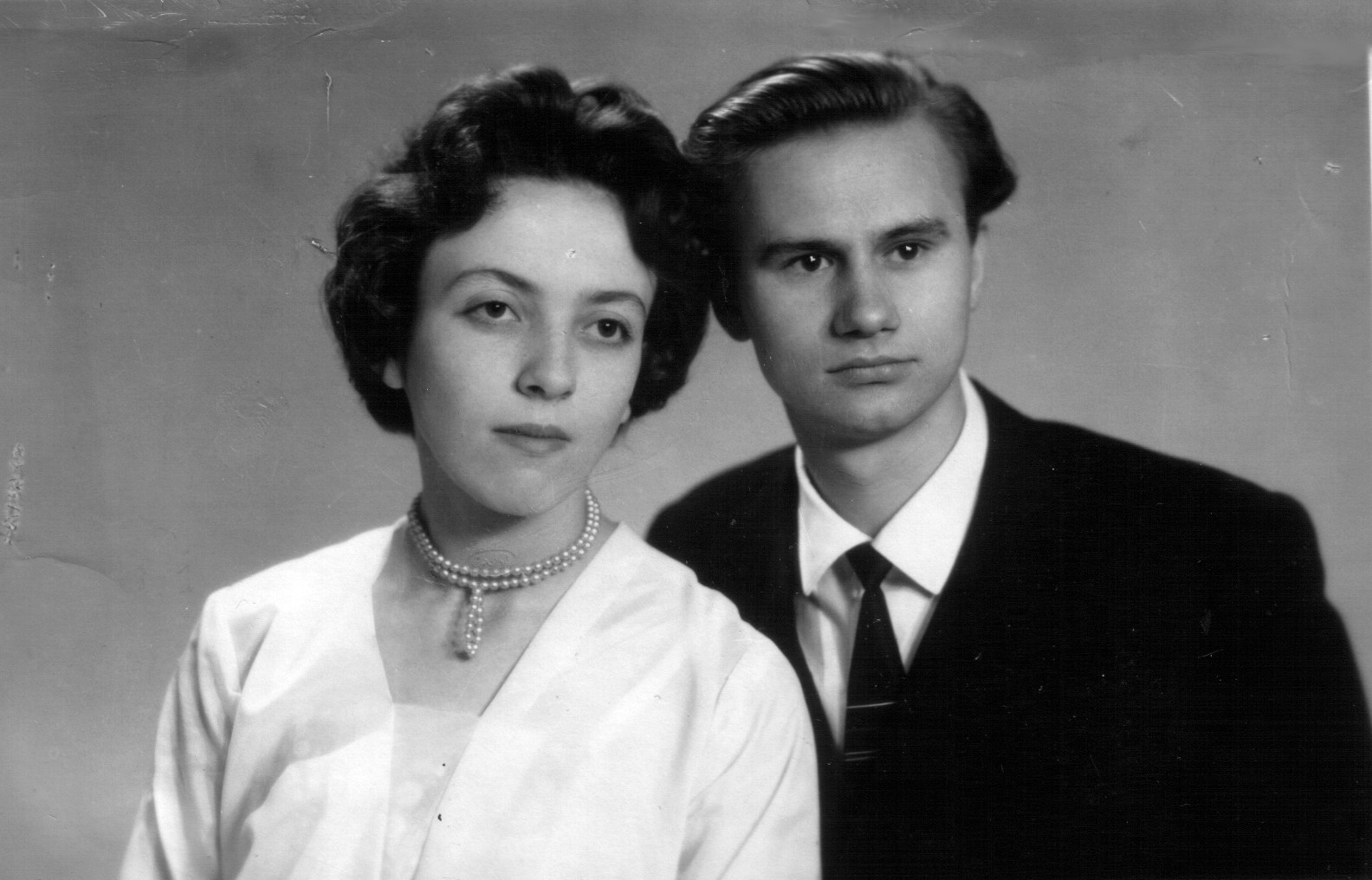
Iryna and Ihor Kalynets in 1961

On January 12, 1972, she was arrested and sentenced to 6 years of imprisonment in strict regime camps (Barashevo, Mordovia) and 3 years of exile (Undino-Poselie, Transbaikal Krai). Six months later, her husband, Ihor Kalynets, received the same sentence. Their daughter was left alone for nine years. During her imprisonment, Kalynets announced hunger strikes in support of other prisoners and sent telegrams with protests to various institutions of the USSR. She was allowed to go back from her exile in 1981.

After being released, she returned to Lviv and organized several dissident societies and new educational institutions. A proponent of the Ukrainian independence movement, she soon joined Memorial and Rukh, a pair of civil rights organizations. Kalynets also carried out school system reform emphasizing the Ukrainian language and culture and contributed to the legalization of UGCC temples despite USSR prosecution. In 1990, Iryna Kalynets was elected a deputy of the Verkhovna Rada of Ukraine, where she continued to work on educational issues.

Iryna Kalynets died from a long illness on 31 July 2012, at the age of 71.

== Major works and style ==
Kalynets’ poetry combines artistic thought with political engagement. In author interviews, she described the lyrical self of her characters as an “aesthetic expression of human existence in psychological and physical tension.” She maintained that “literature and politics go side by side without competing with each other.” Kalynets’ poetry follows a clear set of principles, focusing on elevating Ukrainian voices under the oppressive USSR regime.

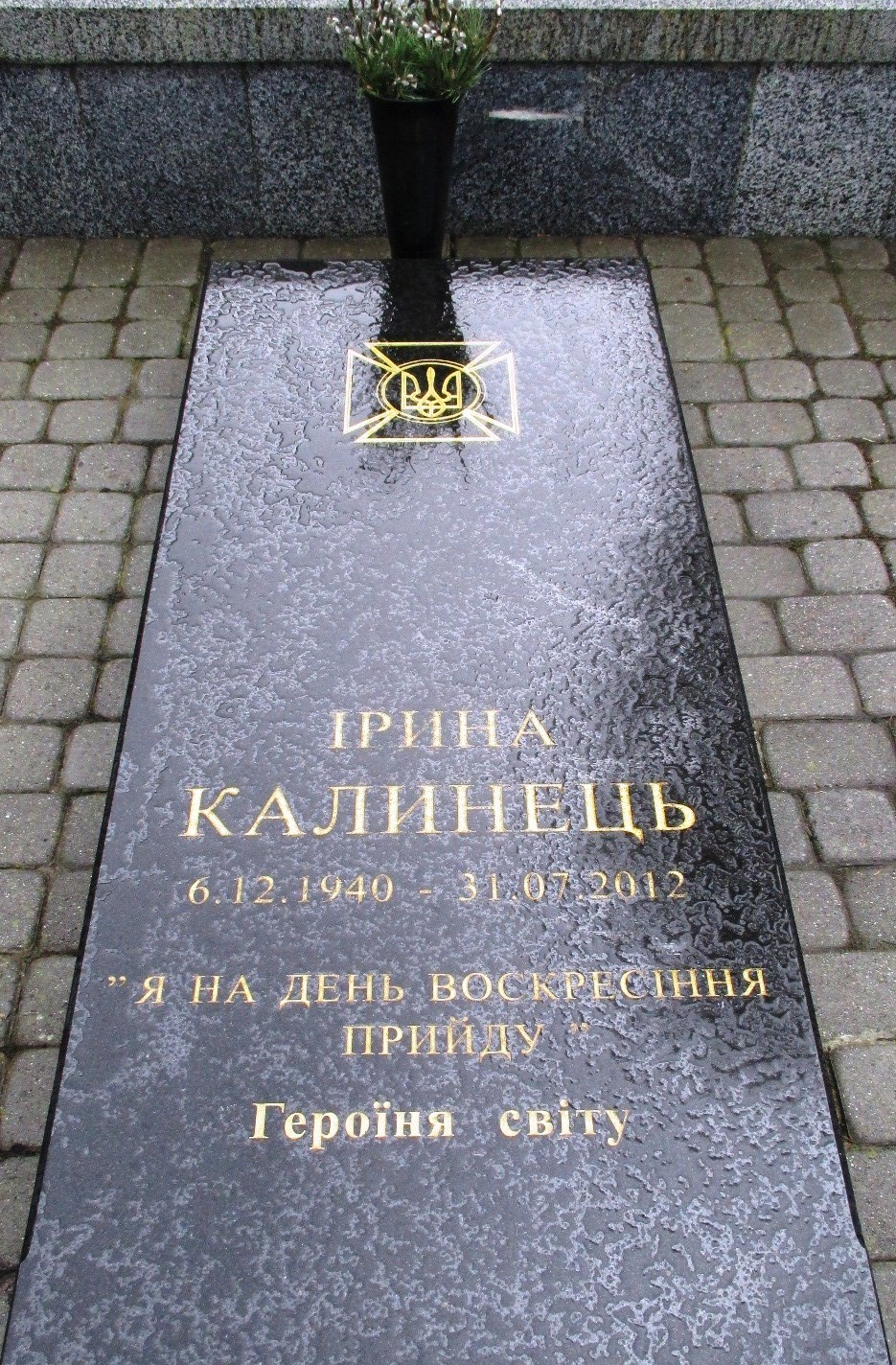
Iryna Kalynets' grave

Her collections “Oranta,” “The Exile Road,” and “The Last of the Lamenters” combine themes of morality, Christian sacrifice, and opposition to indifference. Kalynets’ portrayal of the Ukrainian nation takes root from the past history and the present events; she assesses the gains and losses of Ukraine’s continuous fight for independence. Together with her husband, she published a collection of spiritual poetry, “Here we are, Lord” (1993), and prose, “Praying to the distant stars” (1997; both – Lviv). The latter included her detective novel, “The Murder of a Thousand Years Ago” (separate edition – Lviv, 2002), based on Kyiv Rus’ history studies.

== Awards ==
- In 1998, she was recognized as a “Heroine of the World” (USA, Rochester) for her social activism, and in 2000, she was awarded the Order of Princess Olga III degree.
- On December 25, 2015, a memorial plaque in her honor was unveiled on the facade of the building of Lviv secondary school No. 87, where Iryna Kalynets studied from 1947–1957.
- On December 21, 2017, Lviv secondary comprehensive school No. 87 was named after Iryna Kalynets by the decision of the Lviv City Council.
- On June 30, 2022, the former Karl Bryullov street in the Frankivskyi district of Lviv was named in honor of Iryna Kalynets.
