= Yevhen Proniuk =

Ukrainian human rights activist and politician (1936–2023)

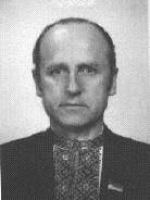
- Official portrait, 1994

People's Deputy of Ukraine
- In office 11 May 1994 – 12 May 1998

Personal details
- Born: 26 September 1936 Chomiakówka, Stanisławów Voivodeship, Poland
- Died: 21 August 2023 (aged 86) Kyiv, Ukraine
- Party: Republican Party of Ukraine
- Education: Taras Shevchenko National University of Kyiv
- Occupation: Human rights activist

Yevhen Vasyliovych Pronyuk (Ukrainian: Євге́н Васи́льович Проню́к; 26 September 1936 – 21 August 2023) was a Ukrainian human rights activist and politician. A member of the Republican Party of Ukraine, he served in the Verkhovna Rada from 1994 to 1998.

Pronyuk died in Kyiv on 21 August 2023, at the age of 86.
