= Mykhaylo Osadchy =

- Born: March 22, 1936; Kurmany, Nedryhailiv Raion, Sumy Oblast, UkSSR
- Died: July 5, 1994 (aged 58); Lviv, Ukraine
- Occupations: writer, poet
- Writing career
- Language: Ukrainian

Mykhaylo Osadchy (Ukrainian: Осадчий Михайло Григорович; March 22, 1936, in Kurmany, Nedryhailiv Raion, Sumy Oblast, UkSSR – July 5, 1994, in Lviv, Lviv Oblast, Ukraine) was a Ukrainian journalist, poet, writer, and dissident.

Mykhaylo Osadchy graduated from Lviv University in 1958. He taught there from 1960 to 1965. He was arrested in 1965, spent 8 months waiting for a court decision and was finally sentenced to two years' imprisonment in 1966. He was tried together with Mykhailo Horyn, Horyn's brother Bohdan Horyn, and M. Zvarychevska.

Osadchy was arrested for the second time January 1972. That September he was sentenced to seven years of labour camp and three years of exile.

He was able to return to teaching at Lviv University in 1990. In 1992, Osadchy became a member of the Writer's Union of Ukraine.

== Literary works ==
Osadchy's first book of poetry, 'The Moonlit Field' (Ukrainian: Місячне поле), was published in 1965 before his arrest. In 1971 his memoir 'Cataract' (Ukrainian: Більмо), was published. It was translated into French in 1974 and into English by Marco Carynnyk in 1976. His second collection of poems was published in 1979 and was called 'Quos ego'. The third one, 'The Scythian Altar' (Ukrainian: Скифський вівтар), was published in 1990.

== Bibliography ==
- M. Osadchy. Misyachne pole [Moonlit field].— Kamenyar, Lviv, 1965
- M. Osadchy. Bilmo: Avtobiohrafichny narys [Cataract. An autobiographical portrait] — Paris – Baltimore: Smoloskyp 1971
- M. Osadchy. Zustrich z vozhdem [Meeting with the leader] // Ukrainsky visnyk, 1987, No.8.— pp. 18–25.
