= Ivan Dziuba =

Soviet Ukrainian writer and dissident (1931–2022)

Hero of Ukraine Ivan Dziuba
- Іван Дзюба
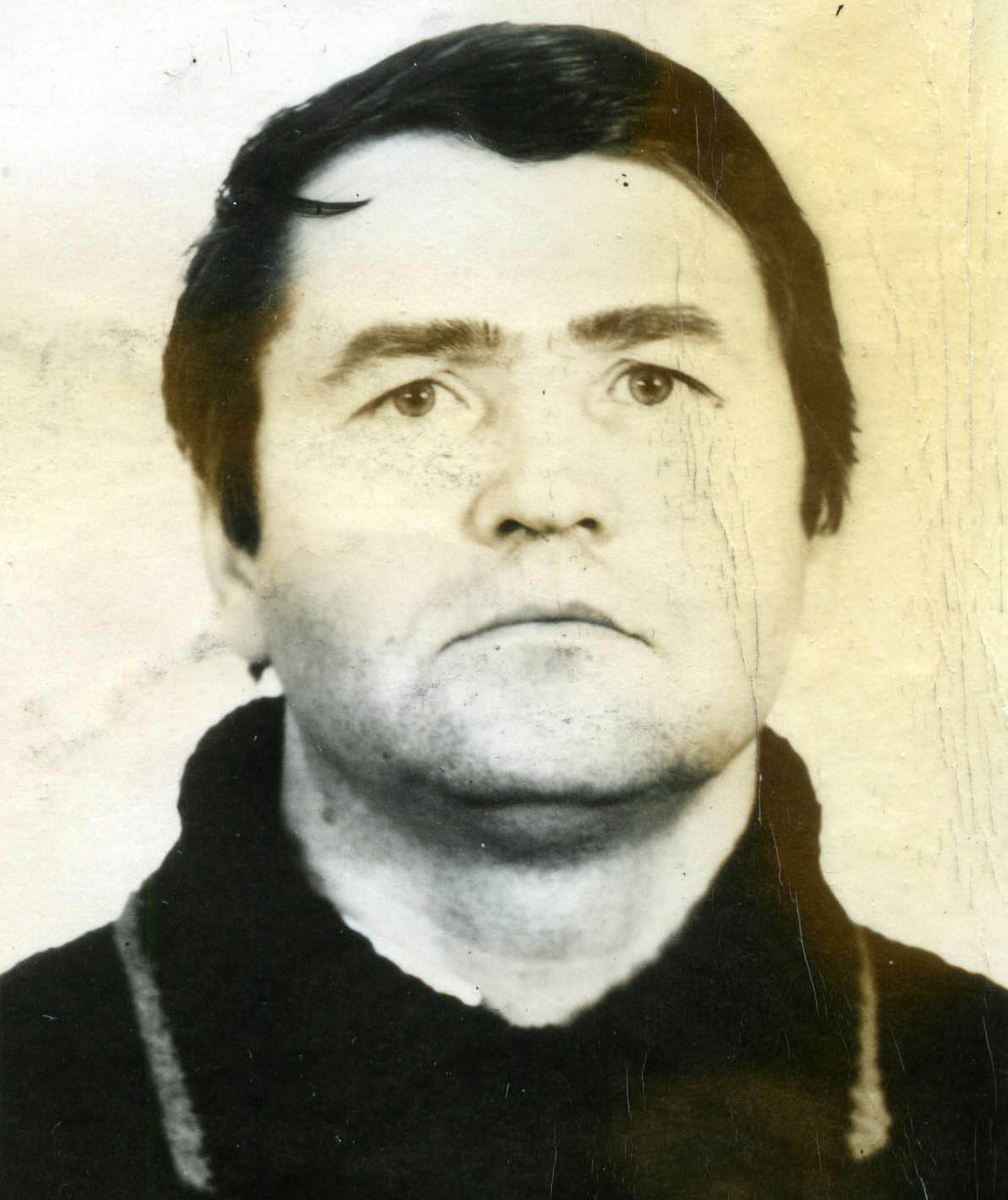
- Dziuba in 1973

Minister of Culture of Ukraine
- In office 17 November 1992 – 19 August 1994
- President: Leonid Kravchuk
- Prime Minister: Leonid Kuchma; Vitaliy Masol
- Preceded by: Larysa Khorolets
- Succeeded by: Dmytro Ostapenko

Personal details
- Born: 26 July 1931 Mykolaivka, Ukrainian SSR, Soviet Union
- Died: 22 February 2022 (aged 90) Kyiv, Ukraine
- Awards: Order of State Member of the Order of Liberty; Order of Prince Yaroslav the Wise, 5th class

Ivan Mykhailovych Dziuba (Ukrainian: Іван Михайлович Дзюба; 26 July 1931 – 22 February 2022) was a Ukrainian literary critic, social activist, and Soviet dissident. Honoured as a Hero of Ukraine in 2001, Dziuba was an academic of National Academy of Sciences of Ukraine, the second Minister of Culture of Ukraine (1992—1994), and head of the committee for Shevchenko National Prize (1999–2001).

Dziuba was the editor in chief of the magazine The Contemporary (Ukrainian: «Сучасність») and during the 1990s was a member of the editorial boards of scientific magazines Kyiv Antiquity (Ukrainian: «Київська старовина»), Word and Time («Слово і час»), Euroatlantic («Євроатлантика»), and others. He was also the Co-Chief of editorial board of the Encyclopedia of Modern Ukraine.

== Biography ==
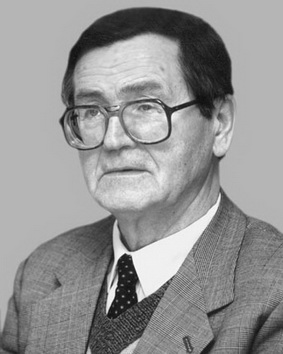
Dziuba in 2004

Born into a peasant family, Dziuba spoke Russian language until 17 years of age. In 1932, his family, fleeing from the famine, moved from their home village to the nearby workers' village Novotroyits'ke for a short time. Later, they moved to Olenevski Quarry (now Dokuchaievsk), where Dziuba finished secondary school No. 1. He graduated from Donetsk Pedagogical Institute, and pursued postgraduate studies in the Shevchenko Institute of Literature. His work was first published in 1959.

As a representative of Ukrainian writers from the Sixtiers generation, in September 1966 Dziuba delivered a speech at an unsanctioned memorial meeting near the site of Babyn Yar massacre in Kyiv. He underlined the need to fight against antisemitism and called both Jews and Ukrianians for reconciliation. Viktor Nekrasov and Borys Antonenko-Davydovych also spoke at the event, as a result of which the KGB accused all three of "nationalism" and put them under increased surveillance.

At the end of 1965, Dziuba wrote his work Internationalism or Russification?, first published in London in 1968 and re-published in 1990 in the 5–7 issues of Motherland magazine (Ukrainian: Вітчизна), dealing with the problems threatening national relations in socialist society, which he sent to the Soviet Communist authorities. A special commission of the Central Committee of the Communist Party of Ukraine inspected the text and decided that it was "lampoons on the Soviet reality, the national policy of the CPSU and the practice of communist construction in the USSR". Authorities accused Dziuba of undermining Soviet friendship of peoples, and fueling hatred between the Ukrainian and Russian peoples. In 1972, he was sentenced to 5 years in prison and 5 years in exile. Later, he asked for pardon and after 18 months in prison he was pardoned and hired to work at the newspaper of Antonov Serial Production Plant.

After the change of political situation in the Soviet Union and transition to the independent Ukraine, Dziuba became a co-founder of the People's Movement of Ukraine. Beginning in 1991, Dziuba was the head publisher of the Suchasnist magazine. He was a laureate of the Shevchenko Prize, O. Biletsky Prize, Antonovich Fund International Prize, and Volodymyr Vernadsky Prize. During his latter years he condemned the attempts to politicize the Babyn Yar memorial site. Dziuba died in Kyiv on 22 February 2022, at the age of 90. In December 2022, a street in Kyiv was named after him.

== Awards ==
- Order of Prince Yaroslav the Wise 5th class, 22 January 2022.
- Order of Liberty, 16 January 2009.
- Hero of Ukraine, 26 July 2001.

== See also ==
- Andriy Skaba

== Bibliography ==
- Ivan Dzyuba entries (1968-1979), CCE Name Index
- Дисидентський рух в Україні
- Мирослав Попович. Перевідкривач: до 70-річчя Івана Дзюби // Дзеркало тижня
- Юрій Шаповал. Досвітній вогонь. У 1965 році з'явився всесвітньо відомий памфлет Івана Дзюби «Інтернаціоналізм чи русифікація?» // Дзеркало тижня
- Сюндюков Ігор. Тривожний ювілей. В українському домі відзначали 40-у річницю з часу оприлюднення знаменитої праці Івана Дзюби «Інтернаціоналізм чи русифікація?» // День
- Довідник «Хто є хто в Україні». - К.: К.І.С.
- Письменницький довідник // Національна спілка письменників України

Cultural offices
Preceded by Volodymyr Yavorivsky	Shevchenko National Prize Committee Chair; 1999 – 2005	Succeeded by Roman Lubkivsky
Government offices
Preceded by Larysa Khorolets	Minister of Culture; 1992 – 1994	Succeeded by Dmytro Ostapenko as Minister of Culture and Arts
