= Valentyn Moroz =

Ukrainian politician

Valentyn Yakovych Moroz (Ukrainian: Валенти́н Я́кович Моро́з; 15 April 1936 – 16 April 2019) was a Ukrainian writer and political prisoner. His resistance to persecution by the communist authorities made him a popular hero, particularly with the Ukrainian diaspora in Canada, but after he was expelled from the USSR, his militant nationalism, and his private life, made him a controversial figure.

== Early life ==
Moroz was born into a peasant family in the Volyn region of Ukraine. He won a place to study history at Lviv University, but obtained poor grades because he failed to give satisfactory answers when tested on the history of the USSR. After graduation, he worked as a teacher in a rural school, then at the Ivano-Frankivsk Teacher Training Institute.

== First Arrest ==
On 1 September 1965, Moroz was arrested after giving a talk at the pedagogical institute in which he argued that Ukraine should be recognised as a nation state, with the same status as Poland or Czechoslovakia. He was charged with ‘anti-Soviet agitation’ and sentenced to four years in the gulag. As a punishment for complaining about conditions in the labour camp, he was transferred to Vladimir Prison in December 1966 and held there in solitary confinement for six months. In 1968, he was investigated as the suspected author of A Report from the Beria Reservation, a graphic account of conditions in the labour camps, but authorities could not prove that it was his work.

Released when his four-year sentence came to an end, Moroz returned to Ivano-Frankovsk, and wrote several essays which were circulated in samizdat. In one, Amid the Snows, he defended what he called the "1ívíng example of heroic civic conduct”, insisting that dissidents should be prepared to accept personal sacrifice, which was an implied criticism of his fellow dissident Ivan Dziuba, who had recanted to avoid expulsion from the Writers’ Union. In another, Moses and Dathan, he asserted that people should believe that 'their nation has been chosen by God and their people are the highest product of history".

A practising Christian, Moroz risked arrest in May 1970 by tape-recording a mass in a village church which was scheduled to be turned into a museum, but was protected from the police by local inhabitants.

== Second Arrest ==
Moroz was arrested again on 1 June 1970, for his authorship of works circulating in samizdat, including A Report From the Beria Reservation. He was arraigned at a closed trial in Ivano-Frankovsk in November 1970. A dozen supporters risked arrest by turning up in the courtroom, but were not allowed in. Four witnesses were summoned, but three, including Dziuba and Viacheslav Chornovil, refused to testify unless the trial was held in public. Moroz was sentenced to six years in prison, three years in labour camps, and five in exile.

In summer 1972, Moroz was placed in a cell with two violent criminals who taunted him, deprived him of sleep, and, in July, stabbed him in the stomach. He was then placed in solitary confinement, supposedly for his own protection. In July 1974, fearing that his prolonged isolation might drive him insane, he began a hunger strike ‘to the death’. For five months, he was kept alive by forced feeding, until, in November 1974, he was moved to a cell with another, educated prisoner.

The severity of the sentence roused international protests, in a large part because of his wife Raisa, who passed information about his treatment to foreign correspondents, and wrote letters appealing for support from abroad, despite threats from the KGB that she, too, might be arrested.

When his prison terms ended in 1976, Moroz was sent to a labour camp in Mordvinia, where he was accused by other prisoners of inciting Ukrainians against Russian and Jewish prisoners. His alleged anti-semitism presented a serious problem for the movement for democracy in Ukraine because his name was so well known abroad.

== Exile in Canada ==
In April 1979, two months before his term in a labour camp was due to end, Moroz was removed and put on a plane to Kennedy airport, New York, with four other political prisoners who were being exchanged for two former United Nations employees convicted of spying. In June, he settled in Canada, where he worked as a journalist, and where he was greeted as a hero. When his plane arrived at Winnipeg airport 2,000 people were there to greet him, and the deputy mayor, William Norrie, declared that 11 June was ‘Valentyn Moroz Day’.

This initial enthusiasm, and hero worship, did not last. Moroz’s political utterances, for instance his view that Ukrainian independence should be secured by any possible means, including guerrilla war, appealed to supporters of the former guerrilla leader Stepan Bandera, but not to other sections of Canada’s Ukrainian diaspora. After the Ukrainian former political prisoner Leonid Plyushch had asserted that Ukraine needed “democracy, not fascism”, Moroz dismissed him as an “underdeveloped Ukrainian – a Jew.”

In September 1979, Moroz’s wife, Raisa, arrived in Canada, but they soon separated, and he publicly accused her of being a KGB agent, and of wanting all his money as alimony.

== Final Years ==
Moroz returned to Ukraine in January 1991, just before the collapse of communism, and settled in Lviv, where he worked as an academic.

== Published Works ==
Valentyn Moroz's early works, as well as documents concerning his legal case, were published in several collections, and also translated into English, including A Chronicle of Resistance in Ukraine (1971), Boomerang: The Works of Valentyn Moroz, (1974), Report from the Beria Reservation: The Protest Writings of Valentyn Moroz (1974), Esei, lysty, documenty (Essays, Letters, Documents, 1979).
