= Mykhailo Horyn =

Soviet-Ukrainian human rights activist and politician

- Михайло Горинь
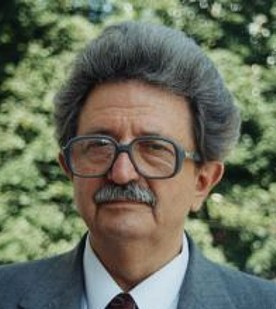

People's Deputy of Ukraine
- In office 15 May 1990 – 10 May 1994

Personal details
- Born: 17 June 1930 Kniselo, Second Polish Republic (now Ukraine)
- Died: 13 January 2013 (aged 82) Lviv, Ukraine
- Party: People's Movement of Ukraine
- Spouse: Olha
- Children: Oksana (b. 1964), Taras (b. 1972)
- Occupation: Human rights activist; politician
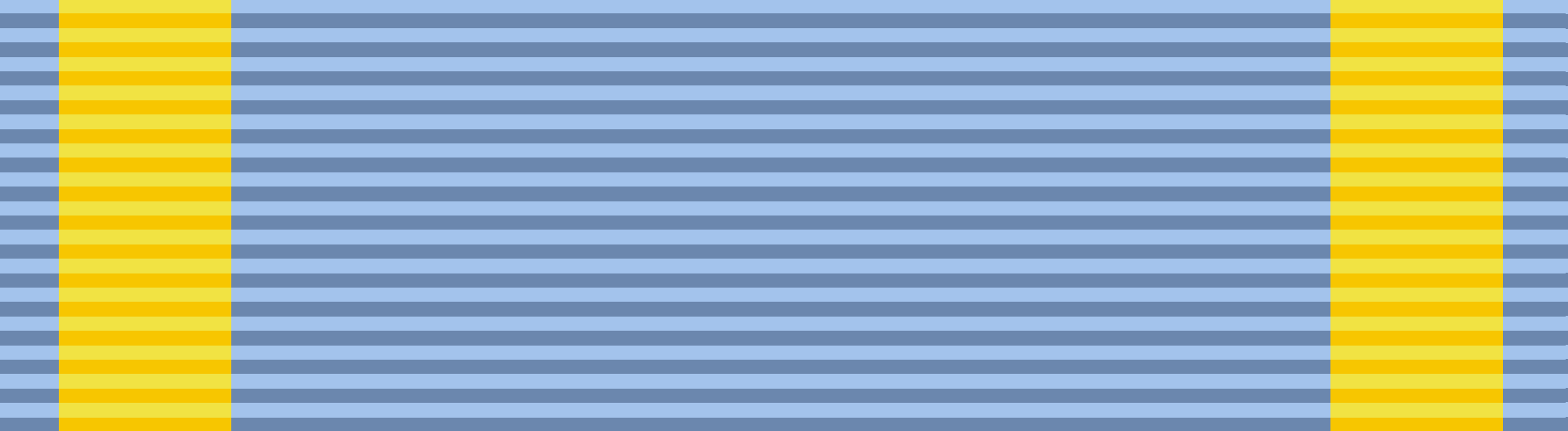
- Awards: Member of the Order of Liberty

Mykhailo Mykolayovych Horyn (Ukrainian: Михайло Миколайович Горинь; 17 June 1930 – 13 January 2013) was a Ukrainian human rights activist, Soviet dissident, and politician. He was a People's Deputy of Ukraine in the first convocation of the Verkhovna Rada, from 15 May 1990 to 10 May 1994. He played an important role in the country's struggle for independence. In the 1980s he was held as a political prisoner in the special-regime unit of Perm-36.

Regarding Russian-Ukrainian relations, he said, "Our historical mission is to be the doctor who will cure Russia of its imperial ambition. Ukraine is a European power. Russia is not. It is a Eurasian power. It is sitting on top of the Ural Mountains, looking East and trying to decide how to tackle its problems".

He was the elder brother of Ukrainian Soviet dissidents Bohdan (b. 1936) and Mykola Horyn (b. 1945).

== Awards ==
- Order of Liberty (January 16, 2009)
- Order of Prince Yaroslav the Wise 5th class (June 14, 2000)
- Order of Merit 2nd class (November 26, 2005)
- Order of Merit 3rd class (August 19, 1998)
- Order for Courage 1st class (November 8, 2006)

== See also ==
- Ivan Drach, Ukrainian dissident
