= Starobilsk =

City in Luhansk Oblast, Ukraine

Starobilsk Старобільськ
- City
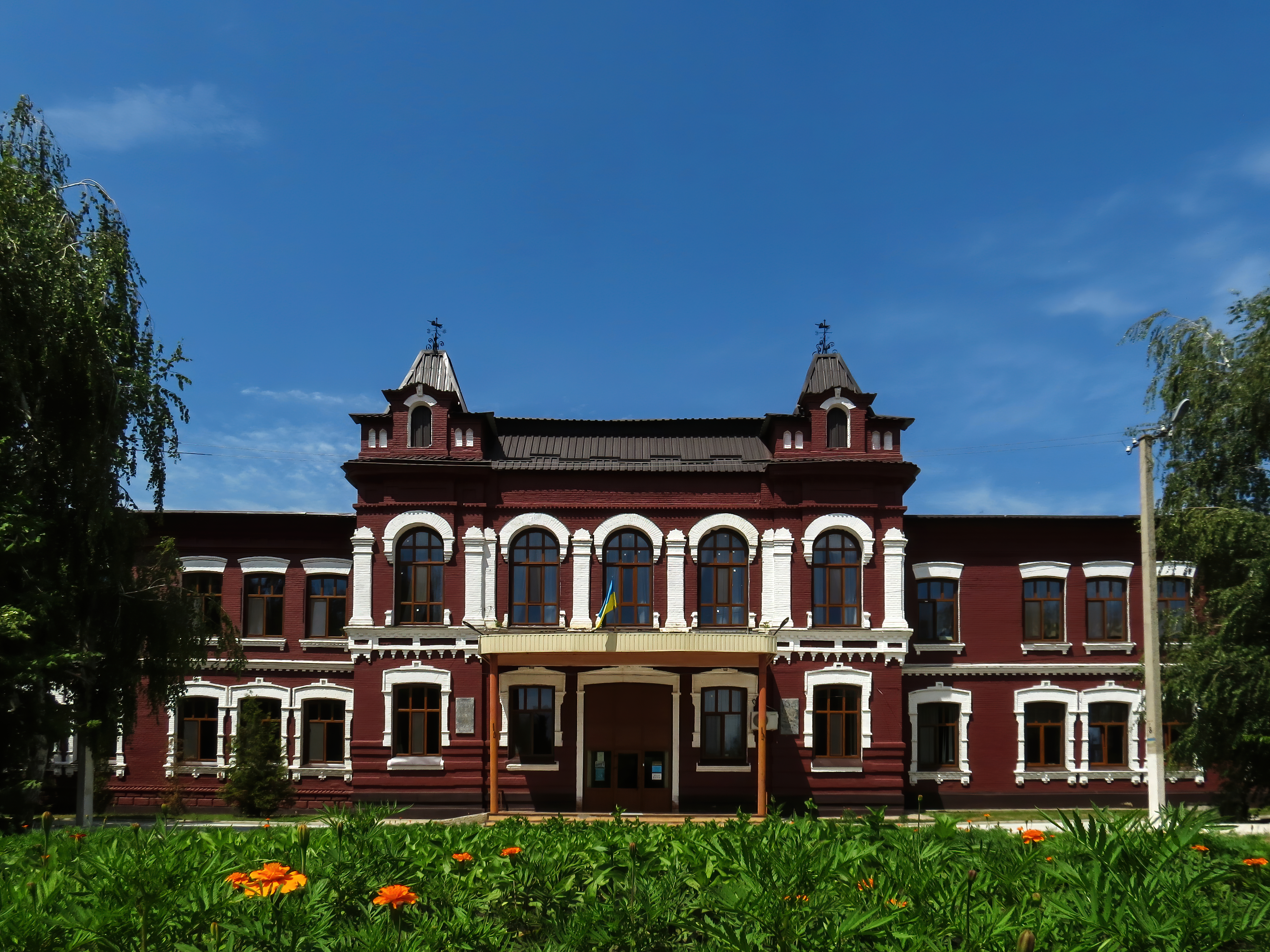
- Building of the Luhansk National University

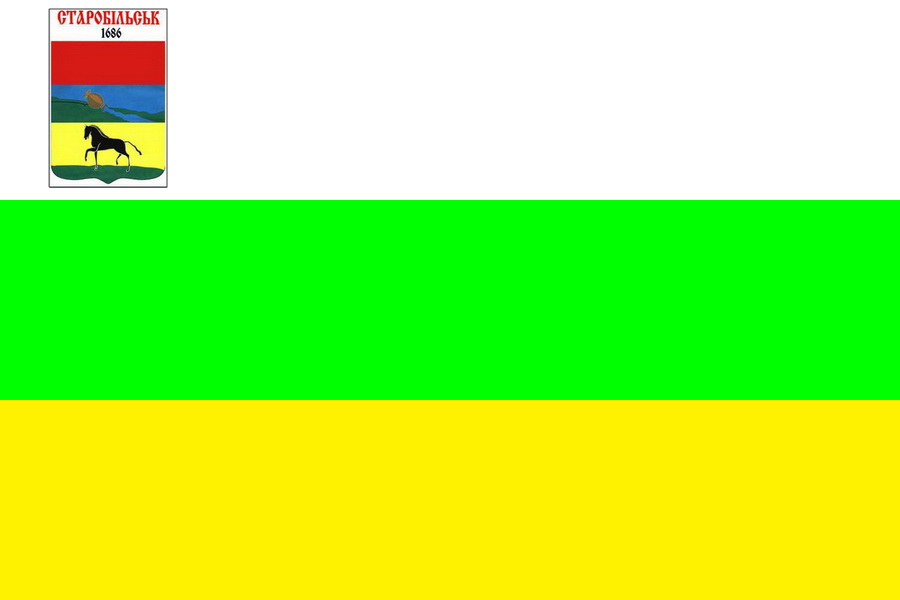
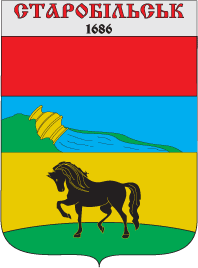
- Flag Coat of arms
- Interactive map of Starobilsk
- Location within Luhansk Oblast Location within Ukraine
- Coordinates: 49°16′39″N 38°55′27″E
- Country: Ukraine
- Oblast: Luhansk Oblast
- Raion: Starobilsk Raion
- Hromada: Starobilsk urban hromada
- First mentioned: 1686
- City Status: 1938

Population (2022)
  - Total: 15,947
- Area code: (+380)
- Vehicle registration: BB / 13
- Control: Russia

Starobilsk (Ukrainian: Старобільськ, lit. 'Old Bilsk' IPA: [stɐroˈbʲilʲsʲk]; Russian: Старобельск, romanized: Starobelsk) is a city in Luhansk Oblast, in eastern Ukraine. It serves as the administrative center of Starobilsk Raion. The modern settlement was founded in 1686, and it was granted city status in 1938. The city has a population of 15,947 (2022 estimate). After the Russian invasion of Ukraine, it has been under Russian occupation since 28 February 2022.

== History ==
=== Prehistory ===
Presumably, Starobilsk traces its heritage to the settlement of Bielska Sloboda which originally might have been named after Okolnichy Bogdan Belsky of Litvin Bielsky family who at that time was a subject of the Grand Duchy of Moscow.

Bielsky arrived at the banks of Siversky Donets to build a fortress at the southern borders Tsare-Borisov (after Muscovite Tsar Boris Godunov) which was erected not far away in 1598–1600. In 1602 Godunov became suspicious of Belsky and order him to be arrested, stripped of any estates, and exiled to Siberia. After the death of Godunov Belsky was granted amnesty in 1605 due to the fact that his sister being the wife of the deceased Boris Godunov, Maria Skuratova-Belskaya, became a regent. Belsky was sent as a voivode to Kazan where in 1611 was killed by a mob after refusing to pledge allegiance to False Dmitry II. Sloboda gradually became abandoned, while the fortress was destroyed in 1612 in one of the Tatar raids.

=== Origin ===
In 1686 the settlement was repopulated by servicemen of the Ostrohozk Sloboda Cossack Regiment who originally came from Poltava and Chernihiv regions and named their settlement after a town of Bilsk, Cossack Hetmanate that might have belonged to another Litvin who sided with Muscovites, Theodore Bielsky.

Being runaway serfs, the Tsarist government allowed them to settle in the military frontier with the Crimean realm to carry out border guard functions. After the place became populated with serfs from the central regions of today's Russia, the Tsarist government took measures to find and return those fugitives. In 1701 the Ambassadorial Prikaz decided to conduct a population census in new settlements along Aidar and Siversky Donets. Most population avoided the census. According to data of stolnik M.Pushkin who in 1703 conducted a population census in 34 settlements, in Bielsky was registered only 41 residents although in reality there were much more.

Trying to meet the demands of Russian landlords who repeatedly turned to the Tsar with complaints and requests to return fugitives, on 6 July 1707 Peter the Great issued an edict (ukase) about the search of "newly arrived from Rus all ranks of people". To the Don was sent a punitive detachment under the command of Colonel Prince Yuriy Dolgorukiy. (Note: not to be confused with the Great Prince of Kyiv) He was charged to search for fugitives and "take them to those landowners from whom they ran away". That action led to the well-known Bulavin Rebellion. Struggling with the rebellion, Tsarist troops eventually burnt the settlement to the ground. In 1732 the settlement was repopulated again by peasants from around Ostrogozhsk (Ostrohozk) turning it into a sloboda Stara-Bila. Among the first of its new residents were again servicemen of the Ostrohozk Regiment led by sotnik I. Senelnykov. In 1782 Staro-Bila was assigned to the Derkul stud of Bilovodsk district (Voronezh Governorate). On Tsarist edict (ukase) from 1 May 1797 sloboda Staro-Bila was renamed into Starobelsk and became the administrative center of Starobelsk uyezd in Kharkov Governorate of the Russian Empire.

=== Modern era ===
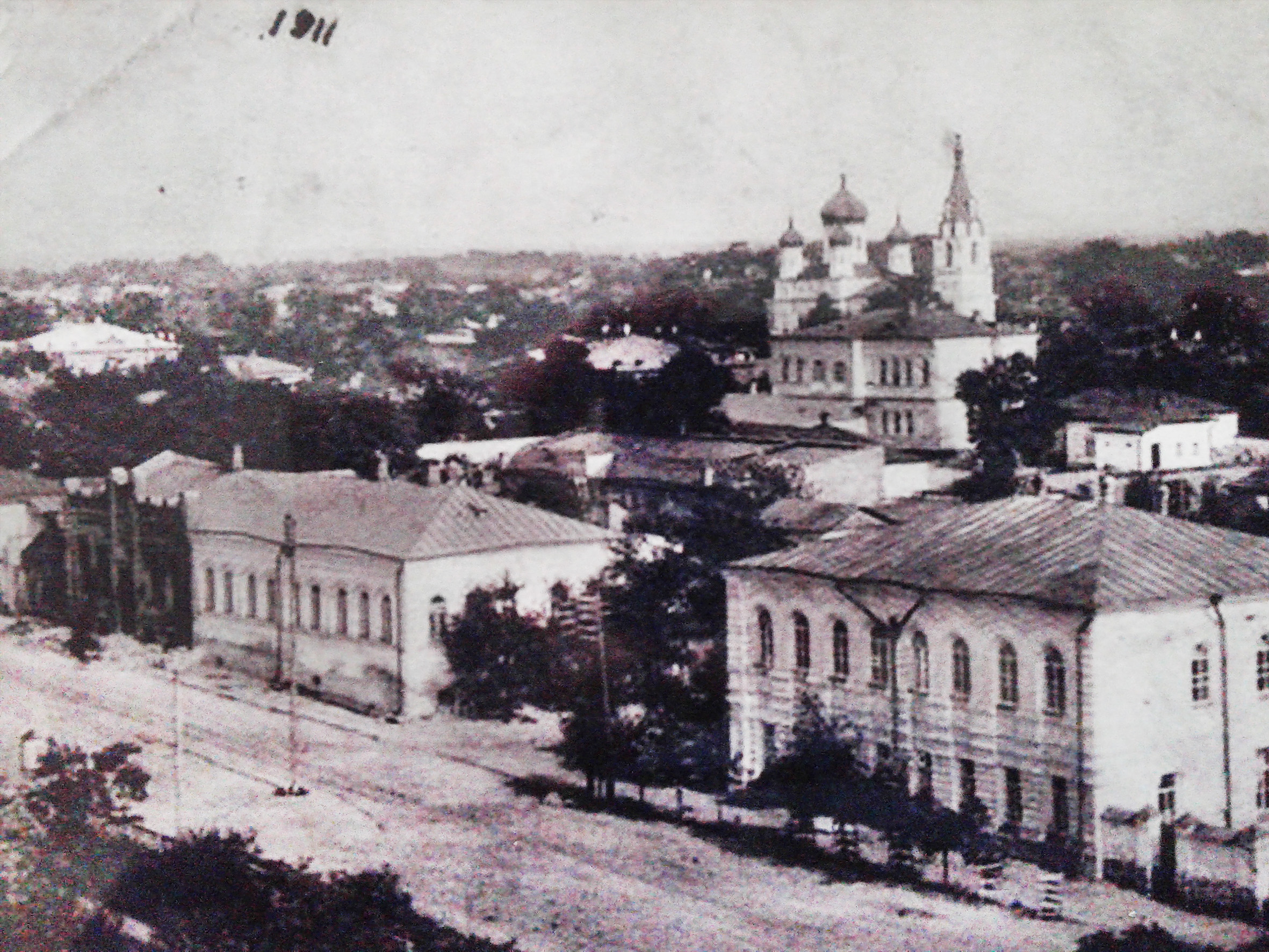
Starobilsk in 1911

Founded on 12 October 1851, Starobilsk "Joy of All Who Sorrows" Convent (Свято-Скорботний жіночий монастир) became a spiritual center for the region. After the Bolshevik revolution, the convent was restricted and, in April 1924, it was closed down. In 1992, the state returned it to the Orthodox Church. It was reconsecrated and opened in 1995.

During the Ukrainian War of Independence, the town was occupied by Austrian troops during the Central Powers' advance through Ukraine in the spring of 1918 but soon became a center of activity for the Revolutionary Insurrectionary Army of Ukraine or Anarchists. A photograph in the City Regional Museum (Старобільський краєзнавчий музей) shows Anarchist leader Nestor Makhno addressing the people of Starobilsk from a balcony on the main square in 1919. Afterwards, it was administratively part of the Donets Governorate of Ukraine.

==== Prison camp for Polish POW officers ====
Memorial plaque to Polish POWs held by the Soviets in the local POW camp and then murdered in the Katyn massacre

During World War II, the old convent was the site of a Soviet prison camp for Polish prisoners of war (POWs), especially officers. Forty-eight of those who died in the camp were buried at the Starobilsk cemetery. In 1994, their bodies were moved to the Polish War Quarter built by the Council for the Protection of Struggle and Martyrdom Sites at the Chmyrivka cemetery. A plaque on the outside wall of the convent states that more than 4,000 Polish prisoners of war were confined inside the convent and ultimately executed in 1940. The Starobilsk prisoners were executed at the District Directorate of the NKVD in Kharkiv and later buried in the forest in Pyatykhatky. These executions, together with executions of Polish officers held in POW camps at Kozelsk, Ostashkov, and some smaller camps, became known as the Katyn massacre.

The German Wehrmacht entered Starobilsk in late 1942, and evacuated nine months later, destroying much of the city but neglecting to dynamite the milk factory. The Germans operated a Nazi prison in the city. The town was rebuilt around this factory, which in turn helped the region recover after the war.

=== 21st century ===
During the first phase of the Russo-Ukrainian War many places in Luhansk Oblast were taken over by pro-Russian separatists; however, Starobilsk remained under Ukrainian control. The flag of the Luhansk People's Republic was raised over the Hotel Aidar on 17 June 2014, but swiftly removed. The city was occupied by a military presence for two years thereafter, during which time the statue of Lenin in Starobilsk city park was toppled by a tank.

In 2016, Lenin Street was renamed Monastery Street as it had been before the Bolshevik revolution.

==== Russian occupation ====
On 24 February 2022, at the start of the 2022 Russian invasion of Ukraine, Russian Forces began an assault on Starobilsk, consisting of an unspecified number of Tanks, BMPS, and infantry.

On 6 March 2022, hundreds of locals gathered and took down the flag of the Luhansk People's Republic, burning it and singing the Ukrainian national anthem. The pro-Russian forces dispersed the pro-Ukrainian meeting with shots in the air.

On 11 August 2022, Askyar Laishev, a former law enforcement officer and collaborator, was killed in a car bombing on Shevchenko Street.

In early September 2022, Ukraine launched a major counteroffensive in the region. On 13 September, Ukrainian Governor of Luhansk Oblast, Serhiy Haidai, stated that Russian forces had fled Starobilsk adding that the city was "practically empty". As for December 2022, the latter claim was proven to be false, as the Ukrainian counteroffensive has stalled outside Svatove, around 60 km from Starobilsk.

On 1 April 2024 a car bomb in the centre of Starobilsk killed the pro-Russian Deputy Head of the Centre for Servicing Educational Organisations of the Luhansk People’s Republic, Valerii Chaika.

On 22 May 2026, a drone strike hit a student dormitory and educational buildings of Starobilsk College of Luhansk Pedagogical University. Russian and Russian-installed officials attributed the attack to Ukraine. 21 people were killed while 42 others were injured.

== Demographics ==
Ethnic makeup as of 2001:

Ethnic groups in Starobilsk
Ethnic groups	percent
Ukrainians	82.29%
Russians	16.30%
Belarusians	0.34%
Armenians	0.28%
Georgians	0.10%

Native language according to the 2001 Ukrainian census:

Native languages in Starobilsk
Languages	percent
Ukrainian	60.8%
Russian	38.7%
Armenian	0.2%
Belarusian	0.1%
others	0.2%

=== Historical population data ===
As of the first general census of the Russian Empire in 1897, Starobilsk counted a population of 9,801 inhabitants. The native language composition was as follows:

1897 census
Languages	percent
Ukrainian	78.47%
Russian	20.28%
others	1.25%

== International relations ==
=== Twin cities ===
Starobilsk is twinned with:

- Lublin, Poland

== Notable people ==
- Tamara Iosifovna Balezina, biologist
- Georgy Langemak, engineer for the Soviet space program
- Nadiya Svitlychna, Ukrainian dissent and human rights activist, attended school in Starobilsk
- Ivan Svitlychnyi, Ukrainian poet and Soviet dissident
- Oleh Liashko, Ukrainian politician and founder of the nationalist Radical Party
- Serhiy Zhadan, Ukrainian poet

== Gallery ==
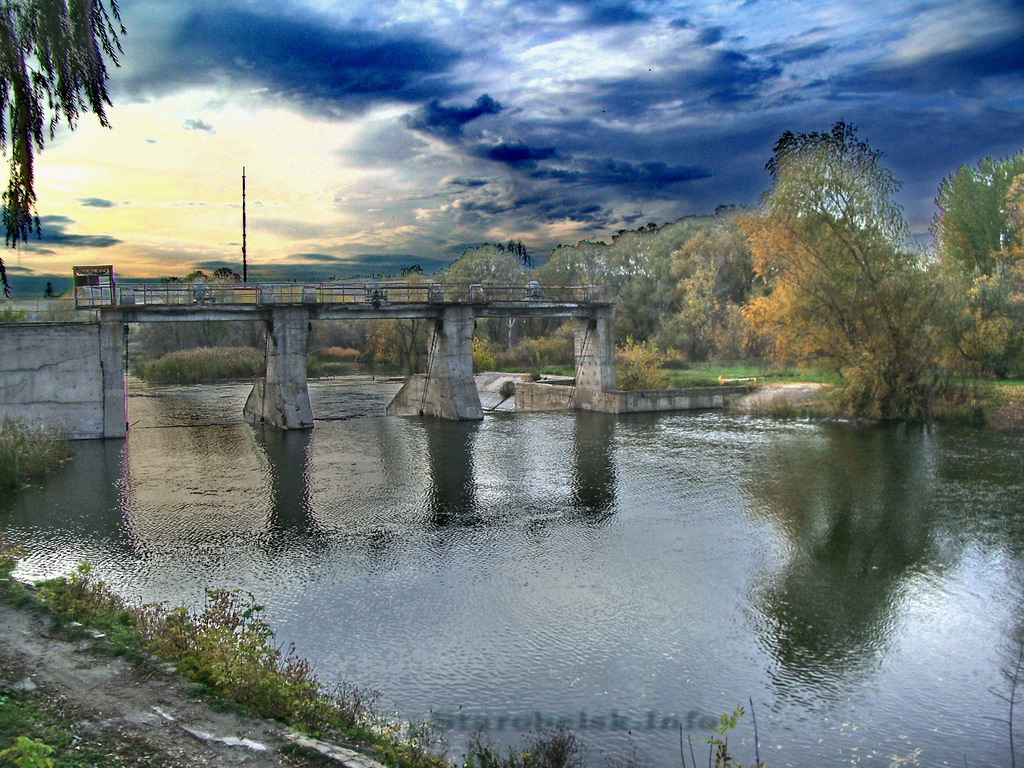
Starobilsk dam on Aidar River

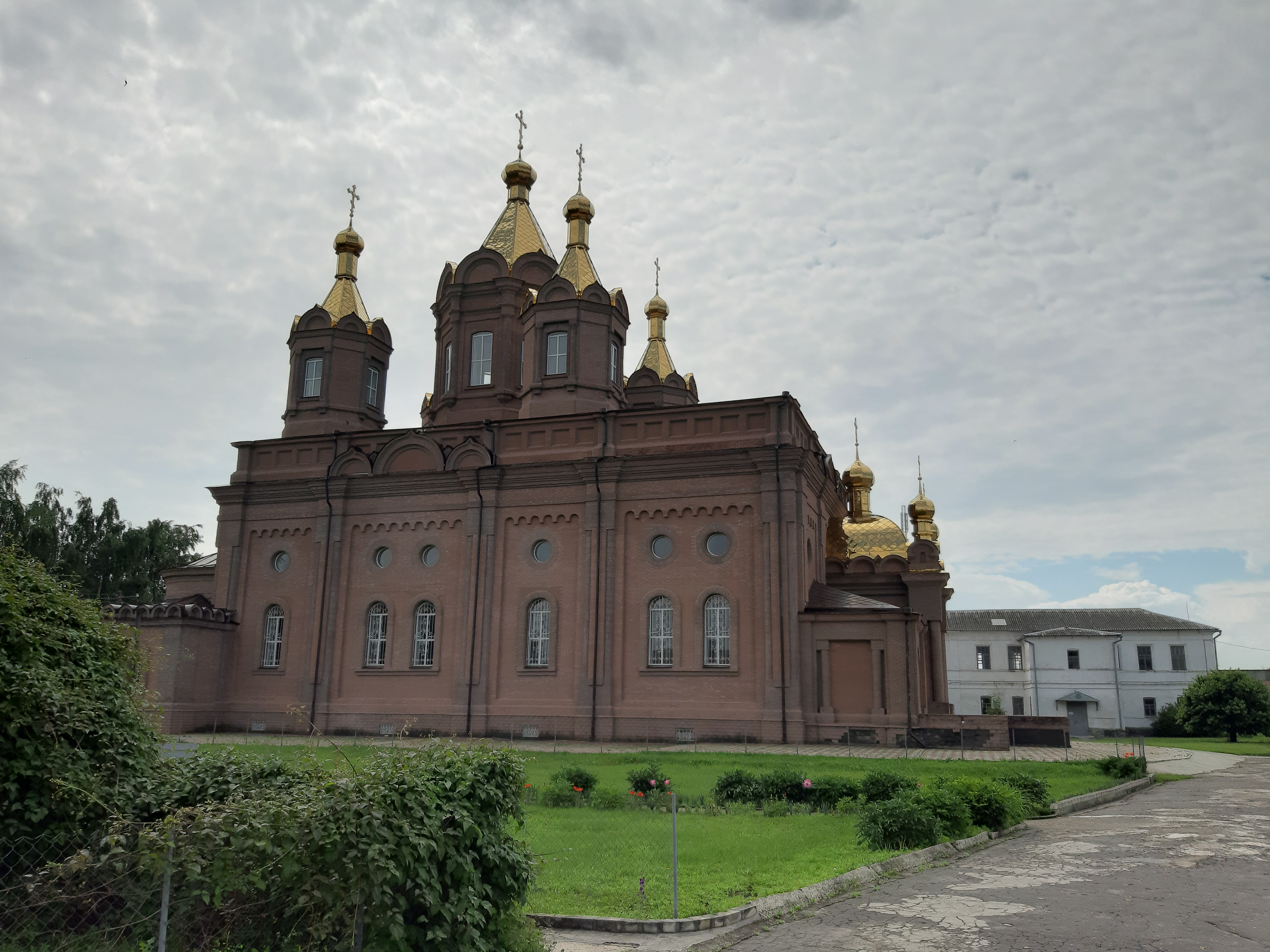
Starobilsk Monastery

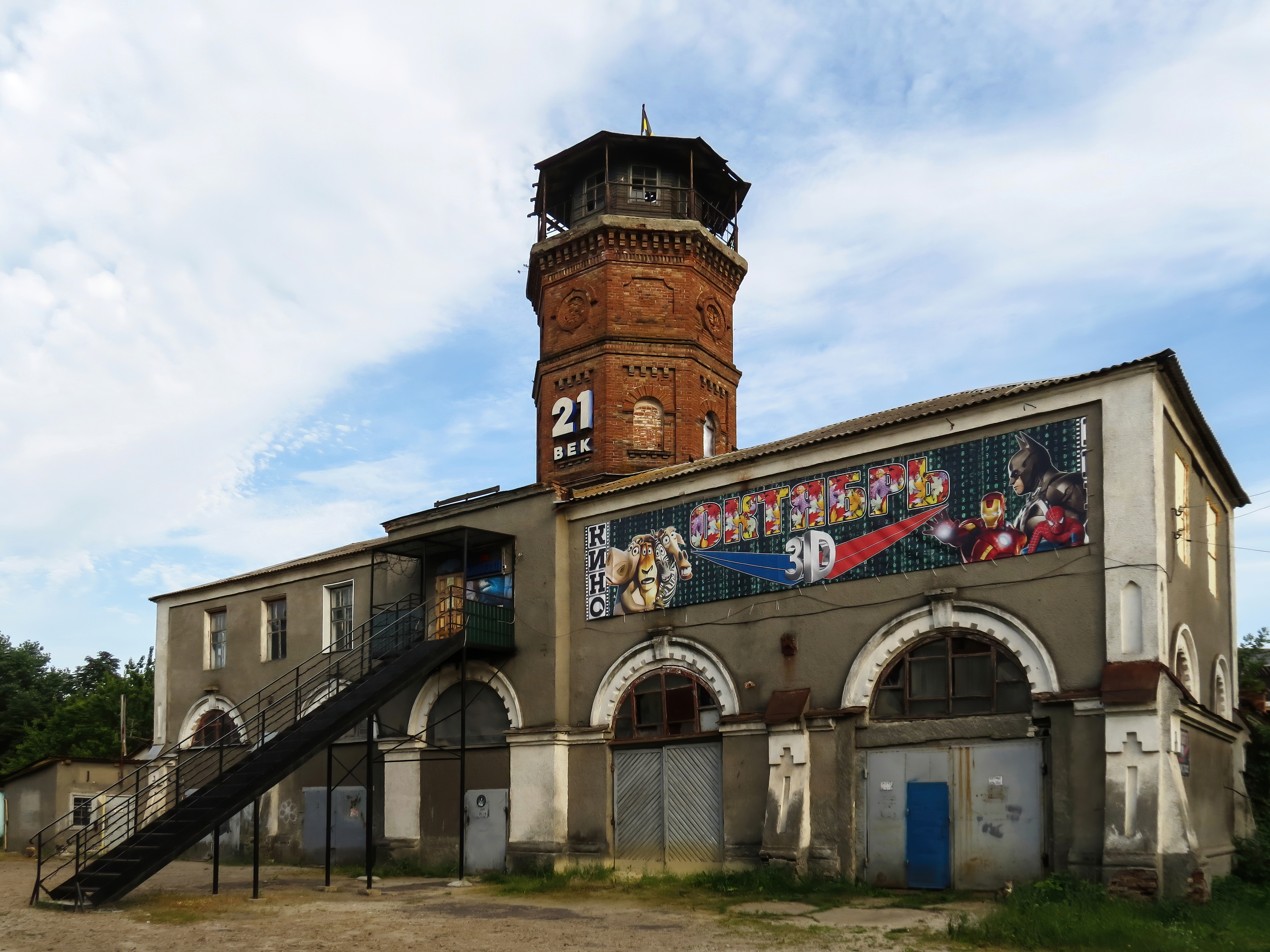
Old fire station

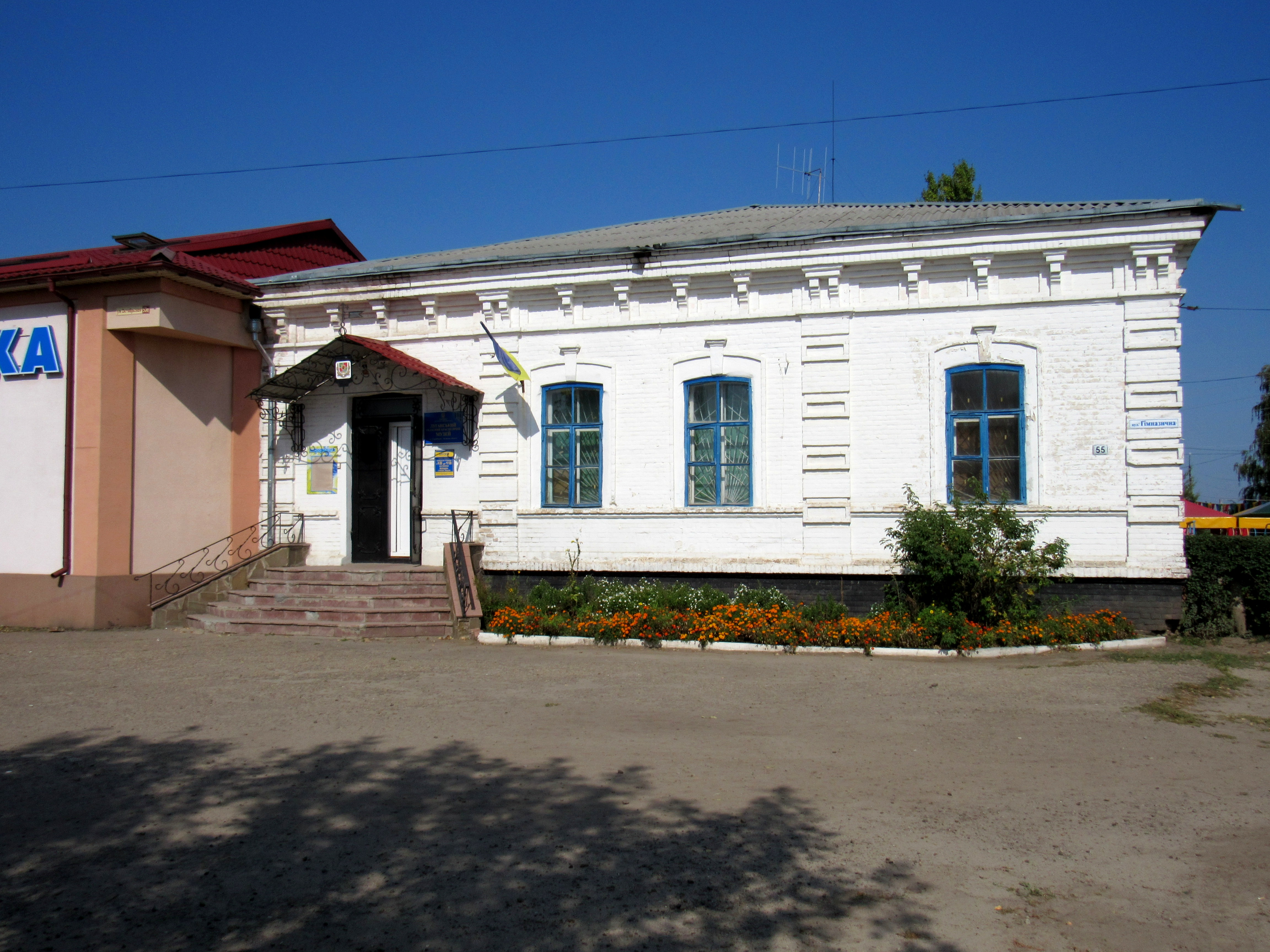
Local museum

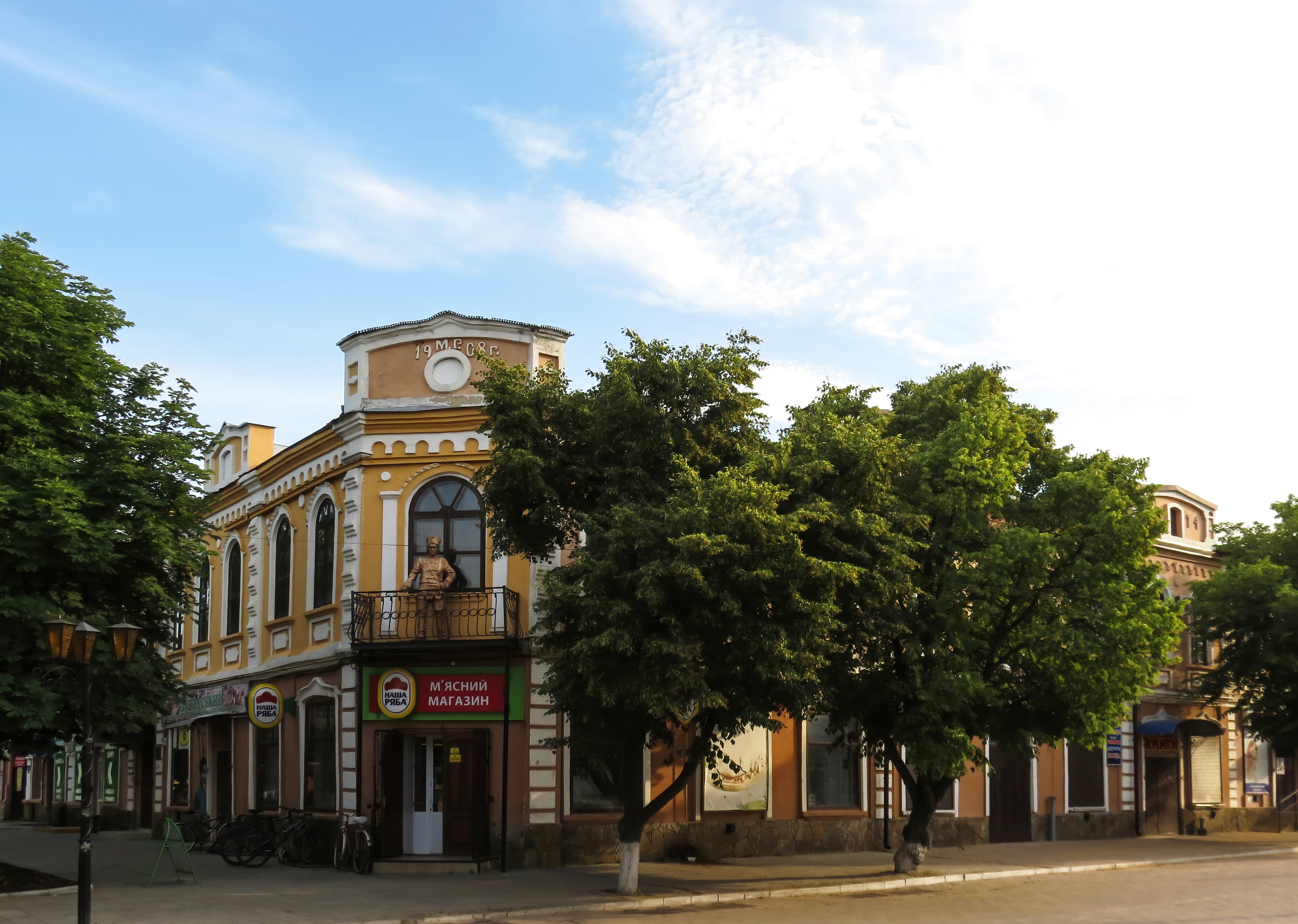
Historic architecture in the city center

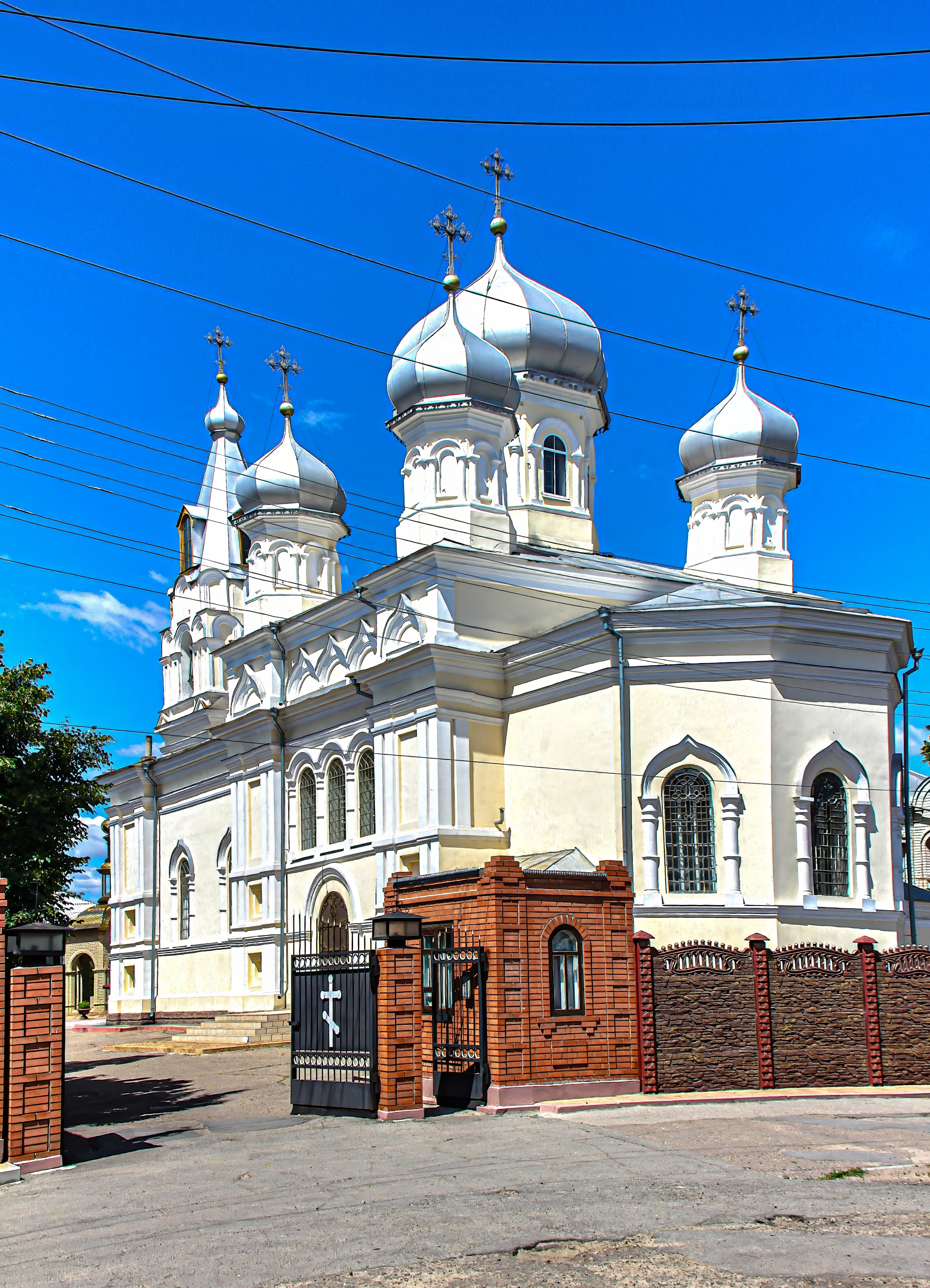
Saint Nicholas cathedral
