= Bilovodsk =

Urban locality in Luhansk Oblast, Ukraine

Bilovodsk Біловодськ
- Rural settlement
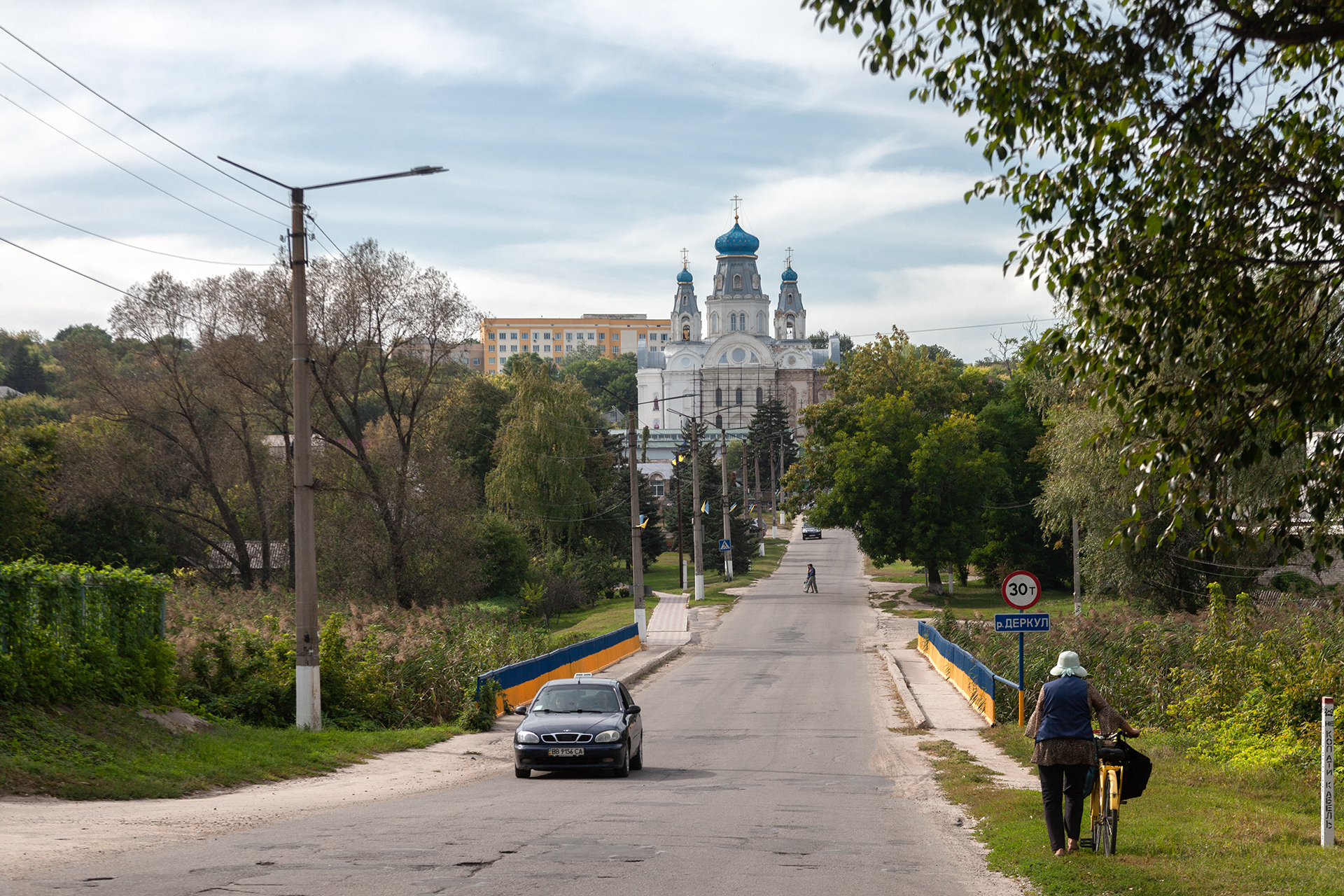

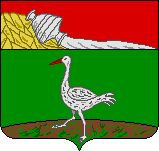
- Coat of arms

- Location in Luhansk Oblast Location in Ukraine
- Coordinates: 49°12′0″N 39°34′32″E
- Country: Ukraine
- Oblast: Luhansk Oblast
- Raion: Starobilsk Raion
- Hromada: Bilovodsk settlement hromada
- Founded: 1686

Government
  - Mayor: Oleh Miroshnyk

Population (2022)
  - Total: 7,695
- Time zone: UTC+2 (EET)
  - Summer (DST): UTC+3 (EEST)

Bilovodsk (Ukrainian: Біловодськ) is a rural settlement in the Starobilsk Raion of Luhansk Oblast in eastern Ukraine on the banks of the Derkul river. It has an estimated population of 7,695 (2022 estimate)

== Geography ==
Bilovodsk is located on the Derkul river, a left tributary of the Donets. Chalk deposits in the springs that flow into the river give it a white color, which is where the name of the town, Bilovodsk, lit. 'White Water' comes from. Bilovodsk is located in the northeast part of Luhansk Oblast, 92 kilometres (57 mi) from the oblast center Luhansk.

== History ==
=== Early history ===
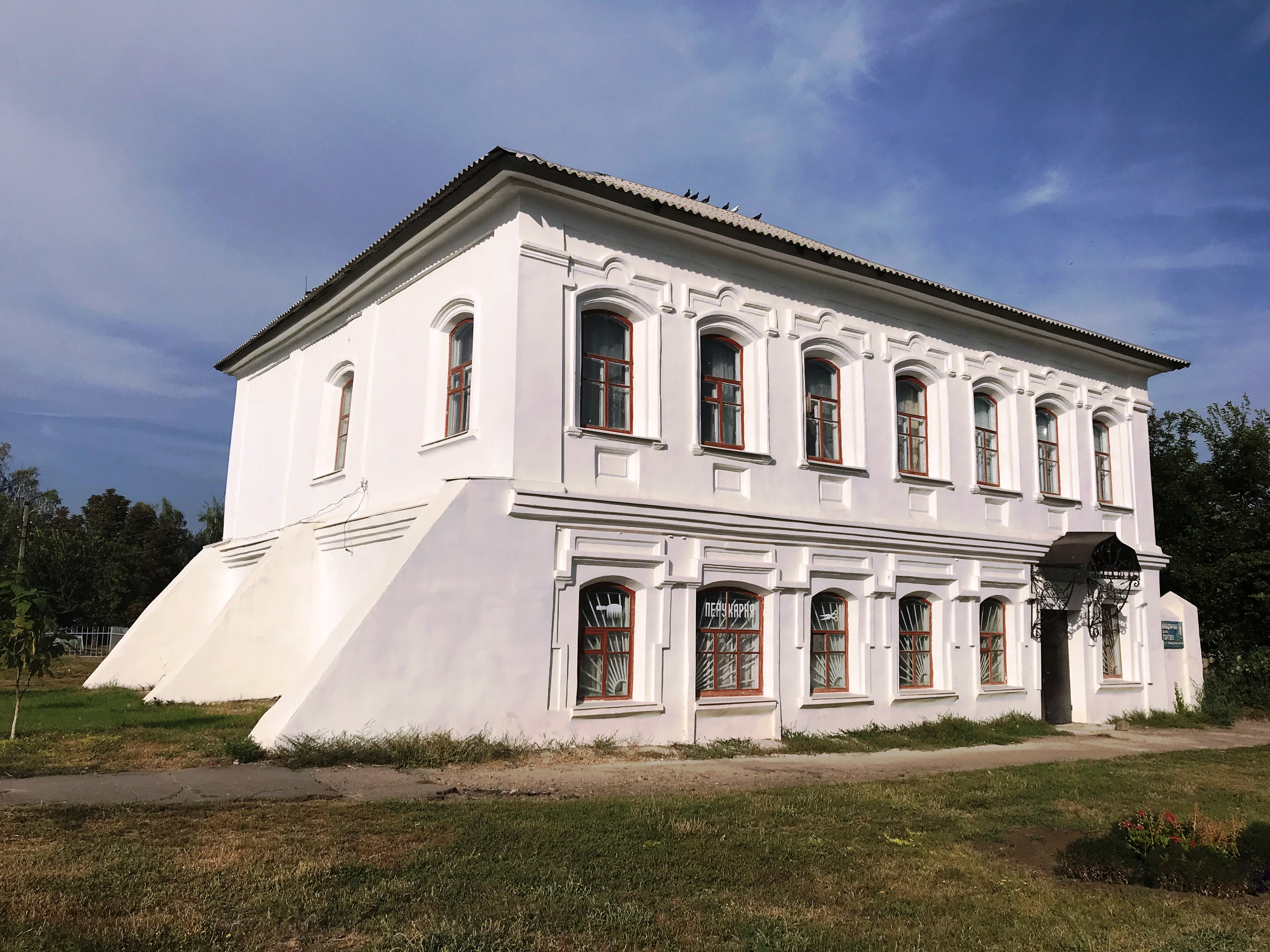
Old manor house

Remnants of a Neolithic settlement have been uncovered near the settlement.

Bilovodsk was originally founded in 1686. Its first inhabitants were Cossacks who settled on the free land, as well as fugitive serfs fleeing their enslavers. However, due to the fact that the settlement was founded without the Tsar's permission and the residents took part in the Bulavin Rebellion, the government of the Tsardom of Russia sent a punitive expedition that burned down the village by royal decree in 1708. The area was resettled in 1717.

In 1779, it was assigned to Voronezh Governorate in the Russian Empire. In 1797, it was reassigned to the Sloboda Ukraine Governorate.

According to the Russian Empire census of 1897, out of the 12,630 inhabitants of Bilovodsk, only about 1,300 were literate. Under the Tsarist rule local inhabitants engaged in plough production.

=== 20th century ===
During World War I and the Ukrainian War of Independence, Bilovodsk was captured by German troops in April 1918, and passed to the Ukrainian State. Then in November 1918, it passed to Don Cossacks, and at the turn of 1918 and 1919, it was captured by the Bolsheviks. In June 1919, it was captured by White Russian forces. In December 1919, it was recaptured by the Bolsheviks.

Afterwards it was administratively part of the Donets Governorate of Ukraine. In 1923, Bilovodsk Raion was established, with Bilovodsk as its administrative center.

As a result of the Holodomor, a manmade famine in Soviet Ukraine between 1932 and 1933, there were a documented 185 deaths in Bilovodsk and surrounding villages.

During World War II, Bilovodsk was occupied by Nazi Germany between July 13, 1942 and January 20, 1943. During the occupation, they heavily destroyed the economy and infrastructure of the entire Bilovodsk Raion, and kidnapped 136 young people from Bilovodsk alone for forced labor in Germany.

The village received urban-type settlement status in 1957.

=== 21st century ===
On 29 October 2017, Bilovodsk settlement hromada was established as the only hromada in Bilovodsk Raion. In 2018, Bilovodsk had a population of 7,764.

Bilovodsk Raion was abolished in 18 July 2020 as part of nationwide administrative reforms in Ukraine. The area of Bilovodsk Raion, including Bilovodsk itself was merged into Starobilsk Raion.

Bilovodsk was taken over and occupied by Russia during the Russian invasion of Ukraine that began in 2022. The Institute for the Study of War has described Bilovodsk, alongside Svatove and Starobilsk, as one of the few strategically important areas in northeastern Ukraine. Starobilsk sits on a major road junction, which determines which bases Russia can use in Russian territory to support attacks in Ukraine.

In August 2022, Ukrainian Luhansk Oblast military administration head Serhiy Haidai claimed that Russia was forcibly mobilizing Ukrainians in the town, saying "men gradually started disappearing in Starobilsk, Bilovodsk, and even in the recently captured Severodonetsk and Lysychansk". On August 13, guerillas injured the Russian-installed mayor and his deputy in a roadside ambush. In September 2022, during the rigged 2022 annexation referendums in Russian-occupied Ukraine, there were reports of coercion in Bilovodsk, among other places. A company director in Bilovodsk announced to employees that voting would be compulsory and anyone refusing to take part in the votes would be fired and their names given to Russian authorities.

On December 21, 2022, Haidai stated that Russia had transferred over fifteen officials from Novosibirsk in Russia to serve as occupation officials in Bilovodsk. The Ukrainian General Staff claimed on December 29 that the Russian military had seized a civilian hospital in Bilovodsk to treat more than 100 wounded Russian and Wagner Group servicemen.

On January 1, 2023, the Ukrainian military claimed that 350 Russian servicemen were being treated in the Bilovodsk city hospital, a significant increase from the December 29 numbers. On January 5, Haidai said that Russian soldiers were coercing farmers in Bilovodsk to abandon their hangars in order to accommodate Russian servicemen and personnel. In October 2023, the General Staff of the Armed Forces of Ukraine announced that Russia was forcibly resettling people from Bilovodsk to Luhansk.

== Demographics ==
Population census

Year	Pop.	±% p.a.
1838	5,542	—
1892	12,000	+1.44%
1897	12,630	+1.03%
1904	17,000	+4.34%
1939	7,037	−2.49%
1959	9,577	+1.55%

Year	Pop.	±% p.a.
1970	8,564	−1.01%
1979	10,494	+2.28%
1989	11,151	+0.61%
2001	8,764	−1.99%
2018	7,764	−0.71%
2022	7,695	−0.22%

As of the 2001 Ukrainian census, Bilovodsk had a population of 8,764. The census also recorded the ethnic statistics of its population; 85.9% were Ukrainians, 12.5% were Russians, 0.3% were Belarusians, and 1.3% were of other ethnicities. In terms of native language, 85.7% spoke Ukrainian, 14.1% Russian and 0.1% spoke another language or didn't state any native language.

Ethnic groups in Bilovodsk
Ethnic groups	percent
Ukrainians	85.9%
Russians	12.5%
Belarusians	0.3%
others	1.3%

Native languages in Bilovodsk
Languages	percent
Ukrainian	85.7%
Russian	14.1%
others	0.1%

== Climate ==
Climate data for Bilovodsk (1981–2010)
Month	Jan	Feb	Mar	Apr	May	Jun	Jul	Aug	Sep	Oct	Nov	Dec	Year
Mean daily maximum °C (°F)	−1.7 (28.9)	−1.2 (29.8)	5.1 (41.2)	15.5 (59.9)	22.3 (72.1)	26.4 (79.5)	28.5 (83.3)	28.0 (82.4)	21.5 (70.7)	13.5 (56.3)	4.7 (40.5)	−0.6 (30.9)	13.5 (56.3)
Daily mean °C (°F)	−4.9 (23.2)	−5.0 (23.0)	0.4 (32.7)	9.0 (48.2)	15.1 (59.2)	19.3 (66.7)	21.3 (70.3)	20.2 (68.4)	14.3 (57.7)	7.8 (46.0)	1.1 (34.0)	−3.6 (25.5)	7.9 (46.2)
Mean daily minimum °C (°F)	−8.2 (17.2)	−8.8 (16.2)	−3.9 (25.0)	2.5 (36.5)	7.3 (45.1)	12.0 (53.6)	14.0 (57.2)	12.3 (54.1)	7.3 (45.1)	2.5 (36.5)	−2.4 (27.7)	−6.8 (19.8)	2.3 (36.1)
Average precipitation mm (inches)	43.2 (1.70)	38.0 (1.50)	32.5 (1.28)	34.2 (1.35)	46.5 (1.83)	51.8 (2.04)	58.4 (2.30)	33.6 (1.32)	45.2 (1.78)	38.6 (1.52)	45.1 (1.78)	46.9 (1.85)	514.0 (20.24)
Average precipitation days (≥ 1.0 mm)	9.0	8.2	7.8	6.3	6.5	7.7	7.2	4.1	6.0	6.3	7.5	9.1	85.7
Average relative humidity (%)	85.3	83.2	78.8	67.0	64.0	67.1	67.0	64.4	70.2	78.0	85.5	86.6	74.8
Source: World Meteorological Organization
