= Nadiya Svitlychna =

Ukrainian dissident and human rights activist

- Надія Світлична
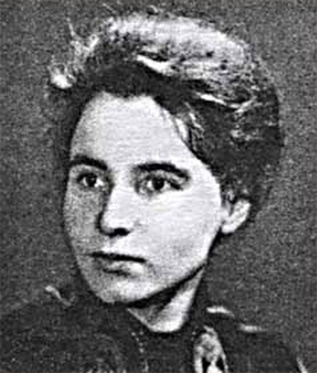
- Born: November 8, 1936; Polovynkyne, Starobilsk Raion, Luhansk Oblast, Soviet Union
- Died: August 8, 2006 (aged 69); Irvington, New Jersey, United States
- Education: University of Kharkiv
- Known for: human rights activism with participation in the Ukrainian Helsinki group
- Movement: dissident movement in the Soviet Union
- Children: Yarema
- Relatives: Ivan Svitlychnyi (brother)
- Awards: Shevchenko National Prize, Vasyl Stus Prize

Nadiya Oleksiyivna Svitlychna (Ukrainian: Надія Олексіївна Світлична, born 8 November 1936, the village of Polovynkyne, Starobilsk district, Luhansk region — 8 August 2006, Irvington, New Jersey, United States) was a Ukrainian dissident and human rights activist, and an active member of the Ukrainian Helsinki group. She was a writer and editor and for a time was a political prisoner of the Soviet regime.

== Biography ==
Nadiya Svitlychna was born in 1936 in Polovynkyne, Starobilsk Raion, Luhansk Oblast. Her brother Ivan Svitlychnyi was a prominent linguist, literary critic and dissident. Nadiya graduated with a degree in philology. Along with her brother Ivan, she joined the Artistic Youths' Club in Kyiv, getting acquainted with Alla Horska and taking part in the club's choir. In 1965 she travelled to Donetsk in order to work along with Horska and other artists on the creation of mosaics. Together with Yevhen Sverstiuk, Svitlychna was the first person to discover Horska's body after her murder in 1970.

Svitlychna engaged in the spread of samvydav publications. In 1972 she was arrested by Soviet authorities for "anti-Soviet propaganda" and sentenced to 4 years of imprisonment in labour camps. Her son Yarema was separated and sent to an orphanage without her knowledge. In the end, the child could be found and sent to live with Nadia's mother, being cared for by Leonida Svitlychna, the wife of Nadiya's brother. However, the authorities continued to threaten the family with depriving them of custody over the child.

Following her liberation in May 1976, Nadiya returned to Kyiv, but government persecution against her continued. She was prevented from receving local registration and had to earn her living as a street cleaner, but was eventually fired. Despite marrying for a second time with a local man, Nadiya continued to be refused registration, and decided to emigrate. After moving to the United States in November 1978, she became a member of the External Representation of the Ukrainian Helsinki Group, which also included General Petro Grigorenko and Leonid Plyushch, and continued her work in advocating human and national rights in Ukraine and protesting Soviet violations of the Helsinki Accords. Svitlychna also worked as a journalist for Radio Svoboda. In 1980–1985 she published the Herald of Repressions in Ukraine. Svitlychna was a member of the Plast scouting society.

After the dissolution of the Soviet Union, Svitlychna made several visits to Kyiv and was awarded the Shevchenko National Prize along with her late brother Ivan. In 1994 she co-founded an initiative group with the aim of establishing a museum dedicated to the Sixtiers, which would be financed from the prize sum. In 1999 Svitlychna promoted Mykola Plakhotniuk as head of the civic organization tasked with establishing the museum. The initative was registered one year later and established an office in the Podil district. Svitlychna helped provide the museum with important materials from her personal archive, which was fully transferred to the institution by her husband following Svitlychna's death in 2006. Following almost a decade of restoration works, the Museum of the Sixtiers opened its doors for the public in 2012.

== Legacy ==
Svitlychna was praised by Ukraine's President Viktor Yushchenko, who stated that "her views, the way she lived her life and passed along values to the next generation, have left footsteps to follow for millions of contemporary Ukrainian patriots."
