= Horodyshche, Bilovodsk settlement hromada, Starobilsk Raion, Luhansk Oblast =

Coordinates: 49°03′16″N 39°38′38″E

Horodyshche (Ukrainian: Городи́ще; Russian: Городище, romanized: Gorodishche) is a village in northeastern Ukraine, in Bilovodsk settlement hromada, Starobilsk Raion, Luhansk Oblast. It has a population of 1777 people.

== History ==
As a result of the Holodomor, a manmade famine in Soviet Ukraine from 1932 to 1933, there were a documented 132 deaths in the village.

On 24 February 2022, the first day of the Russian invasion of Ukraine, the village was taken over and occupied by Russia. On 4 August 2022, Ukrainian partisans shot at a car carrying Vitaly Kovalenko - the Russian-installed head of the re-established Bilovodsk Raion - and his deputy Valentyna Hladkova, wounding both. The two had been on their way from Horodyshche, where Kovalenko lives.
