= Bilovodsk Raion =

Former subdivision of Luhansk Oblast, Ukraine

Bilovodsk Raion Біловодський район
- Raion
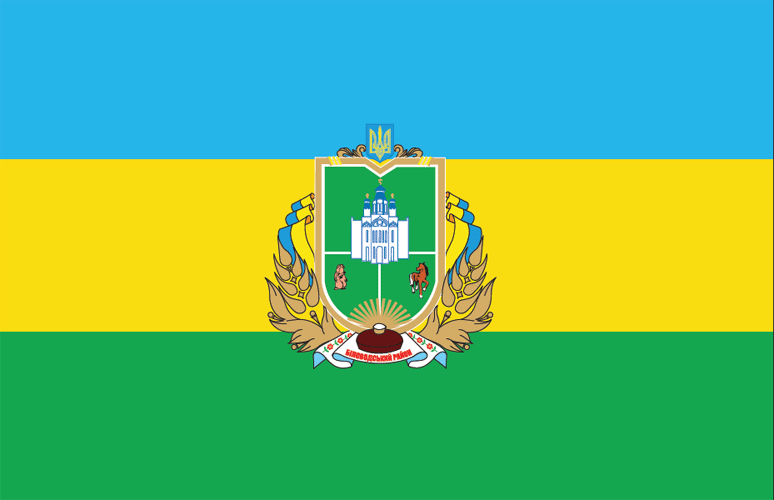
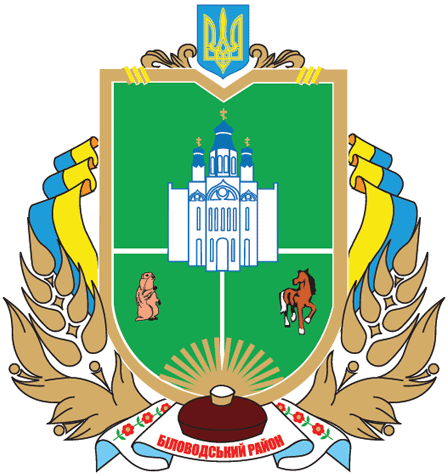
- Flag Coat of arms

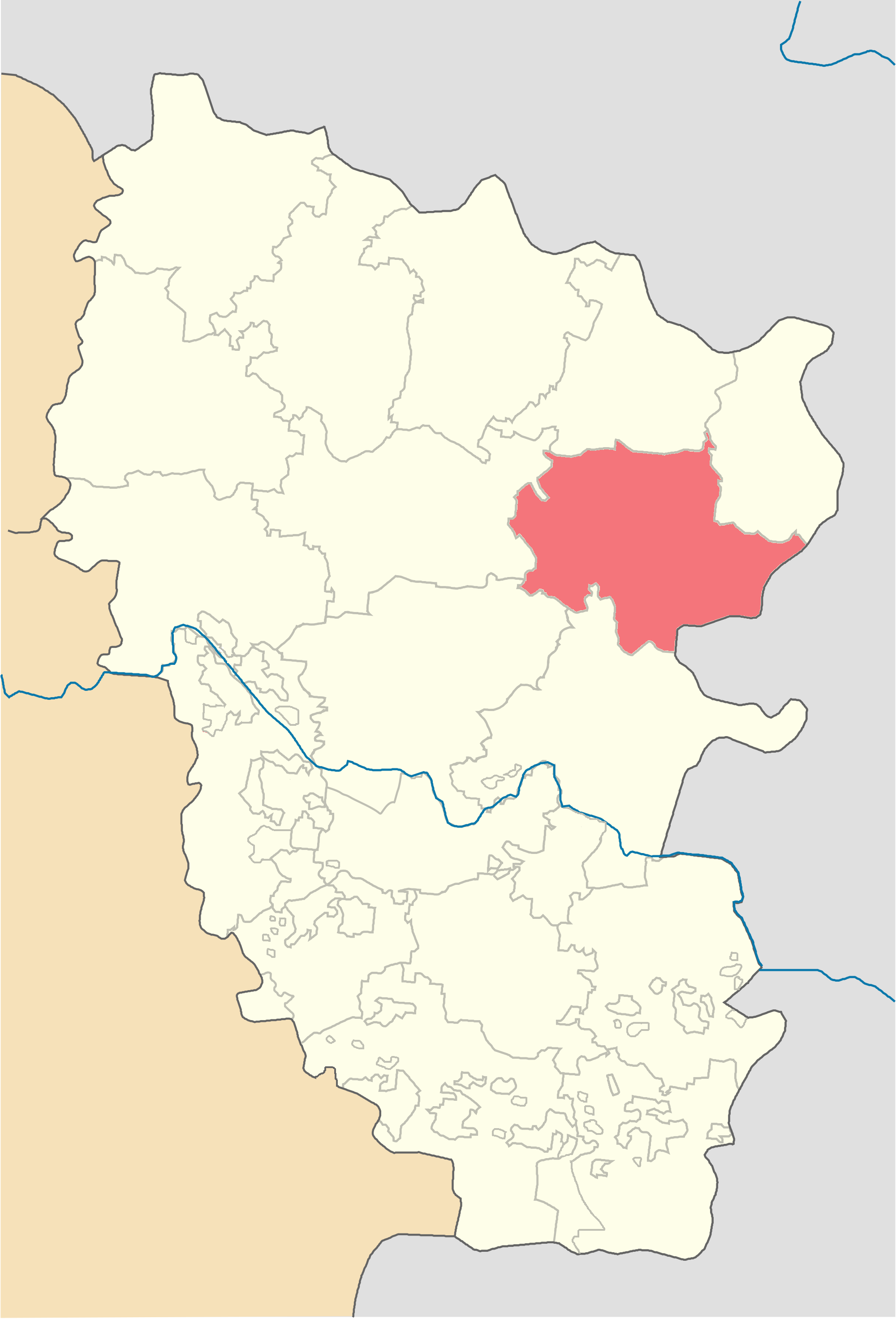
- Coordinates: 49°11′33″N 39°35′32″E
- Country: Ukraine
- Oblast: Luhansk Oblast
- Established: 1923
- Disestablished: 18 July 2020
- Admin. center: Bilovodsk
- Subdivisions: List: 0 — city councils; 1 — settlement councils; 13 — rural councils; Number of localities: 0 — cities; 1 — urban-type settlements; 32 — villages; 0 — rural settlements

Area
  - Total: 1,596.96 km^{2} (616.59 sq mi)

Population (2020)
  - Total: 22,856 ▼
  - Density: 14.312/km^{2} (37.068/sq mi)
- Time zone: UTC+02:00 (EET)
  - Summer (DST): UTC+03:00 (EEST)
- Postal index: 92800—92835
- Area code: +380 6466
- Website: http://bv.loga.gov.ua

Belovodsky Municipal District Беловодский муниципальный округ (Russian)
- District

Other transcription(s)
  - Ukrainian: Біловодський район
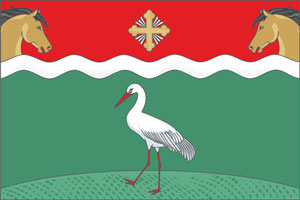
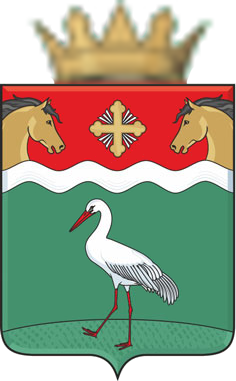
- Flag Coat of arms

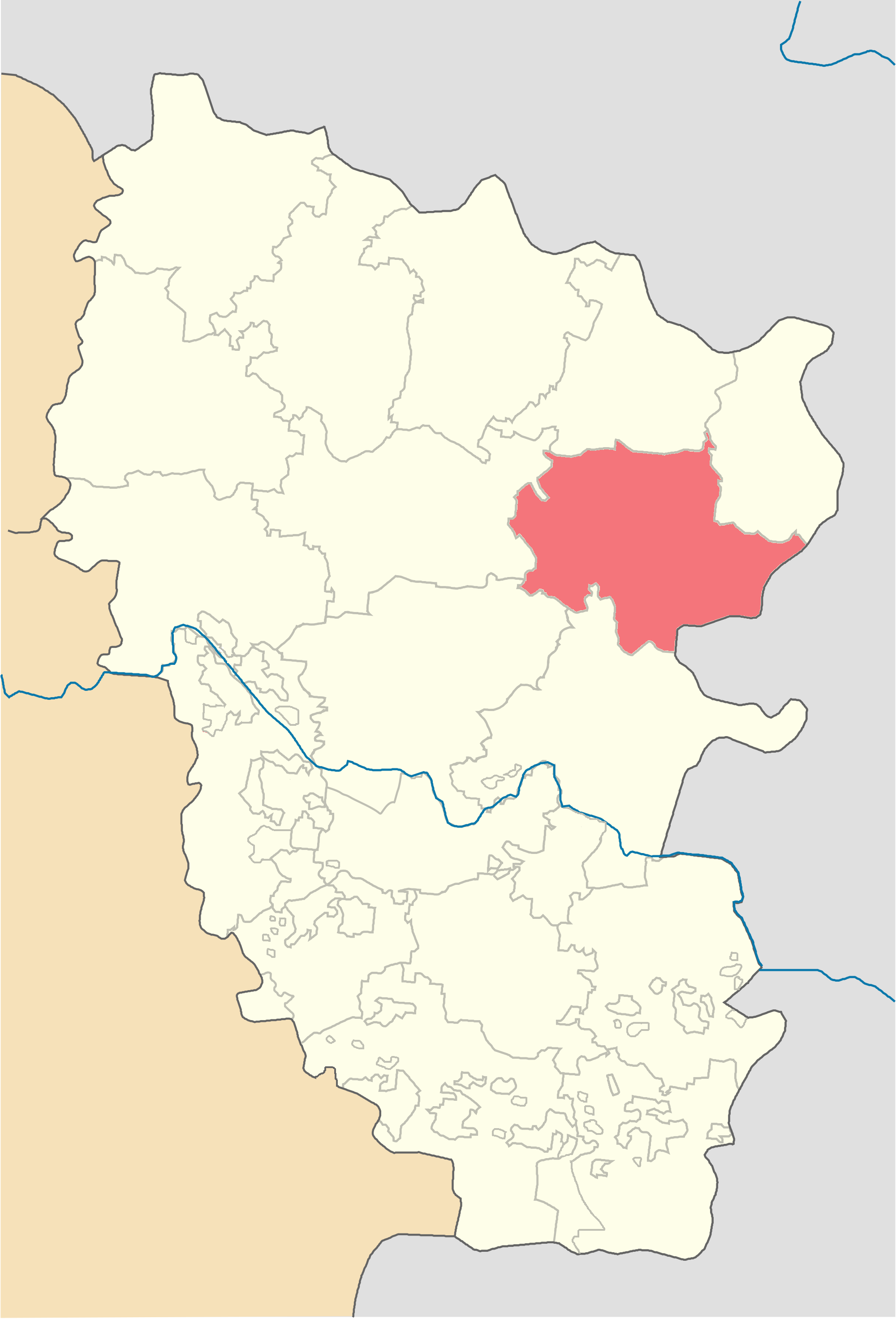
- Location of Belovodsky District in the Luhansk People's Republic
- Coordinates: 49°11′33″N 39°35′32″E
- Country: Russia
- Federal subject: Luhansk People's Republic
- Established: 1923
- Administrative center: Belovodsk

Area
  - Total: 1,596.96 km^{2} (616.59 sq mi)
- Website: https://belovodsk.su

Bilovodsk Raion (Ukrainian: Біловодський район) was a raion (district) in Luhansk Oblast in eastern Ukraine. The administrative center of the raion was the urban-type settlement of Bilovodsk. The raion was abolished on 18 July 2020 as part of the administrative reform of Ukraine, which reduced the number of raions of Luhansk Oblast to eight. The last estimate of the raion population was 22,856 (2020 est.).

== Geography ==
The raion had an area of 1,596.96 square kilometres (616.59 mi^{2}). It bordered Markivka Raion, Milove Raion, Stanytsia-Luhanska Raion, and Starobilsk Raion of Luhansk Oblast, as well as Chertkovsky District of Rostov Oblast of Russia.

== History ==
=== Original raion ===
Bilovodsk Raion was originally formed in 1923 as part of Starobilsk Okruha of Donets Governorate of the Ukrainian SSR. Donets Governorate was abolished in 1925. In July 1932, the original Donetsk Oblast was created. Until 1938, Donetsk Oblast contained both the territory of modern Donetsk Oblast as well as Luhansk Oblast, which was only split off in 1938 under the name Voroshylovhrad Oblast. Bilovodsk Raion thus became a raion of Luhansk Oblast in 1938.

During World War II, Bilovodsk Raion was occupied by Nazi Germany. During the occupation, they heavily destroyed the economy and infrastructure of the raion, and kidnapped 136 young people from Bilovodsk alone for forced labor in Germany.

On February 5, 1965, in accordance with a decree of the Presidium of the Verkhovna Rada of the Ukrainian SSR that tweaked administration across the republic, Brusivka rural council was transferred from Starobilsk Raion to Bilovodsk Raion, slightly enlarging the latter's territory. The raion's final boundaries were established in December 1966.

On 25 May 2014, the 2014 Ukrainian presidential election was held across Ukraine. There were twenty-nine polling stations in Bilovodsk Raion. Turnout was 27.10%; 4,923 out of 18,165 voters voted. Petro Poroshenko won a plurality of votes with 33.29% (1,639 votes). Other candidates that received significant shares of the vote included Serhiy Tihipko with 17.71% (872 votes), Yulia Tymoshenko with 7.66% (377 votes), Petro Symonenko with 6.60% (325 votes), and Mykhailo Dobkin with 6.54% (322 votes). The amount of invalid ballots was 5.67%.

On 29 October 2017, Bilovodsk settlement hromada was established as the only hromada in Bilovodsk Raion.

Bilovodsk Raion was abolished on 18 July 2020 as part of the administrative reform of Ukraine, which reduced the number of raions of Luhansk Oblast to eight, of which only four were controlled by the government. The area of Bilovodsk Raion was merged into Starobilsk Raion. Bilovodsk settlement hromada still exists in Starobilsk Raion and has the same territorial extent as the former raion.

=== Re-establishment by Russia ===
Following the Russian invasion of Ukraine in 2022, the territory of the former raion was occupied by Russia and the Luhansk People's Republic (LPR), an unrecognized Russian puppet state claiming the territory of Luhansk Oblast. The raion was re-established by the occupiers as an administrative division of the LPR. Vitaly Kovalenko was appointed head of the re-established Bilovodsk Raion.

On 4 August 2022, Ukrainian partisans shot at a car carrying Kovalenko and his deputy Valentyna Hladkova, wounding both. The two had been on their way from the village Horodyshche, where Kovalenko lives. Hladkova is a former member of the raion council for Servant of the People. Her husband had also been suspected of collaborationism before being killed on 5 June, earlier that year.

In November 2023, the Luhansk Oblast Prosecutor's Office announced they would be prosecuting the so-called "head of the administration of the Bilovodsky District of the LPR" as well as the "deputy" for collaborationism with Russia.

== Economy ==
According to official Soviet-era sources, the main economy of the raion was agriculture, especially grain farming and animal husbandry.

The H26 highway also runs through the raion.

== Demographics ==
As of the last estimate of the raion's population in 2020, it had 22,856 people.

As of the 2001 Ukrainian census, the raion had a large ethnic majority of Ukrainians (87.8%), with a significant minority of Russians (11.2%) and a small minority of Belarusians (0.3%).
