= Markivka settlement hromada =

Markivka settlement hromada Марківська селищна громада
- Hromada
- Interactive map of Markivka settlement hromada
- Country: Ukraine
- Oblast: Luhansk
- Raion: Starobilsk

Area
  - Total: 1,166.8 km^{2} (450.5 sq mi)

Population (2020)
  - Total: 14,020
  - Density: 12.02/km^{2} (31.12/sq mi)
- Settlements: 34
- Villages: 33
- Towns: 1

Markivka settlement hromada (Ukrainian: Марківська селищна громада) is a hromada of Ukraine, located in Starobilsk Raion, Luhansk Oblast. Its administrative center is the town of Markivka.

It has an area of 1,166.8 square kilometres (450.5 mi^{2}) and a population of 14,020, as of 2020.

The hromada contains 34 settlements: 1 town (Markivka) and 33 villages:

- Bondarivka
- Bondarne
- Vesele
- Vynohradne
- Vysochynivka
- Heraskivka
- Heraskivske
- Horodyshche
- Derkulove
- Kaskivka
- Kabychivka
- Karavan-Solodky
- Krasne Pole
- Kreidyane
- Kryzke
- Krupchanske
- Kuryachivka
- Lisna Polyana
- Lypove
- Lymarivka
- Lobasove
- Markivske
- Nova Ukraina
- Pervomaiske
- Prosyane
- Rossohuvate
- Rudivka
- Sychanske
- Sychivka
- Skorodna
- Ternivka
- Tyshkivka
- Fartukivka

== See also ==
- List of hromadas of Ukraine
