= Bilolutsk =

Urban locality in Luhansk Oblast, Ukraine

Bilolutsk Білолуцьк
- Rural settlement
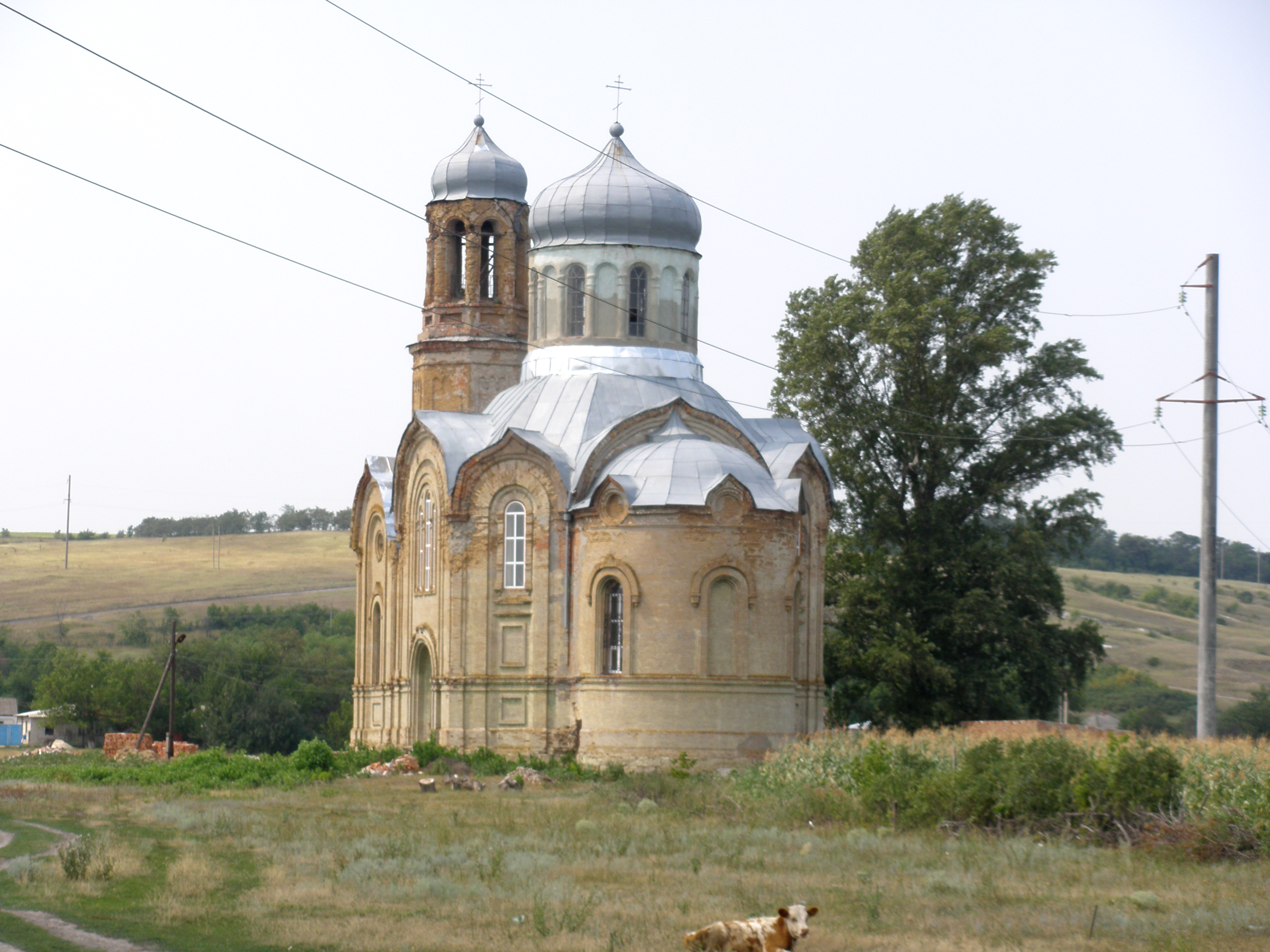

- Location in Luhansk Oblast Location in Ukraine
- Coordinates: 49°41′57″N 39°1′42″E
- Country: Ukraine
- Oblast: Luhansk Oblast
- Raion: Starobilsk Raion
- Hromada: Bilolutsk settlement hromada

Government
  - Mayor: Serhiy Poltenko
- Elevation: 68 m (223 ft)

Population (2022)
  - Total: 3,695
- Time zone: UTC+2 (EET)
  - Summer (DST): UTC+3 (EEST)

Bilolutsk (Ukrainian: Білолуцьк, Russian: Белолуцк) is a rural settlement in the Starobilsk Raion of Luhansk Oblast in Ukraine. Prior to 2020, it was located in the Novopskov Raion. Population: 3,695 (2022 estimate)

== Demographics ==
As of the 2001 Ukrainian census, the settlement had a population of 4,236. The native language composition was as follows:

Native languages in Bilolutsk
| Languages | percent |
| Ukrainian | 94.6% |
| Russian | 4.8% |
| Belarusian | 0.2% |
| Armenian | 0.1% |
| others | 0.3% |
