= Komyshna =

- Native name: Комишна (Ukrainian)

Location
- Country: Russia, Ukraine
- Region: Rostov Oblast, Luhansk Oblast

Physical characteristics
- Source
  - location: Mykilske
  - coordinates: 49°29′46″N 35°55′21″E
- Mouth
  - location: Polnaya
  - coordinates: 48°55′33″N 39°55′16″E
- Length: 95 km (59 mi)
- Basin size: 1,180 km^{2} (460 sq mi)

Basin features
- Progression: Polnaya→ Derkul→ Donets→ Don→ Sea of Azov

The Komyshna (Ukrainian: Комишна) or Kamyshnaya (Russian: Камышная) is a river in the Rostov Oblast of Russia and the Luhansk Oblast of Ukraine, and a right tributary of the Polnaya (Povna).

It has a length of 95 km, and its drainage basin covers 1205 square kilometers.
