= Leonida Svitlychna =

Ukrainian dissident

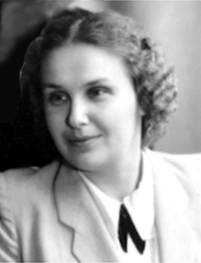
Leonida Svitlychna, 1957

Leonida Pavlivna Svitlychna (née Tereshchenko; Ukrainian: Леоніда Павлівна Світлична; 2 April 1924 – 18 February 2003) was a Ukrainian human rights activist and dissident. She was the wife of Ukrainian poet and writer Ivan Svitlychnyi.

== Biography ==
Leonida was born on April 2, 1924, in Kyiv. Her father, Pavlo Tereshchenko, was an architecture student, and her mother was a housewife. During her youth, she and her family had to live in a cell of the Florivsky Monastery in Kyiv due to lack of accommodation.

In 1940, she enrolled in the Institute of Civil Engineering. In 1941, in occupied Kyiv, she became a student at the Medical Institute, then at the Hydromelioration Institute, which were the only educational institutions to remain active under German rule. This allowed her to avoid being taken to Germany for forced labor. In 1944, she continued her studies at the Institute of Civil Engineering, graduating in 1948. In order to evade capture, Leonida was forced to hide in a crypt at the Baikove Cemetery.

After the return of Soviet regime, Leonida was not admitted to the postgraduate program, being accused of having been in occupied territory. Later, she was admitted to the postgraduate program at the Institute of Building Mechanics. After completing her postgraduate studies, she worked as an assistant at the Institute of Civil Engineering. During that time Leonida took part in works on the projects of Kyiv bridges.

In 1953, while working at the Vernadsky Library, Leonida met her future husband Ivan Svitlychnyi. On January 30, 1956, the couple married. They lived in her mother's room in Kyiv, where her brother's family also resided. In 1960, they received a small one-room apartment. Together with her husband, she participated in the activities of the Artistic Youths' Club and joined the dissident movement.

Her husband was convicted in early 1972 to seven years in labor camps and five years in exile. During this time she helped him by passing translations and information to the outside world. She also assisted the families of prisoners. Along with Vira Lisova and Mykhailyna Kotsiubynska, she managed the Solzhenitsyn Fund in Ukraine. She also cared for the one-and-a-half-year-old son of Ivan's sister, Nadiya Svitlychna. After Nadiya's arrest, her son Yarema was sent to an orphanage in Vorzel, but Leonida managed to find him and brought him to his grandmother in the Luhansk region.

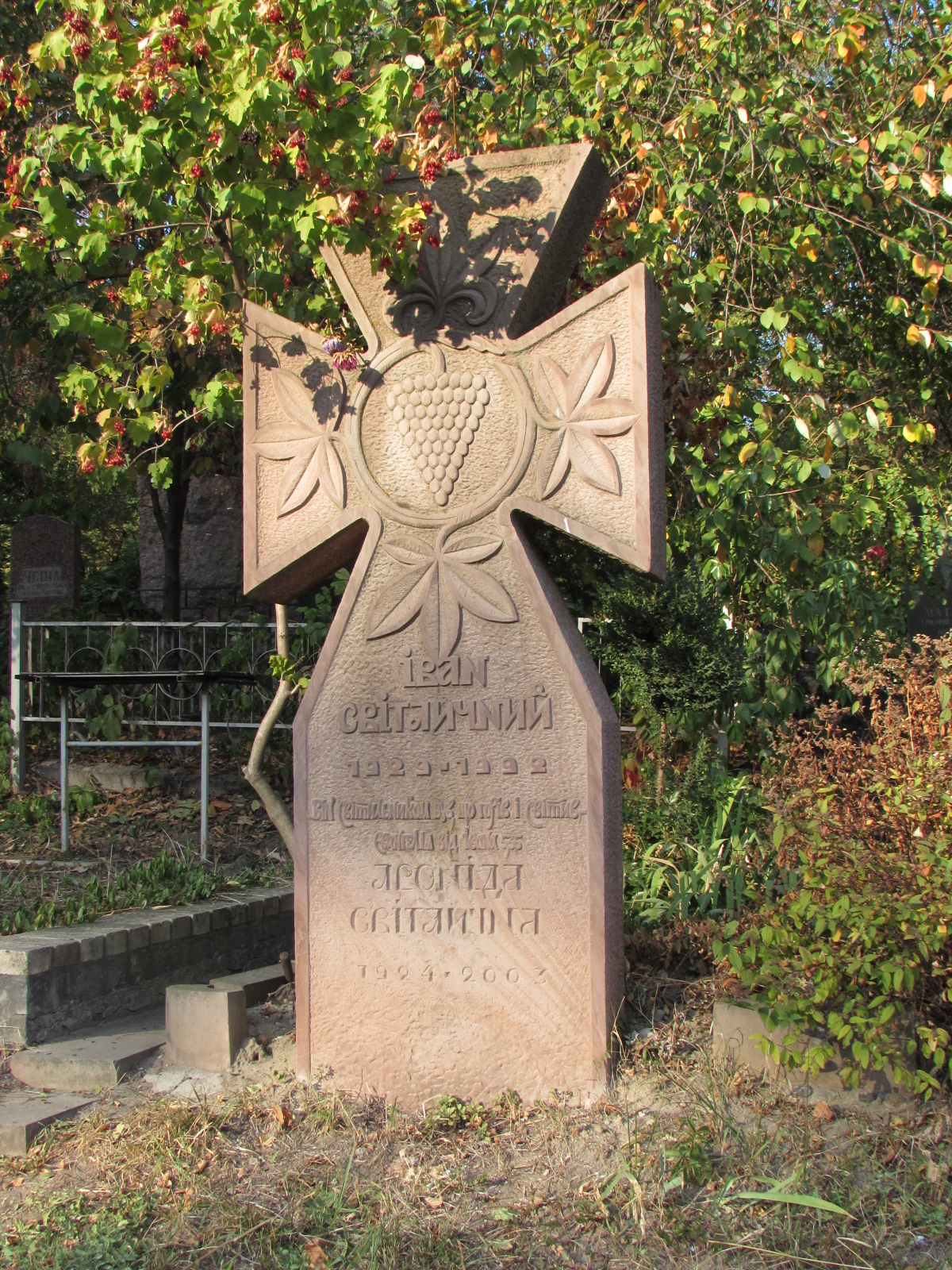
Grave of Ivan and Leonida Svitlychna on the Baikove Cemetery

In 1979, she went to Gorno-Altai to join her husband during his imprisonment in a labour camp. When Ivan suffered a stroke in August 1981, she stayed with him in the hospital for nine months, working as a nurse and in the kitchen. Since Ivan was not released early, she lived with him in a dormitory for the remaining 18 months of his sentence. In January 1983, she brought her husband back to Kyiv so she could care for him.

In 1989, she and Ivan prepared his book "A Heart for Bullets and Rhymes" for publication (which was awarded the Shevchenko National Prize in 1994). After Ivan's death, she and Nadiya Svitlychna prepared the poetry collection "I Have Only the Word" (published in 1994) and a book of memoirs about Ivan Svitlychny titled "Dobrookyi" (published in 1998), along with a collection of letters from the labor camp.

Leonida Svitlychna died on February 18, 2003, at the age of 78 in Kyiv. She is buried next to her husband at Baikove Cemetery.

== Selected publications ==
- Leonida Svitlychna wrote several memoirs, including "Dobrookyi" and "Unwritten Letters Do Not Reach" (published under the title "Ivan Svitlychny. The Voice of the Era").
- Svitlychna, Leonida; Svitlychni, Nadiia (1998). Dobrookyj: spohady pro Ivana Svitlyčnoho (in Czech). Kyïv: Vydavn. ČAS. ISBN 966-95238-2-6.
