= Shulhynka rural hromada =

Shulhynka rural hromada Шульгинська селищна громада
- Hromada
- Interactive map of Shulhynka rural hromada
- Country: Ukraine
- Oblast: Luhansk
- Raion: Starobilsk

Area
  - Total: 337.6 km^{2} (130.3 sq mi)

Population (2020)
  - Total: 4,286
  - Density: 12.70/km^{2} (32.88/sq mi)
- Settlements: 12
- Villages: 12

Shulhynka rural hromada (Ukrainian: Шульгинська селищна громада) is a hromada of Ukraine, located in Starobilsk Raion, Luhansk Oblast. Its administrative center is the village of Shulhynka.

It has an area of 337.6 square kilometres (130.3 mi^{2}) and a population of 4,286, as of 2020.

The hromada contains 12 settlements, which are all villages:

- Baidivka
- Valuiky
- Kamianka
- Lozovivka
- Lozuvatka
- Malokhatka
- Novoastrakhanske
- Omelkove
- Orlivka
- Fedchyne
- Khvorostyanivka
- Shulhynka

== See also ==
- List of hromadas of Ukraine
