= Polnaya =

- Native name: Полная (Russian)

Location
- Country: Russia, Ukraine
- Region: Rostov Oblast, Luhansk Oblast

Physical characteristics
- Source
  - location: Mikhailovo-Alexandrovka, Chertkovsky District
  - coordinates: 49.1103°N 40.2745°E
- Mouth: Derkul
  - coordinates: 48°54′3″N 39°50′1″E
- Length: 79 km (49 mi)
- Basin size: 2,390 km^{2} (920 sq mi)

Basin features
- Progression: Derkul→ Donets→ Don→ Sea of Azov

Polnaya (Russian: Полная; Ukrainian: Повна, romanized: Povna) is a river in the Rostov Oblast of Russia and the Luhansk Oblast of Ukraine, the left and largest tributary of Derkul. It is 79 kilometres (49 mi) long, and has a drainage basin of 2,390 square kilometres (920 sq mi). Its largest tributary is the Komyshna.
