= Bilovodsk settlement hromada =

Bilovodsk settlement hromada Біловодська селищна громада
- Hromada
- Interactive map of Bilovodsk settlement hromada
- Country: Ukraine
- Oblast: Luhansk
- Raion: Starobilsk

Area
  - Total: 1,596.0 km^{2} (616.2 sq mi)

Population (2020)
  - Total: 22,610
  - Density: 14.17/km^{2} (36.69/sq mi)
- Settlements: 33
- Villages: 32
- Towns: 1

Bilovodsk settlement hromada (Ukrainian: Біловодська селищна громада) is a hromada of Ukraine, located in Starobilsk Raion, Luhansk Oblast. Its administrative center is the town of Bilovodsk.

== Extent ==
It has an area of 1,596.0 square kilometres (616.2 mi^{2}) and a population of 22,610, as of 2020.

The hromada contains 33 settlements: 1 town (Bilovodsk) and 32 villages:

- Baranykivka
- Brusivka
- Vitrohon
- Harmashivka
- Honcharove
- Horodyshche
- Horodnye
- Danilivka
- Yevsuh
- Zelekivka
- Kononivka
- Kopani
- Kreidyane
- Limarivka
- Lytvynivka
- Nizhnyobaranikivka
- Novoderkul
- Novolymarivka
- Novoaleksandrivka
- Novospasivka

== History ==
Bilovodsk settlement hromada was established on 29 October 2017, as the only hromada of Bilovodsk Raion. Bilovodsk Raion was abolished on 18 July 2020 as part of the administrative reform of Ukraine, and Bilovodsk settlement hromada was transferred to Starobilsk Raion.

The territory of the hromada was taken over by Russia and its proxies during the Russian invasion of Ukraine in 2022.

On 22 August 2022, head of the Luhansk Oblast military administration Serhii Haidai reported on Russia's indoctrination of Ukrainian children, saying that "a solemn oath-taking and initiation of 30 school-aged children into the military-patriotic 'Young Guard' movement" took place in the village Novoderkul. This took place on the 225th anniversary of the founding of Novoderkul.

== See also ==
- List of hromadas of Ukraine
