= Ivan Svitlychnyi =

Ukrainian Soviet writer and poet (1929–1992)

- Іван Світличний
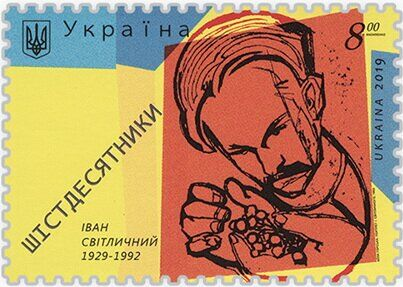
- Svitlychnyi on a 2019 Ukrainian stamp
- Born: 20 September 1929; Polovynkyne, Ukrainian SSR, Soviet Union
- Died: 25 October 1992 (aged 63); Kyiv, Ukraine
- Education: Kharkov University
- Occupations: literary critic, translator, editor
- Known for: Soviet dissident
- Movement: Sixtiers
- Spouse: Leonida Svitlychna
- Relatives: Nadiya Svitlychna (sister)

Ivan Oleksiyovych Svitlychnyi (Ukrainian: Іван Олексійович Світличний; 20 September 1929 – 25 October 1992) was a Ukrainian poet, literary critic, dissident and victim of Soviet political repressions. Fellow inmate Vasyl Ovsiyenko described him as the central figure of the Ukrainian Sixtiers movement.

== Biography ==
=== Early life ===
Ivan Svitlychnyi was born on 20 September 1929 in Polovynkyne, Luhansk Oblast to a family of farmers. As a child, he survived the Holodomor and the early death of his father, which forced him to do adult man's work at an early age. During the German occupation, he lost phalanx bones on a number of fingers as a result of an accident, but continued to work, taking part-time jobs as a bookcase builder, watch repairer and construction worker.

After finishing school with a golden medal, Svitlychnyi went to study in Kharkiv. As a student, he used money received from scholarship to purchase numerous books for self-education. In 1952, he graduated from the philological faculty at Kharkiv University. Svitlychnyi then moved to Kyiv in order to work on his PhD dissertation at the Shevchenko Institute of Literature. However, he was prevented from publishing his scientific paper and attaining the degree.

From 1954 to 1965, Svitlychnyi worked as an editor at the literary magazine Dnipro. He was also employed as a secretary of a literary studies magazine and a junior fellow at the Institute of Literature and Institute of Philosophy at the Academy of Sciences of Ukrainian SSR.

=== Dissident activities and first arrest ===
Svitlychnyi became close to Vasyl Symonenko and helped circulate his poems in samizdat (typescript literature) and magnitizdat (unofficial audio tape recordings). Svitlychnyi's poetry in turn was translated into Russian by dissident Yuli Daniel. He was a personal acquaintance of Daniel and Alexander Solzhenitsyn, and made travels to Moscow, Tula and Tallinn to establish contacts in dissident circles. Together with Hryhoriy Kochur, Svitlychnyi created an anthology of modern French poetry, and translated literary works from French, Polish and Serbian language.

Svitlychnyi was critical of the Russification and arrests of Ukrainian intelligentsia under the Soviet regime. In the early 1960s, he became one of the founders of the Club of Creative Youth in Kyiv. The club of Ukrainian left-wing intellectuals was closely watched by the Ukrainian KGB. In August 1965, he was arrested for his involvement in the club and was imprisoned for eight months in a labour camp.

=== Liberation and second arrest ===
After liberation, Svitlychnyi was prevented from continuing his professional activities. In 1968 his publication concerning the Ukrainian Workers' and Peasants' Union was published by the Suchasnist magazine in Munich. He also helped spread Vasyl Symonenko's diaries and organized the underground publication of works by Mykhaylo Osadchy and Vasyl Stus. In January 1972, along with 18 others, he was arrested in connection with the case of Yaroslav Dobosh, a 24-year-old Belgian of Ukrainian roots who had been recruited by a Ukrainian nationalist organisation to distribute anti-Communist literature in Ukraine. Svitlychnyi was among Dobosh's main contacts. In April 1973 he was sentenced to seven years of forced labour and five years of exile. He served his time Perm-35 labour camp.

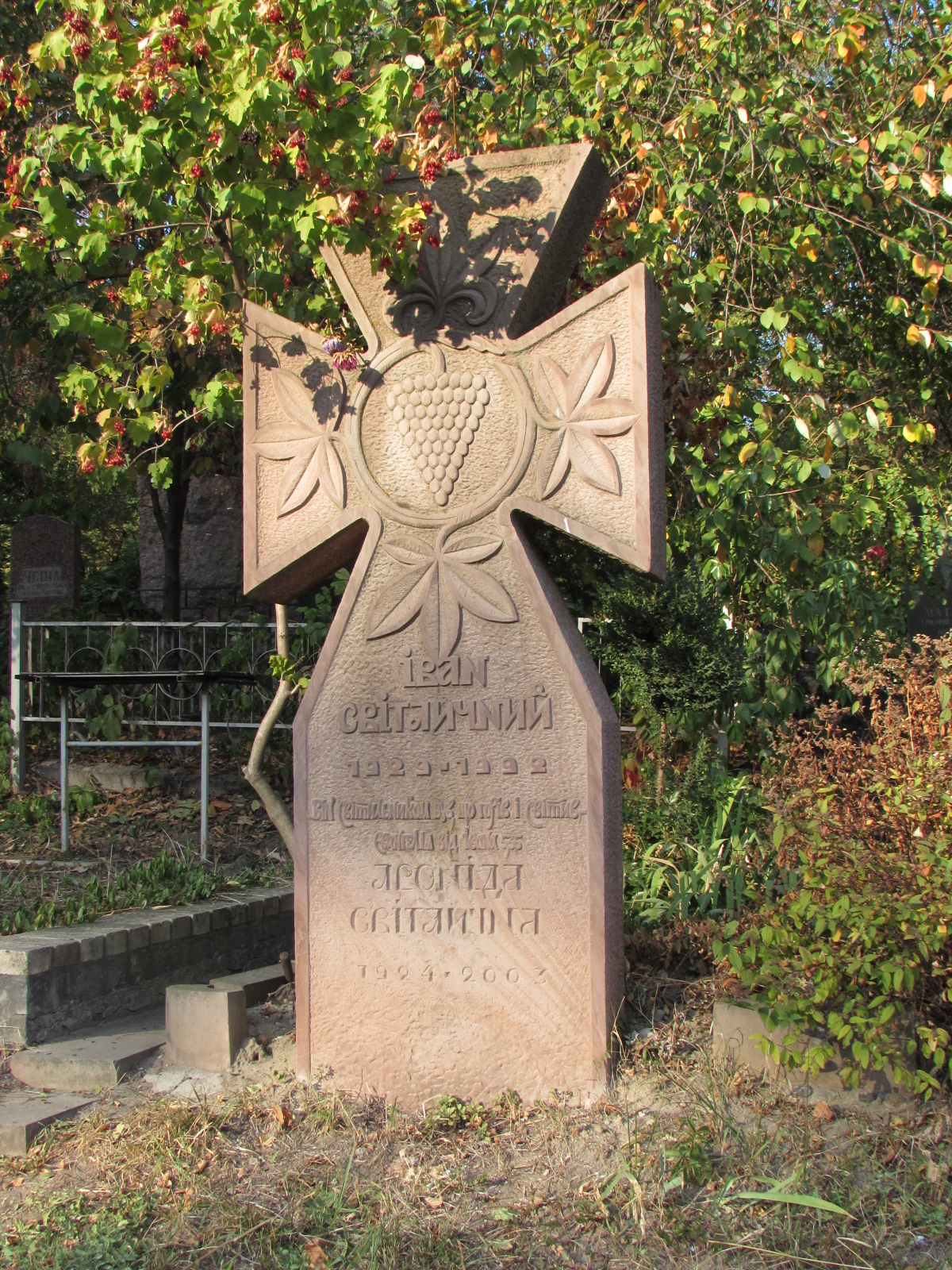
Svitlychnyi's grave on the Baikove Cemetery

In imprisonment, Svilychnyi took part in numerous protests and hunger strikes, after one of which his weight reduced to 44 kilograms. One of his fellow inmates in the camp was Semen Gluzman. In 1977, Andrei Sakharov included Svitlychnyi's name in an appeal to Jimmy Carter.

=== Later years and death ===
In 1981, while still in prison, Svitlychnyi suffered a stroke, which left him paralyzed. He was released in January 1983 and returned in a gravely ill condition. For the last three years of his life he could not move or speak, and was cared for by his wife, Leonida Svitlychna.

Ivan Svitlychnyi died on 25 October 1992 in Kyiv. He was buried at the Baikove Cemetery.

== Literary activities ==
Svitlychnyi was made a member of the International PEN Club in 1978 and became a member of the Union of Writers of Ukraine in 1990. During the 1960s, he became an author of numerous critical articles, some of which laid bare the weaknesses of official Socialist Realist literature. He also took part in discussions on linguistic topics and worked as a translator of Czech (Vitezslav Nezval, František Halas), Slovak (Milan Rúfus) and French (Béranger, Lafontaine, Baudelaire) authors. A part of his translations of Guy de Maupassant were published under the name of Dmytro Palamarchuk (translator). Additionally, Svitlychnyi created his own translation of the Tale of Igor's Campaign. A colection of his own poems was published in 1991.

== Family ==
Svitlychnyi was the brother of dissident and human rights activist Nadiya Svitlychna. His wife Leonida Svitlychna (née Tereshchenko) was fired from her job as a construction engineer due to her husband's activities.

== Awards and honours ==
In 1989 Svitlychny was awarded the Vasyl Stus Prize. In 1994 he was posthumously awarded the Shevchenko National Prize. In 2018 he became a laureate of the Malevich Prize.
