= Bilolutsk settlement hromada =

Bilolutsk settlement hromada Білолуцька селищна громада
- Hromada
- Interactive map of Bilolutsk settlement hromada
- Country: Ukraine
- Oblast: Luhansk
- Raion: Starobilsk

Area
  - Total: 641.2 km^{2} (247.6 sq mi)

Population (2020)
  - Total: 9,662
  - Density: 15.07/km^{2} (39.03/sq mi)
- Settlements: 18
- Rural settlements: 1
- Villages: 16
- Towns: 1

Bilolutsk settlement hromada (Ukrainian: Білолуцька селищна громада) is a hromada of Ukraine, located in Starobilsk Raion, Luhansk Oblast. Its administrative center is the town of Bilolutsk.

It has an area of 641.2 square kilometres (247.6 mi^{2}) and a population of 9,662, as of 2020.

The hromada contains 18 settlements: 1 town (Bilolutsk), 16 villages:

- Berezivka
- Zalisne
- Kozlove
- Kostyantynivka
- Kuban
- Lytvynivka
- Mozhnyakivka
- Novobila
- Pavlenkove
- Pelahiivka
- Svitle
- Synelnikove
- Sosnivka
- Tanyushivka
- Trembacheve
- Shapran

And 1 rural-type settlement: Zeleniy Hai.

== See also ==
- List of hromadas of Ukraine
