= Derkul =

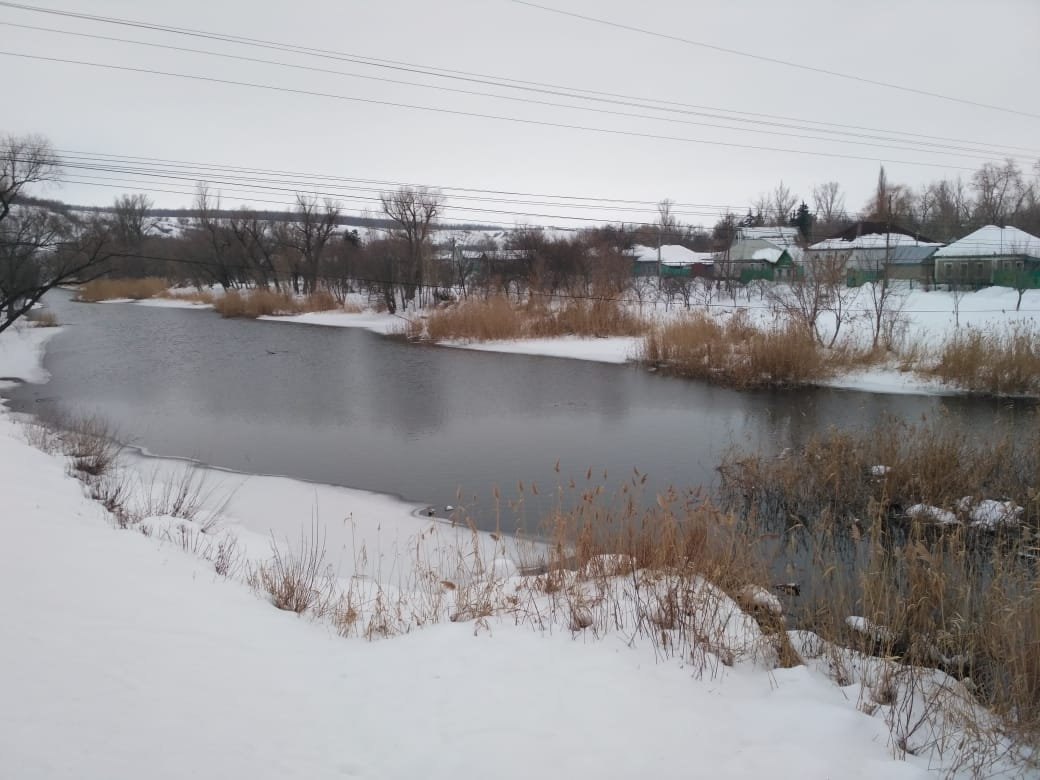
- Native name: Деркул (Ukrainian)

Location
- Country: Russia, Ukraine
- Region: Rostov Oblast, Luhansk Oblast

Physical characteristics
- Source
  - location: Central Russian Upland
  - coordinates: 49°38′1″N 39°38′5″E
- Mouth
  - location: Donets
  - coordinates: 48°35′12″N 39°41′26″E
- Length: 163 km (101 mi)
- Basin size: 5,180 km^{2} (2,000 sq mi)

Basin features
- Progression: Donets→ Don→ Sea of Azov

The Derkul is a left tributary of the Donets located in the Luhansk Oblast of northeast Ukraine, on the border to the Rostov Oblast of Russia. It is 163 kilometres (101 mi) long, and has a catchment area of 5,180 square kilometres (2,000 sq mi). The river in non-navigable.

The Derkul rises north of Markivka in the Ukrainian Luhansk Oblast on the western foothills of the Central Russian Upland. It flows mainly in a southerly direction through a hilly plain in the northeast of the oblast and after 163 km flows on the left into the Siverskyi Donets. In parts of the lower course, it forms a border of the Rostov Oblast of Russia. The Derkul flows through the urban-type settlement of Bilovodsk at the lower reaches. The most important tributary of the Derkul is the Polnaya from the left.

== Archaeology ==
A Lower Paleolithic campsite of Le Moustier era is located near the confluence of Derkul and Donets. It was studied by Petro Yefymenko (1924-1926) and Sergey Zamyatnin (1933).
