= Markivka Raion =

Former subdivision of Luhansk Oblast, Ukraine

Markivka Raion Марківський район
- Raion
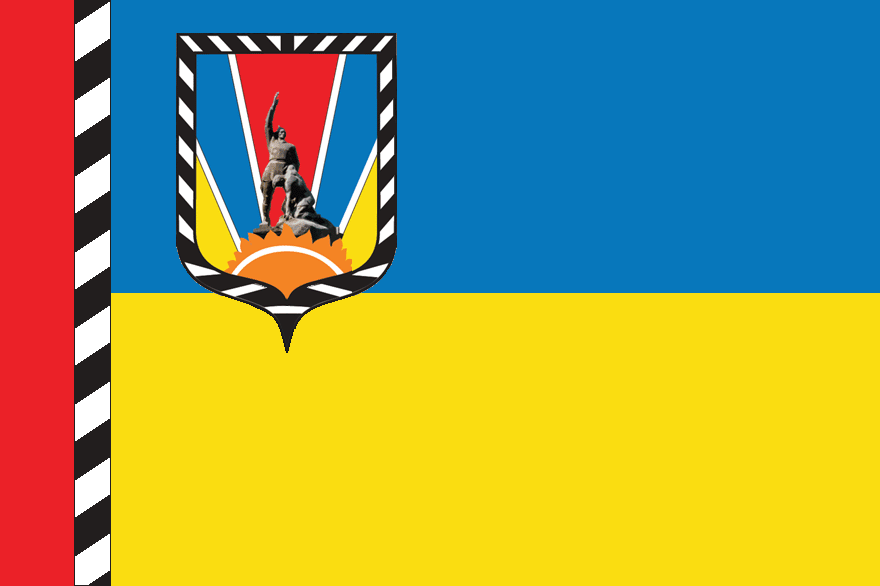
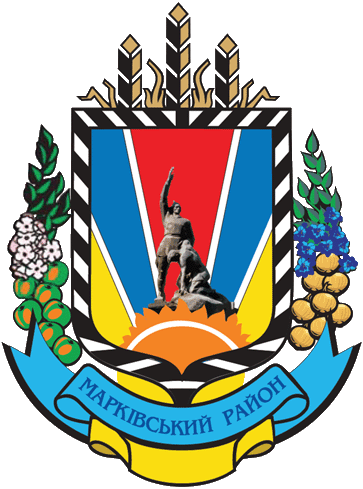
- Flag Coat of arms

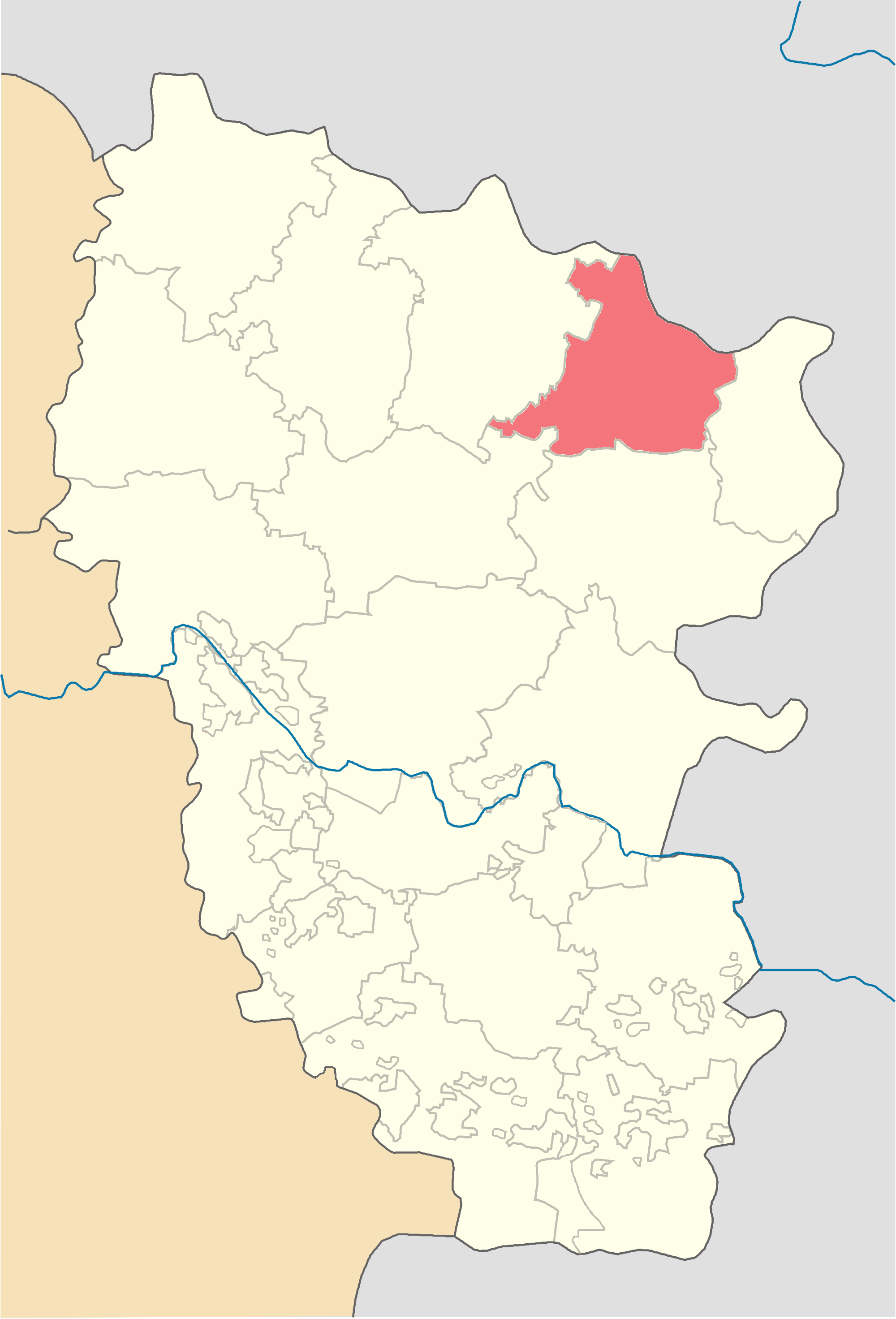
- Coordinates: 49°30′31″N 39°32′53″E
- Country: Ukraine
- Region: Luhansk Oblast
- Established: 1920
- Disestablished: 18 July 2020
- Admin. center: Markivka
- Subdivisions: List: 0 — city councils; 1 — settlement councils; 8 — rural councils; Number of localities: 0 — cities; 1 — urban-type settlements; 33 — villages; 0 — rural settlements

Government
  - Governor: Oleksandr Gnedko

Area
  - Total: 1,166 km^{2} (450 sq mi)

Population (2020)
  - Total: 14,242 ▼
  - Density: 12.21/km^{2} (31.64/sq mi)
- Time zone: UTC+02:00 (EET)
  - Summer (DST): UTC+03:00 (EEST)
- Postal index: 92400—92444
- Area code: +380 6464
- Website: http://mar.loga.gov.ua

Markovsky Municipal District Марковский муниципальный округ (Russian)
- District

Other transcription(s)
  - Ukrainian: Марківський район
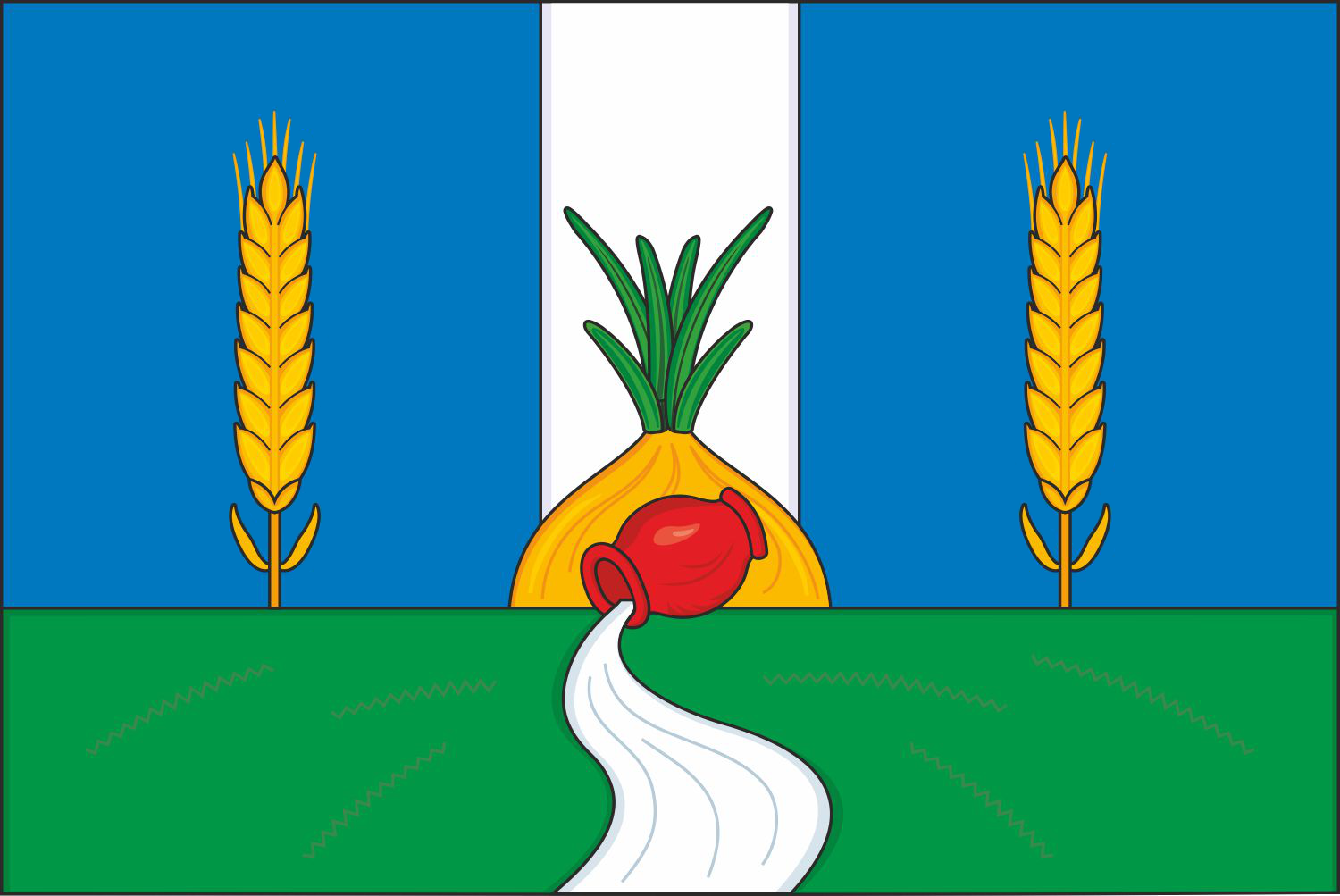
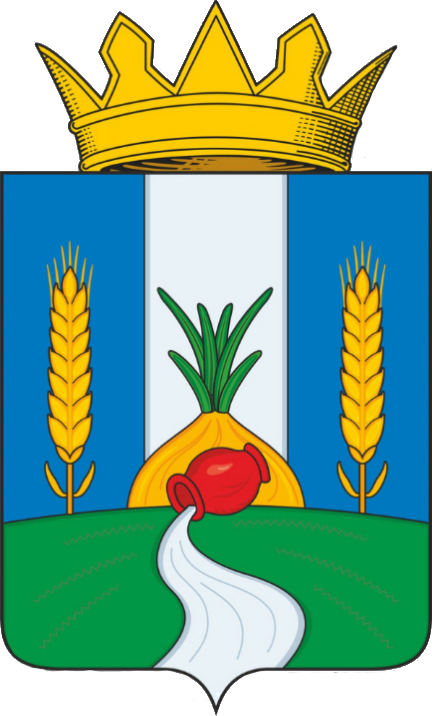
- Flag Coat of arms

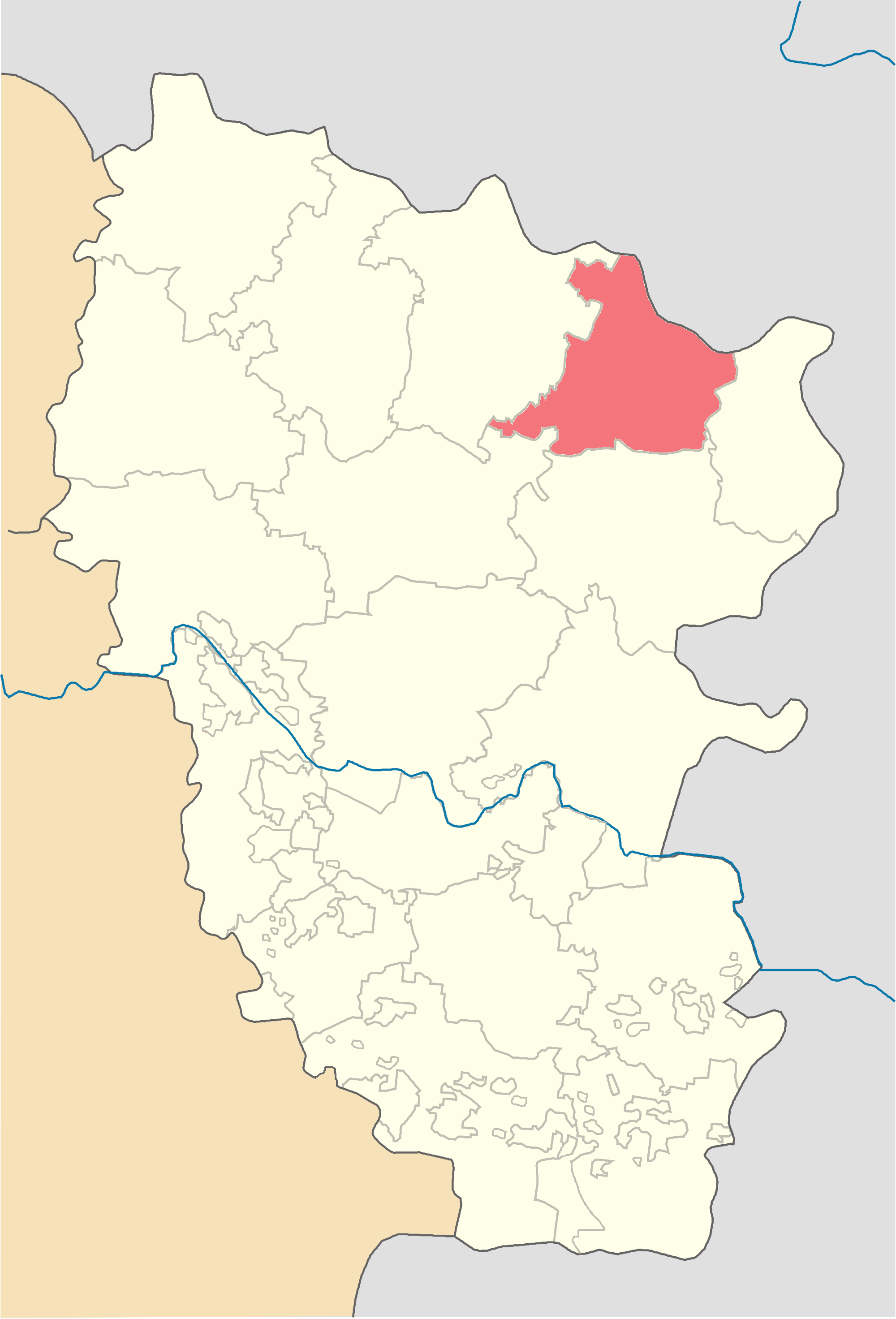
- Location of Markovsky District in the Luhansk People's Republic
- Coordinates: 49°30′31″N 39°32′53″E
- Country: Russia
- Federal subject: Luhansk People's Republic
- Established: 1920
- Administrative center: Markivka

Area
  - Total: 1,166 km^{2} (450 sq mi)
- Website: https://markovka.su

Markivka Raion (Ukrainian: Марківський район) was a raion (district) in Luhansk Oblast of eastern Ukraine. The administrative center of the raion was an urban-type settlement of Markivka. The raion was abolished on 18 July 2020 as part of the administrative reform of Ukraine, which reduced the number of raions of Luhansk Oblast to eight, of which only four were controlled by the government. The last estimate of the raion population was 14,242 (2020 est.).

After the proclamation of the separatist Luhansk People's Republic on 27 April 2014 the province Luhansk became a battlefield of the War in Donbas. Markivka Raion stayed under Ukrainian governmental control. The separatist referendum on 11 May on independence was not held in the Raion.

== Demographics ==
As of the 2001 Ukrainian census:

Ethnicity

- Ukrainians: 93%
- Russians: 5.7%
- Belarusians: 0.4%

== Notable residents ==
- Leonid Zhunko (born 1951), politician, born in Krasne Pole village
