= Chmyrivka rural hromada =

Chmyrivka rural hromada Чмирівська селищна громада
- Hromada
- Interactive map of Chmyrivka rural hromada
- Country: Ukraine
- Oblast: Luhansk
- Raion: Starobilsk

Area
  - Total: 512.6 km^{2} (197.9 sq mi)

Population (2020)
  - Total: 9,077
  - Density: 17.71/km^{2} (45.86/sq mi)
- Settlements: 22
- Rural settlements: 1
- Villages: 21

Chmyrivka rural hromada (Ukrainian: Чмирівська селищна громада) is a hromada of Ukraine, located in Starobilsk Raion, Luhansk Oblast. Its administrative center is the village of Chmyrivka.

It has an area of 512.6 square kilometres (197.9 mi^{2}) and a population of 9,077, as of 2020.

The hromada contains 22 settlements, including 21 villages:

- Antonivka
- Berezove
- Bondareve
- Butove
- Vesele
- Vyshneve
- Zaporizhke
- Zahidne
- Karayashnyk
- Lozove
- Novoomelkovo
- Orikhove
- Petrivske
- Pishchane
- Roszdolne
- Sadky
- Senkove
- Tarabany
- Tetske
- Chmyrivka
- Shpotyne

And 1 rural-type settlement: Stepove.

== See also ==
- List of hromadas of Ukraine
