= Markivka =

Urban locality in Luhansk Oblast, Ukraine

Markivka Марківка
- Rural settlement
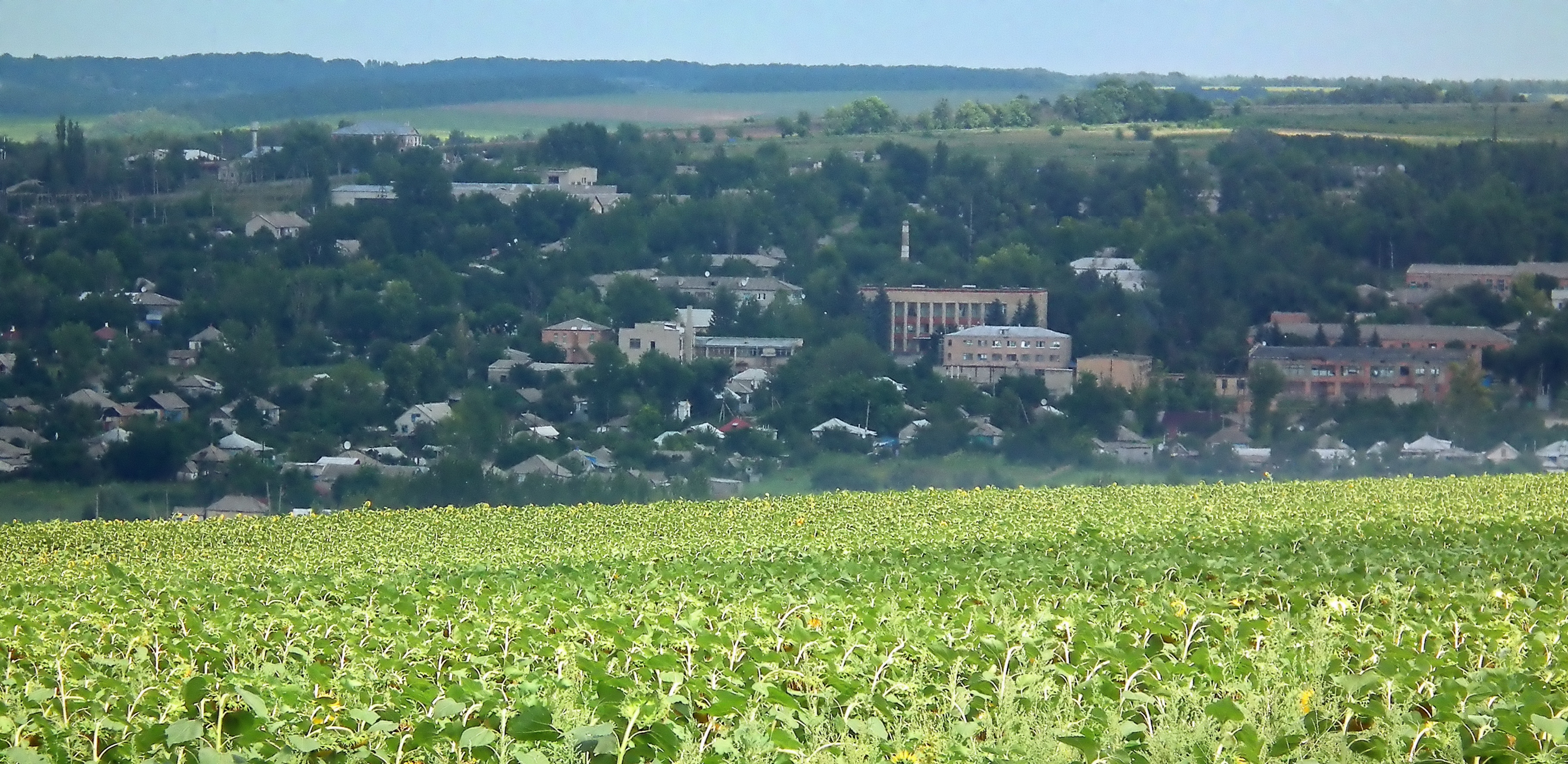
- A view of Markivka

- Location in Ukraine Markivka (Luhansk Oblast)
- Coordinates: 49°31′26″N 39°34′6″E
- Country: Ukraine
- Oblast: Luhansk Oblast
- Raion: Starobilsk Raion

Population (2022)
  - Total: 5,480
- Time zone: UTC+2 (EET)
  - Summer (DST): UTC+3 (EEST)

Markivka (Ukrainian: Марківка; Russian: Марковка, romanized: Markovka) is a rural settlement in the Starobilsk Raion of Luhansk Oblast in the east of Ukraine with the population about 5,480 (2022 estimate). Prior to 2020, it was the administrative center of the former Markivka Raion.

== History ==
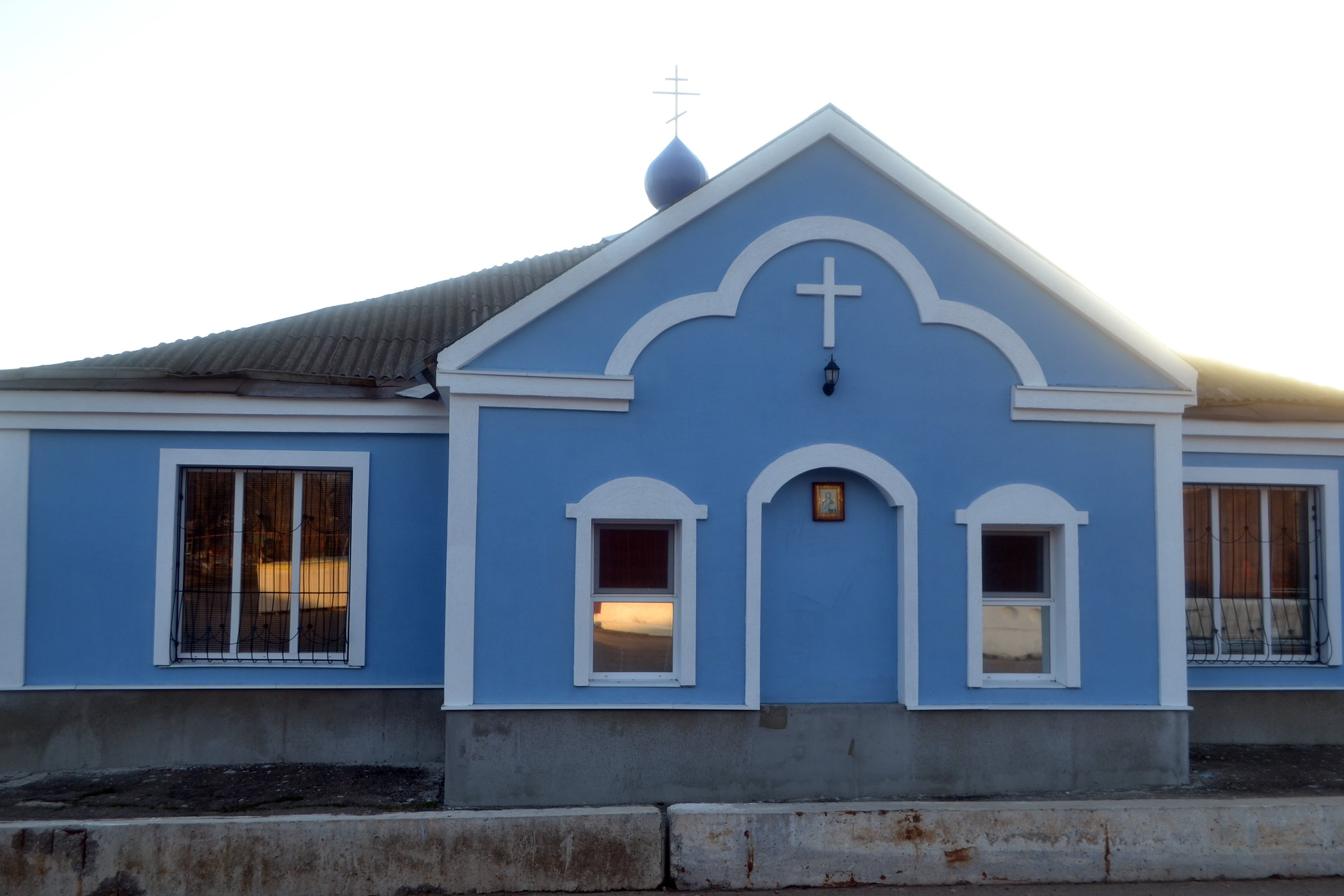
A church in Markivka.

Markivka is one of the oldest settlements in Sloboda Ukraine, as artifacts from the Bronze Age have been found on the territory of the village. It was founded sometime in the latter half of the 17th century by peasants from Chernihiv and Poltava. It is said in folklore that the name of the village comes from the first settler named Marko, who was either a Zaporozhian Cossack or chumak, although research also suggested the name might come from the original name of the village the settlers from Poltava Oblast came from. During the Bulavin Rebellion, the village was a site of the uprising, and so the village was completely destroyed by Russian troops upon retaking it. It took until the late 1720s for the village to be restored. The village grew as an agricultural site, shipping large quantities of wheat to ports on the Sea of Azov. It also grew its own type of onion that was supplied to the USSR and Cuba.

During the Russian Civil War, the village repeatedly changed hands until the Bolsheviks established power in December 1919, but they greatly suffered during the Holodomor in the early 1930s. From 11 July 1942 to January 1943, it was occupied by German troops during World War II. In 1960 it was designated an urban-type settlement in the Ukrainian SSR. On 24 February 2022, during the Russian invasion of Ukraine, it was occupied on the very first day by Russian troops. The mayor of the hromada - who is also head of the village - Ihor Dziuba cooperated with and congratulated Russian authorities upon the village's capture. This led to numerous rallies within the city, which stopped in early March after threats.

== Demographics ==
As of the 2001 Ukrainian census, the town had 7,301 inhabitants. The self-reported native languages were:

Native languages in Markivka
Languages	percent
Ukrainian	93.3%
Russian	6.2%
Armenian	0.2%
Belarusian	0.1%
others	0.1%

== Notable people ==
- Andriy Yeryomenko (1892-1970), Soviet general
