= Starobilsk urban hromada =

Starobilsk urban hromada Старобільська міська громада
- Hromada
- Interactive map of Starobilsk urban hromada
- Country: Ukraine
- Oblast: Luhansk
- Raion: Starobilsk

Area
  - Total: 731.6 km^{2} (282.5 sq mi)

Population (2020)
  - Total: 28,458
  - Density: 38.90/km^{2} (100.7/sq mi)
- Settlements: 25
- Cities: 1
- Villages: 24

Starobilsk urban hromada (Ukrainian: Старобільська міська громада) is a hromada of Ukraine, located in Starobilsk Raion, Luhansk Oblast. Its administrative center is the city Starobilsk.

It has an area of 731.6 square kilometres (282.5 mi^{2}) and a population of 28,458, as of 2020.

The hromada contains 25 settlements: 1 city (Starobilsk), and 24 villages:

- Balakyrivka
- Butkivka
- Verkhnya Pokrovka
- Hannivka
- Dzhemilyne
- Dubovivka
- Yehorivka
- Kalmykivka
- Krynychky
- Kuryachivka
- Levadne
- Lyman
- Marynivka
- Nizhnyopokrovka
- Novoborove
- Novodonbaske
- Novoselivka
- Pidhorivka
- Polovynkyne
- Proyizhdzhe
- Prokazyne
- Svitle
- Sukhanivka
- Tytarivka

== See also ==
- List of hromadas of Ukraine
