= Starobilsk Raion =

Subdivision of Luhansk Oblast, Ukraine

Starobilskyi Raion Старобільський район
- Raion
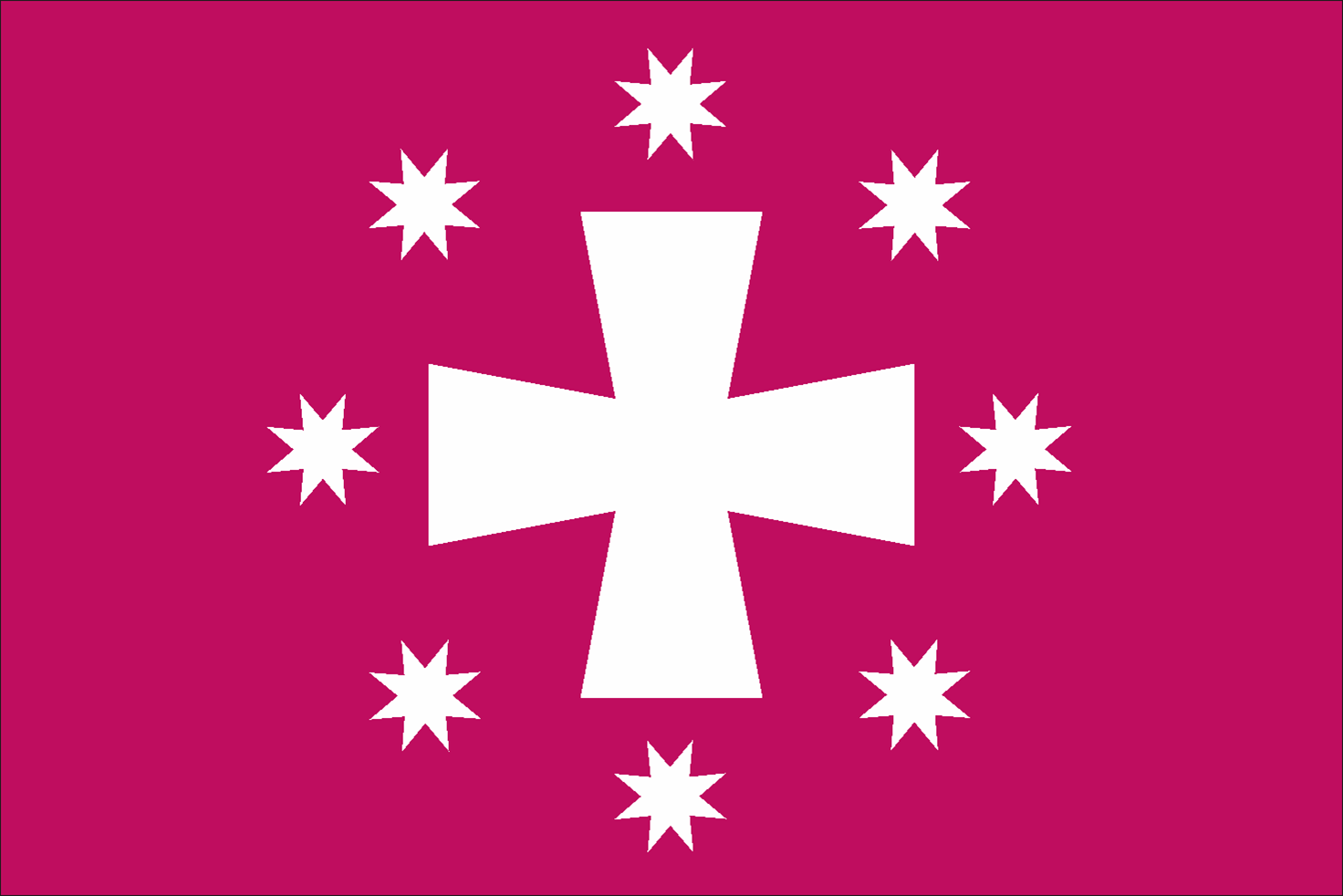
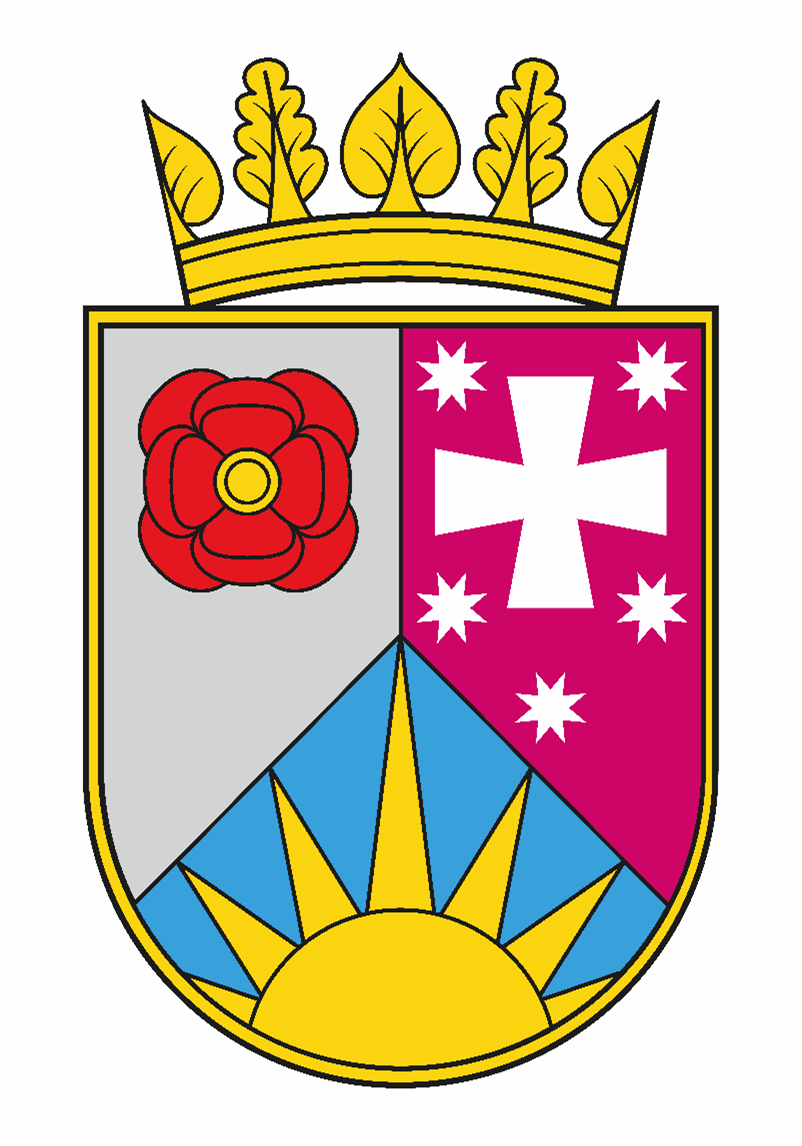
- Flag Coat of arms
- Interactive map of Starobilskyi Raion
- Coordinates: 49°14′59″N 38°55′10″E
- Country: Ukraine
- Oblast: Luhansk Oblast
- Established: 1923
- Admin. center: Starobilsk
- Subdivisions: 8 hromadas

Government
  - Governor: Volodymyr Cherevatyi

Area
  - Total: 6,930.6 km^{2} (2,675.9 sq mi)

Population (2022)
  - Total: 123,833
  - Density: 17.868/km^{2} (46.277/sq mi)
- Time zone: UTC+02:00 (EET)
  - Summer (DST): UTC+03:00 (EEST)
- Postal index: 92700—92764
- Area code: +380 6461
- Website: http://stb.loga.gov.ua

Starobelsk Municipal District Старобельский муниципальный округ (Russian)
- District

Other transcription(s)
  - Ukrainian: Старобільський район
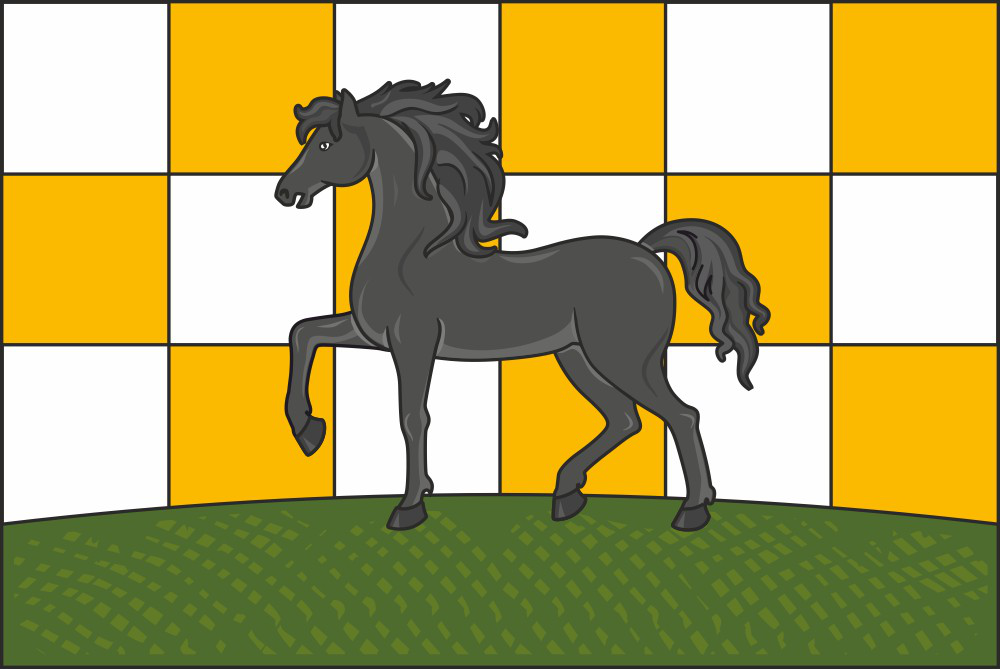
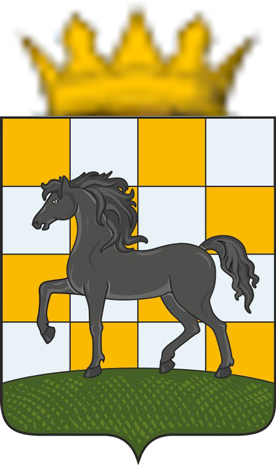
- Flag Coat of arms

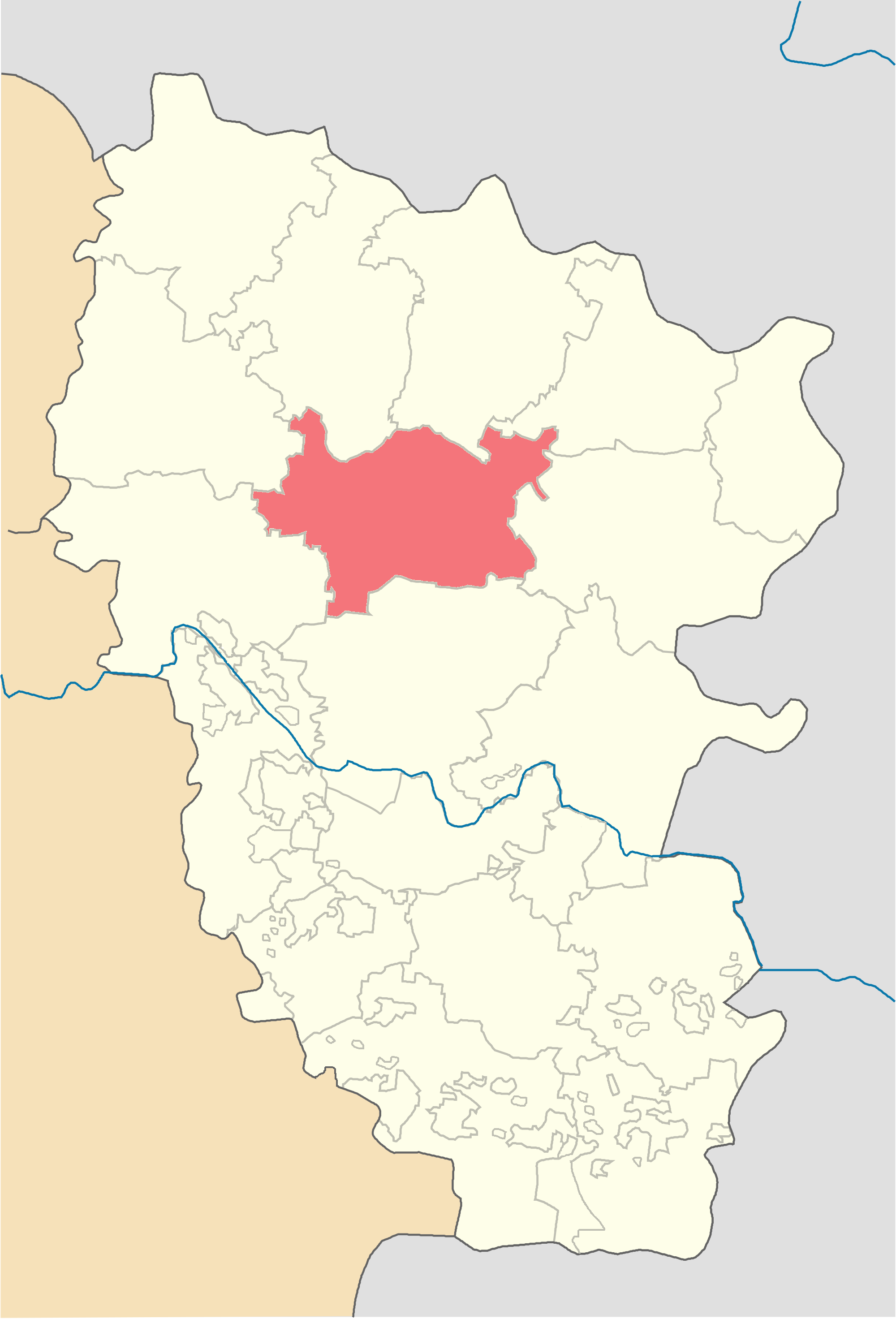
- Location of Perevalsk District in the Luhansk People's Republic
- Coordinates: 49°14′59″N 38°55′10″E
- Country: Russia
- Federal subject: Luhansk People's Republic
- Established: 1923
- Administrative center: Starobelsk

Area
  - Total: 1,580 km^{2} (610 sq mi)
- Website: https://asr-lnr.ru

Starobilsk Raion (Ukrainian: Старобільський район) is a raion (district) in Luhansk Oblast of eastern Ukraine. The administrative center of the district is the town of Starobilsk. Population: 123,833 (2022 estimate).

Its territory was greatly expanded during the 2020 Ukrainian administrative reforms.

== History ==
Starobilsk Raion was established in spring 1923 as an administrative unit of the Ukrainian SSR.

On February 5, 1965, in accordance with a decree of the Presidium of the Verkhovna Rada of the Ukrainian SSR that tweaked administration across the republic, Brusivka rural council was transferred from Starobilsk Raion to Bilovodsk Raion, slightly shrinking the former's territory.

The January 2020 estimate of the raion's population was 42,693 (2020 est.).

On 18 July 2020, as part of the administrative reform of Ukraine, the number of raions of Luhansk Oblast was reduced to eight, of which only four were controlled by the government (see Luhansk People's Republic), and the area of Starobilsk Raion was significantly expanded. Two abolished raions, Chornobai and Drabiv Raions, as well as the city of Starobilsk, which was previously incorporated as a city of oblast significance and did not belong to the raion, were merged into Starobilsk Raion.

== Subdivisions ==
The raion contains eight hromadas:

- Bilolutsk settlement hromada;
- Bilovodsk settlement hromada;
- Chmyrivka rural hromada;
- Markivka settlement hromada;
- Milove settlement hromada;
- Novopskov settlement hromada;
- Shulhynka rural hromada;
- Starobilsk urban hromada.

== Demographics ==
As of the 2001 Ukrainian census:

Ethnicity

- Ukrainians: 87.8%
- Russians: 11%
- Belarusians: 0.3%
