= Opanas Zalyvakha =

Ukrainian artist

- Опанас Іванович Заливаха
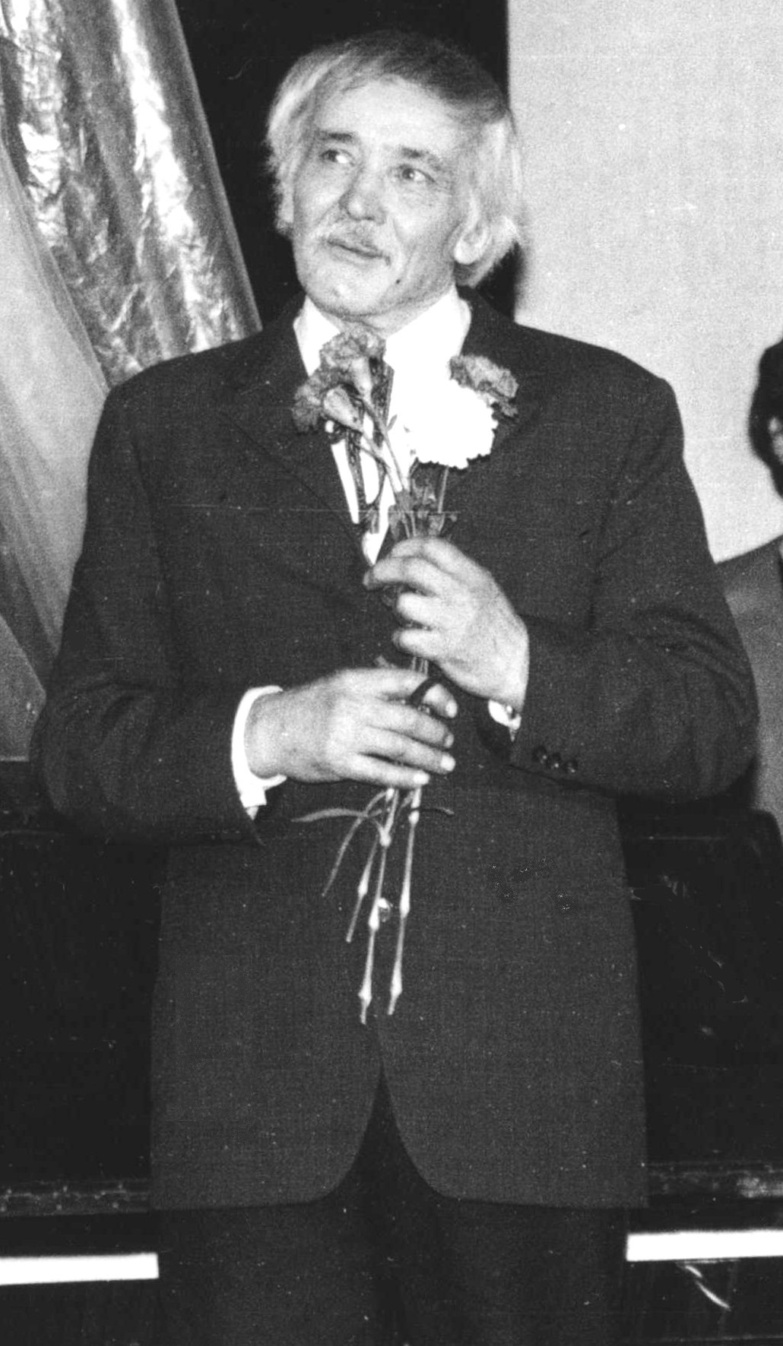
- Opanas Zalyvakha in 1989
- Born: 26 November 1925; Husynka, Kharkiv Oblast, Ukrainian SSR, Soviet Union
- Died: 24 April 2007 (aged 81); Ivano-Frankivsk, Ukraine
- Education: Saint Petersburg Repin Academy of Arts
- Movement: Sixtiers, Ukrainian underground

Opanas Ivanovych Zalyvakha (Ukrainian: Опанас Іванович Заливаха; 26 November 1925 – 24 April 2007) was a Ukrainian artist and Soviet dissident, member of Artistic Youths' Club (1960 - 1964).

== Biography ==
Opanas Zalyvakha was born in the village of Husynka, Kharkiv Oblast. He spent his youth in Siberia, where his family fled from the Holodomor in 1933. His education as a painter stated at the arts school in Blagoveshchensk. Zalyvakha later studied at an arts college in Irkutsk, and during World War II attended courses of the Leningrad Academy of Arts, which was at the time evacuated to Samarkand. He was expelled from the academy for failing to attend a meeting with a candidate from the Communist Party, but was able to get restored as a student and finally graduated in 1960.

In 1957, Zalyvakha completed his training in Kosiv (Hutsul region). During that period he also got acquainted with works of Ukrainian literature, including Taras Shevchenko's Kobzar and Mykhailo Kotsiubynsky's Intermezzo. After completing his studies, he worked for a year as an artist at the Tyumen Art Fund, after which he moved to Ivano-Frankivsk. Here, the artist's first exhibition took place at the regional museum of local history. It lasted two weeks. Opanas Zalyvakha placed a notebook for comments in the hall and received mixed reviews. The exhibition was closed after only 10 days on the order of local authorities, as the artists' style was demed to be too modern and national-oriented. Some of his early works found their way abroad and gained popularity, and Zalyvakha received an invitation to organise an exhibition in New York.

In 1962, Zalyvakha joined activities of the Artistic Youths' Club in Kyiv, which would eventually become a centre of dissident activities. There he befriended Alla Horska, Liudmyla Semykina, Halyna Sevruk, Ivan Svitlychnyi and Yevhen Sverstiuk. Together with Horska, Semykina, Sevruk and Halyna Zubchenko, he worked on the stained glass window "Shevchenko. Mother", created for the 150th anniversary of Taras Shevchenko in the lobby of the Red Building of Kyiv National University. However, a commission convened by the Communist Party leadership qualified it as ideologically hostile, so the stained glass window was destroyed by the university administration.

In August 1965 Zalyvakha and Svitlychnyi were arrested on accusations of anti-Soviet agitation and sentenced to 5 years of imprisonment in labour camps of Mordovia. Among Zalyvakha's cellmates in prison was the dissdent Mykhailo Soroka. Zalyvakha was forbidden to paint, and his bookplates were confiscated. Although his colleagues repeatedly appealed for Opanas to be allowed to paint, they never received permission.

He recalled his imprisonment: "I was already living in a general prison called the USSR. First there was boarding school, then university in Leningrad. And everywhere they gave you food rations, of course, if you were “obedient”. And then in prison they also gave you rations. The authorities always tried to allocate rations in everything: in food and in creativity. That's how the state was. Everything was allocated according to the quota."

In 1968, he signed the ‘Letter of 139’, an open public letter addressed to Leonid Brezhnev, Alexei Kosygin and Nikolai Podgorny demanding an end to the practice of illegal political trials.

In the winter of 1969, Alla Horska visited Opanas Zalyvakha in the Mordovian concentration camp zone. On 28 August 1970, when he was released from prison, she played an active role in organising a grand welcome for him at the 'Natalka' restaurant in Kyiv. She was murdered that same year.

Following his release, Zalyvakha remained in contact with dissident groups, and was constantly supervised by the KGB. In 1980 the artist's home was searched by the secret police, whose agents confiscated his library and part of his works.

In the late years of perestroika and after Ukraine declared independence, his work received well-deserved recognition, and exhibitions of his works were organised in Ukraine and abroad, encompassing cities such as Lviv, Ivano-Frankivsk, Kyiv, Toronto, London and New York. In 1989 Zalyvakha became a laureate of Vasyl Stus Prize. In 1995, he was awarded the Taras Shevchenko State Prize of Ukraine. The artist's first album was released in 2003 by the 'Smoloskyp' publishing house. His works are present in collections of numerous museums and art galleries in Ukraine.

Zalyvakha died on 24 April 2007 in Ivano-Frankivsk.

== Personal life ==
After his release from prison in 1970, Zalyvakha married Daryna Voznyak, a niece of Stepan Bandera, who was also persecuted by Soviet authorities. The couple raised a son, Yaroslav, and a daughter, Yaryna. Daryna Voznyak died on 30 January 2020 at the age of 78.

== Creative work ==
=== Book illustrations ===
- Palimpsests by Vasyl Stus,
- The Prodigal Sons of Ukraine by Yevhen Sverstiuk.

=== Exhibitions ===
In 2024, an exhibition of Zalyvakha's worksopened at the Mercury Art Centre in Lviv.

== Commemoration ==
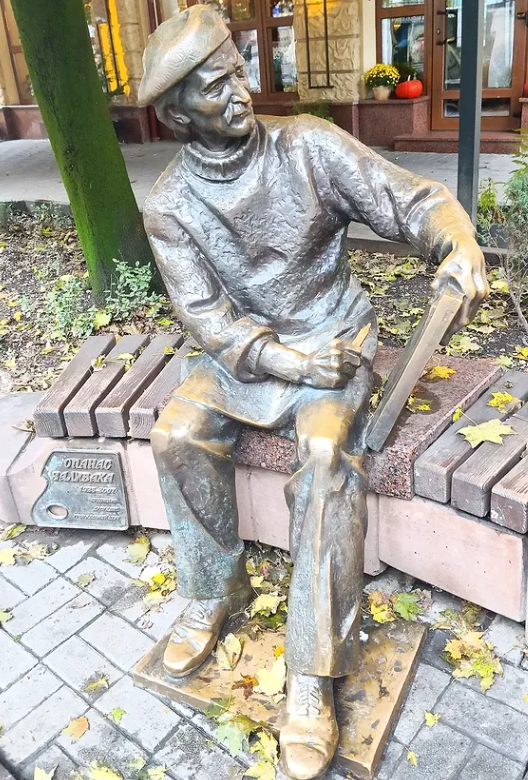
Monument of Opanas Zalyvakha in Ivano-Frankivsk, 2025

A street where Zalyvakha resided in Lviv, previously named after Oleg Koshevoy, has been renamed in his honour.

On 23 November 2017, a monument to the artist (sculptor Ihor Semak) was erected on the pedestrian part of Nezalezhnosti Street in Ivano-Frankivsk.

In 2023, Matrosov Street in Kyiv was renamed Opanas Zalyvakha Street.

In 2024, Griboedov Street in Druzhkivka was renamed Opanas Zalyvakha Street.

== See also ==
- Soviet dissidents
- Ukrainian underground
