= Alla Horska =

Ukrainian artist and Soviet dissident (1929–1970)

- Алла Горська
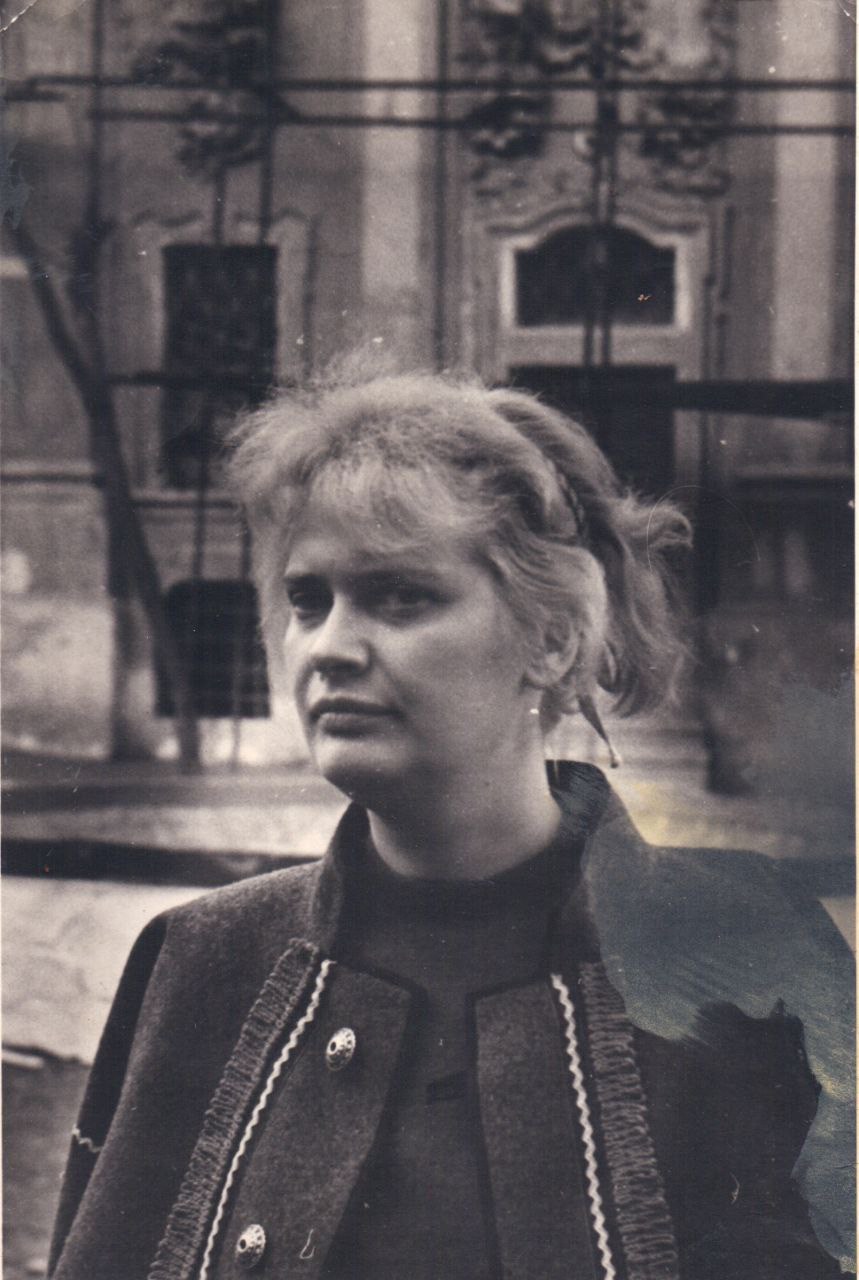
- Born: 18 September 1929; Yalta, Crimean ASSR, Russian SFSR, Soviet Union
- Died: 28 November 1970 (aged 41); Vasylkiv, Ukrainian SSR, Soviet Union
- Cause of death: Murder
- Resting place: Berkovets cemetery
- Education: National Academy of Arts of Ukraine
- Known for: Monument art, paintings, Creative Youth Club "Suchasnyk"
- Movement: Sixtiers, Ukrainian underground
- Spouse: Viktor Zaretsky
- Parents: Oleksandr Horskyi (father); Olena Bezsmertna (mother)

Alla Oleksandrivna Horska (Ukrainian: Алла Олександрівна Горська; 18 September 1929 – 28 November 1970) was a Ukrainian artist and Soviet dissident who was associated with the Ukrainian underground and Sixtier movements during the 1960s. She was murdered in 1970; the official investigation reported at the time that she had been killed by her father-in-law, though Soviet archives have since revealed evidence suggesting the possible involvement of the KGB.

== Early life and family ==
Alla Horska was born on 18 September 1929 in Yalta, a city in Crimea then part of the Russian Soviet Federative Socialist Republic of the Soviet Union. Her father, Oleksandr Horskyi, was a leading manager and organizer of Soviet film production. During the early years of Alla's life, Horskyi worked as an actor in the Yalta Ukrainian theater troupe directed by Pavlo Deliavskyi. In 1931, he became the director of the Yalta Film Studio.

In 1932, he moved with his family to Moscow, where he took on the role of head of production at the "Vostokfilm" trust. Later, he was transferred to Leningrad (now Saint Petersburg), where he first became the deputy director and then the director of the Lenfilm studio.

Horska's mother, Olena Bezsmertna, worked as a caregiver in Yalta children's sanatoriums and later as a costume designer in Leningrad.

From autumn 1939 to spring 1940, Oleksandr Horskyi was involved in the Winter War, and shortly before Operation Barbarossa, he went to Mongolia as the leader of a group for filming the movie His Name Is Sukhe-Bator. During the war, Horskyi was in Almaty, employed at a collaborative film studio. Meanwhile, 11-year-old Alla, along with her mother and her brother Arsen, who was 10 years older, met the war in Leningrad. Arsen was the son of Alla's mother from her first husband, who died in the war in Ukraine in 1918–1919. Alla and her mother survived two blockaded winters in Leningrad and were evacuated to Almaty in the summer of 1943. Arsen was killed during the war in 1943.

At the end of 1943, Alla's father was offered to lead the Kyiv Film Studio of Feature Films. This made the family to move to the capital of Ukraine. They settled in the centre of Kyiv. Later, their apartment, along with Alla Horska's workshop, became a sort of headquarters for dissidents.

Between 1946 and 1948, Horska studied at the Kyiv Art Secondary School named after T. Shevchenko, where she graduated with a gold medal. One of her art instructors was Volodymyr Bondarenko, a former student of Fedir Krychevsky. From 1948 to 1954 she studied at the Kyiv State Art Institute, particularly in the workshop of Serhiy Hryhoriev. It was during her studies that she met her future husband, Viktor Zaretsky.

== Khrushchev Thaw and the Sixtiers ==
Two years after completing her education, Horska began her career in monumental painting. She often traveled to the Donbas with her husband. In 1959, she was admitted to the Union of Artists for her series of paintings on the mining industry.

During the Khrushchev Thaw, Ukrainian culture began to revive, and Horska actively participated in the process of national revival, alongside a generation of young intellectuals known as the Sixtiers. In that period, she transitioned to speaking the Ukrainian language under the guidance of Nadiya Svitlychna; she had previously been raised in a Russophone family.

In the early 1960s, Horska, together with Zaretsky, Vasyl Stus, Vasyl Symonenko, and Ivan Svitlychnyi, organized the Artistic Youths' Club "Suchasnyk" in Kyiv. In addition to them, Ivan Drach, Yevhen Sverstiuk, Iryna Zhylenko, Mykhailyna Kotsiubynska, Mykola Vinhranovsky, Les Tanyuk, and Ivan Dziuba were also involved. The young artists held discussions, artistic evenings, organized exhibitions, engaged in samvydav, and provided each other with moral and material support.

The activities of "Suchasnyk" extended beyond literary events. Along with Symonenko and Tanyuk, Horska discovered the burial sites of thousands of victims of the NKVD (Bykivnia, Lukyanivske, and Vasilkivske cemeteries). They immediately reported their findings to the Kyiv City Council.

=== Repression ===
In 1964, Horska, together with Opanas Zalyvakha, Liudmyla Semykina, Halyna Sevruk, and Halyna Zubchenko, created the stained glass "Shevchenko. Mother" in the vestibule of the main building of Kyiv University. It depicted a poet with a woman leaning against him "symbolizing Mother Ukraine". However, shortly before the unveiling, at the direction of the party leadership, the university administration destroyed it. After this incident, a commission classified the stained glass as ideologically hostile and deeply incompatible with the principles of socialist realism. Horska and Semykina were expelled from the Artists' Union, but they were reinstated a year later.

In 1965, many of Horska's friends were arrested. This period marked the beginning of her active involvement in the Soviet dissident movement, leading to her artistic activities being relegated to the underground. On 16 December 1965, Horska wrote a letter to the prosecutor of the Ukrainian SSR regarding the arrests. Horska corresponded with those who were in camps or experienced other forms of punishment, particularly with Zalyvakha. After returning from the camps, human rights activists turned to her for support, sometimes even staying at her apartment in Kyiv.

Between 1965 and 1968, Horska took part in protests against the repressions of Ukrainian human rights activists, including Bohdan and Mykhailo Horyn, Opanas Zalyvakha, Sviatoslav Karavansky, Valentyn Moroz, Viacheslav Chornovil, and others. Because of this, she was persecuted by the Soviet security services.

In 1968, Horska joined the signing of a public letter addressed to Leonid Brezhnev, Alexei Kosygin, and Nikolai Podgorny, known as "Letter of Protest 139". The letter demanded an end to the practice of illegal political processes and drew attention to the departure from the decisions of the 20th Congress of the Communist Party of the Soviet Union and violations of socialist legality. Administrative repression began against those who signed the letter. Horska was expelled from the Union of Artists for the second time. She would remain under constant KGB surveillance, and repeatedly received threatening phone calls.

In 1970, Horska was summoned to Ivano-Frankivsk for questioning regarding the arrest of Valentyn Moroz, but she refused to answer any questions. Several days before her murder, she wrote a protest to the Supreme Court of the Ukrainian SSR regarding the illegality and cruelty of the verdict.

== Death ==
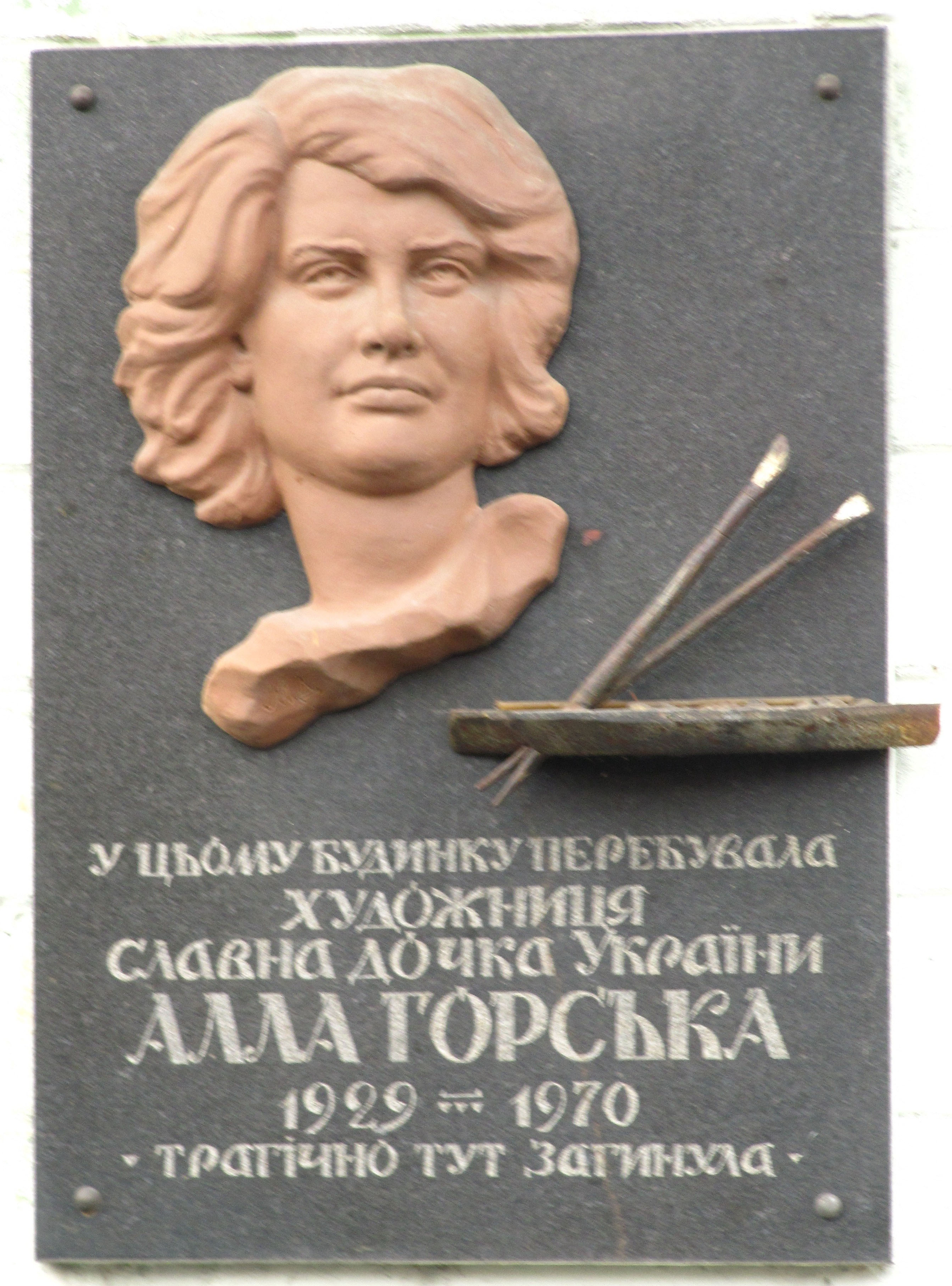
Memorial plaque on the house in Vasylkiv where Horska was murdered

Horska was murdered in 1970 while under surveillance by the KGB. Her funeral was on 7 December 1970.

On 28 November 1970, Horska went to the town of Vasylkiv near Kyiv to pick up a sewing machine from her father-in-law and never returned. Several days later, her body was found in the house of her father-in-law, Ivan Zaretsky. The cause of death was stated as blunt force trauma from a hammer. Zaretsky was already deceased at that time; his mutilated body was found on the railway tracks on 29 November. The investigation was conducted within a month, reaching the conclusion that Zaretsky had killed Horska due to personal animosity before committing suicide by throwing himself under a train. The findings came under immediate suspicion, and rumours spread that Horska had been killed by the KGB. Her funeral turned into a political rally for dissidents. Several of those who spoke at her funeral, including Stus and Sverstiuk, would later be arrested.

38 years after Horska's murder, the State Archives of the Security Service of Ukraine declassified "Fund 16", a group of documents including those relating to her death. These documents were processed and published in 2010 by Horska's son, Oleksii Zaretskyi. Public broadcaster Suspilne Kultura stated in 2024 that there was a "reasonable evidence base" that Horska had been murdered by the KGB.

== Art ==
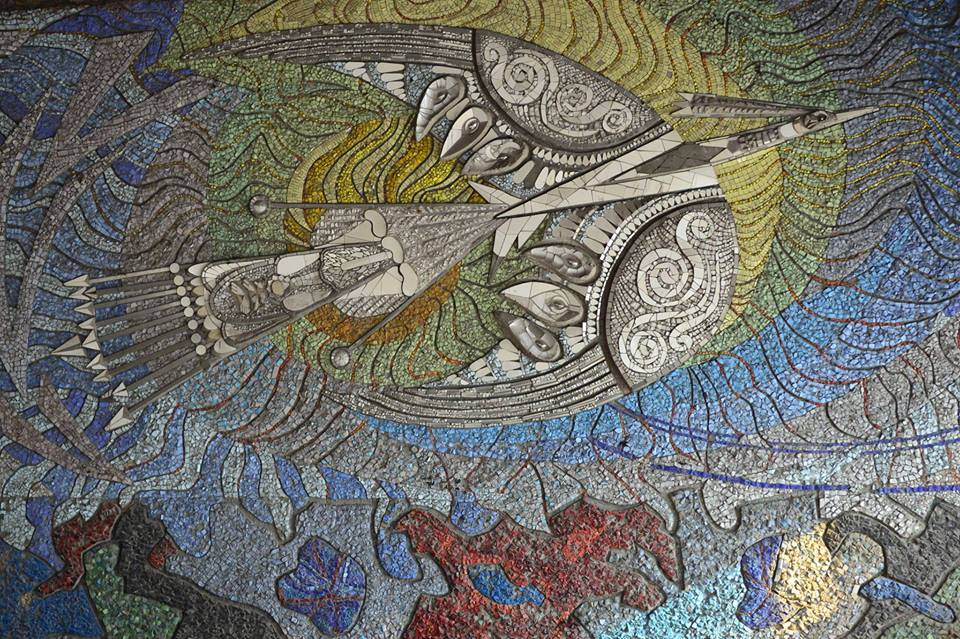
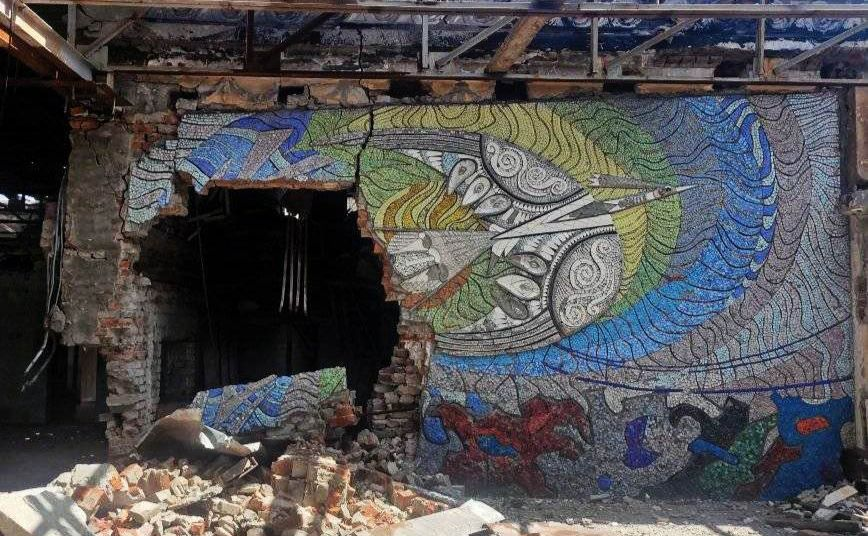
Horska's mosaic Boryviter (Kestrel), created in 1967 in Mariupol, before and after the 2022 Russian invasion of Ukraine

Horska created dozens of works: mosaics, murals, stained glass, etc. She left behind a significant artistic legacy, including a series of portraits of Ukrainian figures from the 1960s, including Svitlychnyi, Symonenko and Sverstiuk, paintings such as Alphabet, Self-Portrait with Son, as well as monumental compositions like Tree of Life in Mariupol (jointly with other authors), Bird-Woman and Prometheus in Donetsk (jointly with other authors), mosaic panel Flag of Victory in the Young Guard museum in Krasnodon (jointly with other authors), and others.

After graduating from the university, she actively participated in the country's artistic life: she exhibited her works at exhibitions (in 1957, at three exhibitions, including the International Exhibition of Fine and Applied Arts as part of the VI World Festival of Youth and Students in Moscow); she also fulfilled orders from the Ministry of Culture of the Ukrainian SSR (in 1957 - the painting My Donbas, in 1959 - a group portrait of the communist labor brigade led by P. Polshchykov).

During the period from 1960 to 1961, she worked in the village of Hornostaipil in Chernobyl Raion, Kyiv Oblast. Horska's son, Oleksiy Zaretskyi, believes that it was during this time that she "fully found her artistic language—not only artistic, but also the emotional component of life." This idea is supported by works such as Collective Farm Woman Portrait, Geese, and Pripyat. Ferry (all 1961). Bold elongated compositions, monumental flat forms, vibrant color schemes (she may have used tempera technique for the first time, which later became her favorite), indicate the emergence of a new phenomenon in Ukrainian art that contradicts official socialist realist standards.

=== Selected works ===
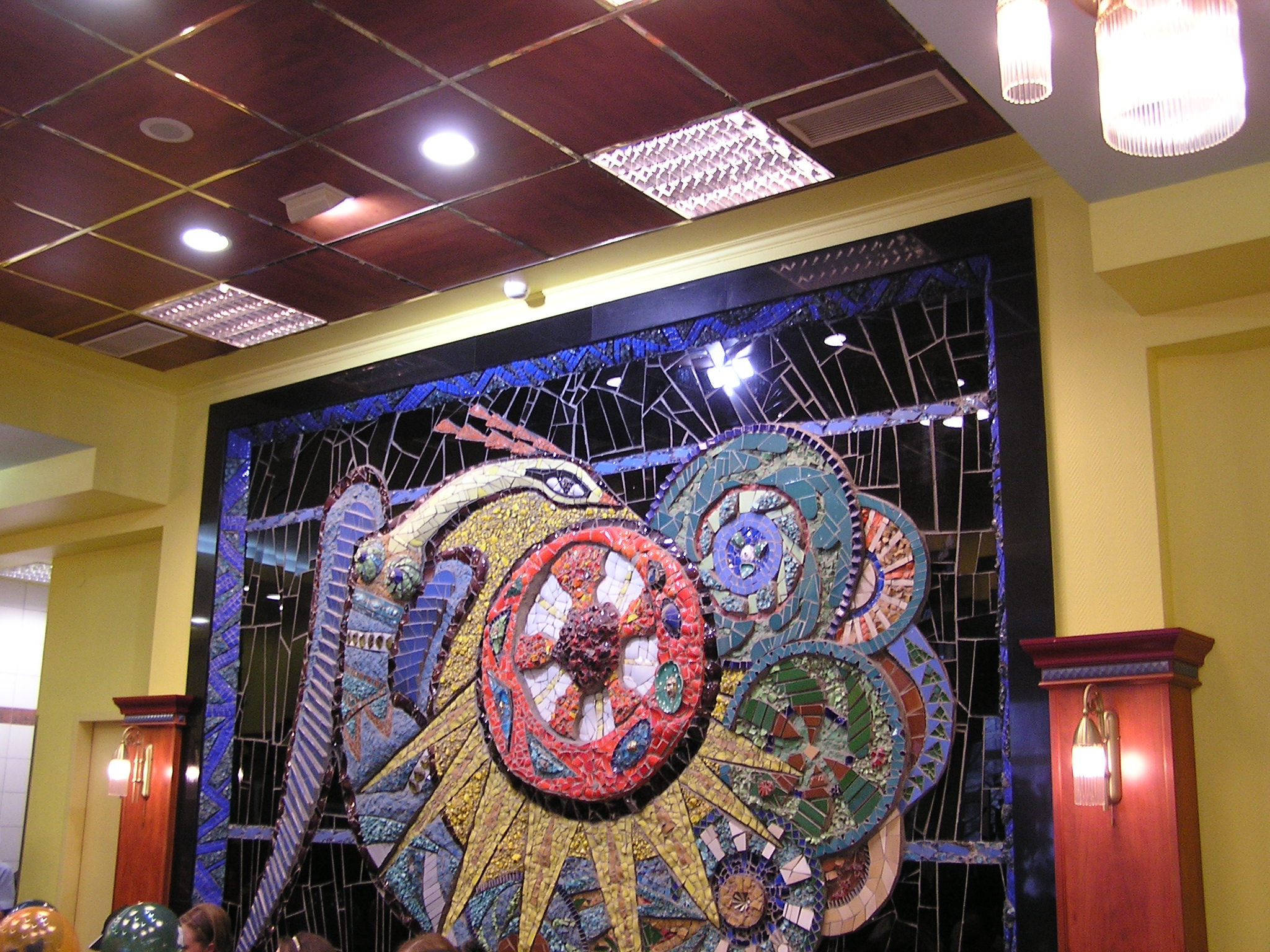
"Bird-woman"

- "Sancommission", diploma painting
- "Self-Portrait", drawing, 1960s
- "Self-Portrait with Son"
- Portrait of miner Vasyl Kryvynets, late 1950s
- "Song about Donbass", 1957
- Portrait of father, 1960
- Painting in memory of deceased mother "Children (Hania, Mykhailo, Petro)"
- "Alphabet", 1962
- "Pripyat. Ferry", 1962–1963
- "Duma" (T. Shevchenko), 1963
- Portrait of Oleksandr Dovzhenko, graphic art, 1960s
- Portrait of theater director Les Taniuk, drawing, early 1960s
- Portrait of B. Antonenko-Davydovych, drawing, early 1960s
- "Sunflower. Portrait of Son", drawing, early 1960s
- "Mother by the stove", early 1960s
- "Mother-Ukraine in chains", early 1960s
- "Say, that the truth will revive", 1963
- Portrait of V. Symonenko, 1963
- Portrait of I. Svitlychny, 1963
- Portrait of Y. Sverstyuk, 1963
- "By the river", decorative composition, 1964
- Composition (male figure in profile), 1963–1964
- "Bird-woman", mosaic, Donetsk, 1966 (preserved)
- "Wind", mosaic, Kyiv, 1967-1968 (preserved in damaged state)

== See also ==
- Soviet dissidents
- Vasyl Stus
- Ivan Svitlychnyi
- Vasyl Symonenko
- Ukrainian underground
