= Sixtiers =

Ukrainian literary generation active in the 1950s and 1960s

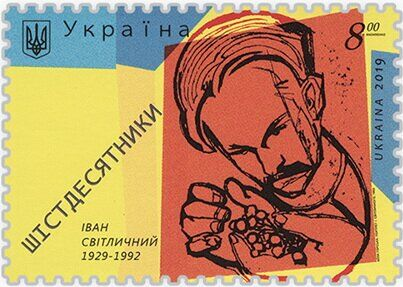
- 2019 stamp of Ukraine featuring Sixtier Ivan Svitlychnyi
- Years active: 1959–1965
- Location: Ukraine
- Major figures: Ivan Drach, Ivan Dziuba, Alla Horska, Lina Kostenko, Borys Oliynyk, Dmytro Pavlychko, Vasyl Stus, Yevhen Sverstiuk, Vasyl Symonenko, Les Tanyuk
- Influences: Anti-Stalinist left, Khrushchev Thaw, Ukrainian nationalism, underground culture (Ukrainian underground)

The Sixtiers (Ukrainian: Шістдесятники, romanized: Shistdesiatnyky, lit. 'people of the sixties') were a generation of young Ukrainians who reawakened Ukrainian literature and a sense of Ukrainian nationalism within the intelligentsia of the Soviet Union. The Sixtiers entered Ukraine's cultural and political life during the late 1950s and 1960s. They expressed elements of humanism, embracing Western literature and drawing on romantic and realist influences, while stressing universal socialism in the values of Leninism.

The Sixtiers arose during the Khrushchev thaw, which followed a period of Russification under Josef Stalin. Born in Ukraine between 1925 and 1945, their worldviews were formed by a series of tragedies and persecutions from their childhood including the Holodomor, Stalin's purges and World War II. Political and historical events followed while many were attending university.

The Sixtiers are often seen as a "group of friends" and included writers, literary critics, poets, painters, fashion designers, and translators. After 1964, many Sixtiers faced persecution and arrest; their work was smuggled out through the samvydav network or hidden until after the dissolution of the Soviet Union.

== Background ==
Much of the Ukrainian intelligentsia had been eliminated by Stalin's purges, and Ukrainian partisan movements during World War II were discredited. A generation of Ukrainian artists were deported or destroyed as the Executed Renaissance. The Soviet Union of the time promoted the idea of a local culture for each member republic, united by a higher Russian culture. This created a sense of inferiority where Ukrainian language and work was downplayed and admission to Kyiv University was reserved for ethnic Russians.

In 1952–53, Soviet officials arrested or expelled many students at the Ukrainian division of the Kyiv University Philological Faculty for demonstrating a "nationalist deviation" in their work. A 1953 Komsomol investigation into the division declared the Ukrainian nationals as "queer fish" (Russian: своеобразные чудаки, romanized: svoeobraznye chudaki) or eccentrics. Ukrainian students at Kyiv University who would become the leaders in the Sixtier movement faced a stigma as Ukrainian peasants while also benefiting from the upward mobility of Soviet education.

Following Stalin's death in 1954, a "thaw" began, spreading across Soviet culture and academia. The Sixtiers emerged from a cultural policy used as an instrument for implementing Soviet discourse, rooted in International socialist realism and the romanticism of nationalism.

Three events would further shape the worldviews of many of the Sixitiers. In Kurenivka, near the center of Kyiv, a dam that the Soviet government had used to dispose of waste from a brick factory burst, causing the 1961 Kurenivka mudslide. An estimated 54 people died, but the KGB suppressed the story for days, and the official account did not match the experience of eyewitnesses. The second event was a fire at the Kyiv State Public Library on 24 May 1964. The third event was the 4 September 1965 Kyiv premiere of the Ukrainian film Shadows of Forgotten Ancestors, where literary critic Ivan Dziuba tried to call out the prosecution of the Ukrainian intelligentsia.

== Etymology ==
Russian literary critic Stanislav Rassadin coined the term sixtier in 1960, in a literary journal, to refer to a new generation of Soviet writers. The term quickly spread among scholars in Ukraine who found themselves part of a national reawakening.

By 1962, the term Sixtier was being used in literary and political science journals, as well as in Western media and academic circles. Artists in Ukraine used the term to self-identify. Following the 1963 death of poet Vasyl Symonenko, Les Tanyuk declared the period of the Sixtiers to be over.

After Ukrainian independence in 1991, a renewed interest grew in the Sixtiers. As a more open account of history emerged, notable figures were added to the list of accepted Sixtiers. Prestige was assigned to those who took intellectual or artistic stances against the communist regime.

== History ==
The 1959 publication of Yurii Lavrynenko's book The Executed Renaissance: Anthology 1917–1933. Poetry - Prose - Drama - Essays in Paris is marked by scholars as the beginning of the Sixtier movement. The book, which had reached Ukraine in the 1960s, was often hand copied and spread as samvydav. Cultural activities of the Sixtiers grew in popularity, including informal literary readings and art exhibitions, vigils in memory of repressed artists and theatre performances. During the brief liberalization of the USSR from 1957 to 1962, the Sixtier movement flourished.

In 1959, The Artistic Youths' Club (KTM) was founded in Kyiv by Tanyuk. He was concerned that formal education in Ukraine looked down on the Ukrainian language and felt that Lenin modified Marxist theories on the nationality question to fit the multinational reality of the Soviet Union. He then wrote to friends to establish a theatre. The club was formed with the Komsomol, the Union of the Communist Youth, which allowed for official recognition and offered a way to avoid censorship. The club coordinated with the Writers' Union and put on plays such as Pathetic Sonata or read works by banished authors such as Todos Osmachka.

In 1960, Tanyuk introduced Vasyl Symonenko to the club. Symonenko studied journalism at Kyiv University from 1952 to 1957. He then served as editor of the literary departments of two regional newspapers, Cherkaska Pravda and Molod Cherkashchyny.

By 1962, the KTM had taken on a more nationalistic fervor. For example, Horska considered herself a Russified Ukrainian and used the KTM members to practice language skills and relearn culture and traditions. The KTM began to sponsor remembrances to those lost in Stalin's purges and field trips to historical Ukrainian sites.

Ivan Dziuba joined KTM in 1962. He had registered with the university and Komsomol as Russian and credited KTM for his "self-Ukrainization". He published a book based on his dissertation, "A Special Person or a Bourgeois". Dziuba joined Symonenko in organizing literary events.

Since the Sixtiers failed to keep within the official ideological and aesthetic boundaries, their cultural activities caused dissatisfaction among the authorities. The end of 1962 marked the start of pressure on the nonconformist intelligentsia. The Sixtiers were not allowed to be published, and were accused of "formalism", "inaction", and "bourgeois nationalism".

Prolisok (English: Snowdrop) was formed in Lviv in 1962 or 1963 by Ihor Kalynets after he attended a poetry reading by Ivan Drach and Dziuba. Both were active in the Club of Creative Youth and encouraged Kalynets. Prolisok, like KTM, was formally created by the regional committee of the Komsomol. The Sixtiers restored the traditions of the classical pre-revolutionary intelligentsia, which aspired to spiritual independence, political alienation, the ideals of civil society, and service to the people.

Soon, word of the literary houses spread. Next to join were a group of artists led by Alla Horska. The artists challenged the state dogma, and Horska's apartment in Kyiv became a second meeting place. The KTM continued to grow, taking on poets, literary critics, and historians.

KTM and Prolisok arranged for an unauthorized choir to sing in Kyiv Central Park on 31 August 1963. In December, Symonenko died of cancer while in Soviet custody and many accused the Soviet State of denying Symonenko lifesaving care. KTM organized "Literaturna Ukraïna" to commemorate Symonenko's life. KTM was forced to close in 1964.

In 1964, Alla Horska, together with Opanas Zalyvakha, Liudmyla Semykina, Halyna Sevruk, and Halyna Zubchenko, created the stained glass "Shevchenko. Mother" in the vestibule of the main building of Kyiv University. It depicted a poet with a woman leaning against him, "symbolizing Mother Ukraine". The university administration, acting with the tacit consent of the party leadership, ordered the destruction of "ideologically divergent" stained glass windows for not complying with approved aesthetic values. After this incident, a commission classified the stained glass as ideologically hostile and deeply incompatible with the principles of socialist realism. Horska and Semykina were expelled from the Artists' Union for a year.

The 1964 State Public Library fire in Kyiv lasted two days and resulted in the destruction of hundreds of thousands of books and manuscripts on Ukrainian history. This had a massive impact on the young intellectuals. Sverstiuk wrote the essay "On the Occasion of Pohruzhalsky's Trial", which raised suspicions that the fire was intended to further erase Ukrainian history.

The ideas of the Sixtiers began to spread in samvydav and the Writers' Union continued to host events. In January 1965, the Writers' Union posthumously nominated Symonenko for the Shevchenko Prize, the highest Ukrainian literary award. Symonenko's diaries were published abroad, triggering a crackdown by the KGB. As many as 200 Sixtiers were arrested in a 1965–1966 purge. Hoska's apartment came under KGB surveillance. In April 1965, Radianska Ukraïna published a forged letter credited to Symonenko's mother, which accused other Sixtiers of betraying him. On 4 September 1965, during the premiere of Shadows of Forgotten Ancestors in Kyiv's Ukraïna cinema, three Sixtiers (Dziuba, Chornovil and Vasyl Stus) spoke to protest against the arrests of Ukrainian intelligentsia. Many faced repression, and Stuswas was dismissed from his job at the State Historical Archive.

Faced with fierce resistance from the party apparatus, some of the Sixtiers compromised with the authorities. In contrast, others became political dissidents, members of the human rights movement, and openly opposed the regime. Ivan Dziuba published Internationalism or Russification? In 1967, Chornovil collected tales of the arrested Sixtiers which he published as Woe from Wit.

Following perestroika, the Sixtiers started to gather again. In 1989, Ivan Drach, Viacheslav Chornovil, and Mykhailo Horyn founded Popular Movement of Ukraine (Rukh). Following Ukrainian independence in 1991, many Sixtiers served in Ukrainian politics and the art scene.

== Academic and artistic impact ==
The rise of the Ukrainian language, culture, and history at Kyiv University encouraged students to think about the national question. The Sixtiers were distinguished by their liberal and anti-totalitarian views, and also by romanticism, which found vivid expressions in music and visual arts. The Sixtiers believed in communist ideals, and had come to be strongly disappointed with Stalin's regime and its repression of basic civil liberties.

The movement had a goal of reviving national identity within a spirit of Soviet socialism that rejected Russian chauvinism. Stylistically, the Sixtiers are noted more for their formalism, drawing on Soviet doctrine of social realism. Many of the projects completed by Sixtiers, both literary and artistic, were the result of state-funded commissions. Marxist aesthetics felt art should be politicized to transmit socialist messages. Russia also had a long tradition of social critique through realist painting, such as the Society for Itinerant Art Exhibitions, commonly known as Peredvizhniki. Through this ambiguous relationship with the state and the traditions of realism, the Sixtiers carved out a movement that evolved from a reawakening of Ukrainian nationalism to a dissident movement.

The artistic and academic impact of the Sixtiers first underwent a renewal of nationalism. At KDU, a literary studio called "SICh" (Chumak Studio) had a double meaning as a reference to the Zaporizhzhian Cossack State. This allowed literary critics, artists, and scientists to meet in a forum to discuss Ukrainian culture. They argued that a return to Leninist norms from Stalinist ones would address the "nationality" question without resorting to Russian chauvinism. Thus, the rising nationalism within the movement was not so much anti-Soviet as many embraced the idea of international socialism, returning to Lenin's roots. This form of dissident socialism allowed for the awakening of a national identity while meeting strict standards.

Over time, the movement began to take on more dissident tones in response to growing tensions over public performances of their work. The Sixtiers worked within the constraints and through the Komsomol apparatus in a relationship where the Komsomol acted as both a controlling and an enabling agent. Together with the Writers' Union, the Komsomol provided venues for exhibits and meetings. The Sixtiers were neither separate from nor in total opposition to the larger Soviet Ukrainian culture, but also tapped into a world of nonconformist culture that emerged globally, such as the Beatniks in the 1950s and the Hippies in the 1960s.

The impact of the Sixtiers on art and literacy is often viewed through the lens of diaspora scholars in North America. Since the dissolution of the Soviet Union, it has been possible to re-examine the period from Ukrainian and Eastern European perspectives. Some critics find poetry and paintings of the Sixtiers created a double emancipation by returning to formalism to protect Ukrainian heritage while working within the approved doctrine of social realism.

In art, the Sixtiers brought a period of romanticism, celebrating Ukrainian peasant life, traditional fashion, and cultural symbols such as pysanka eggs. These elements brought in a period of social-realist canon that celebrated the social ideal. The artist would often balance the double meaning of undisclosed political protest through commissions of state projects.

Among the Sixtiers, a group of literary critics remained committed to translating Western titles into Ukrainian. They had a subversive goal of bringing the West's ideas, imagery, and cultural trends with them.

== Notable Sixtiers ==
National ideas dominated the Ukrainian Sixtiers movement. Many Ukrainian Sixtiers defended the national language and culture, and freedom of artistic creativity. The Sixtiers consisted of writers, painters, textile designers, film directors, and translators.

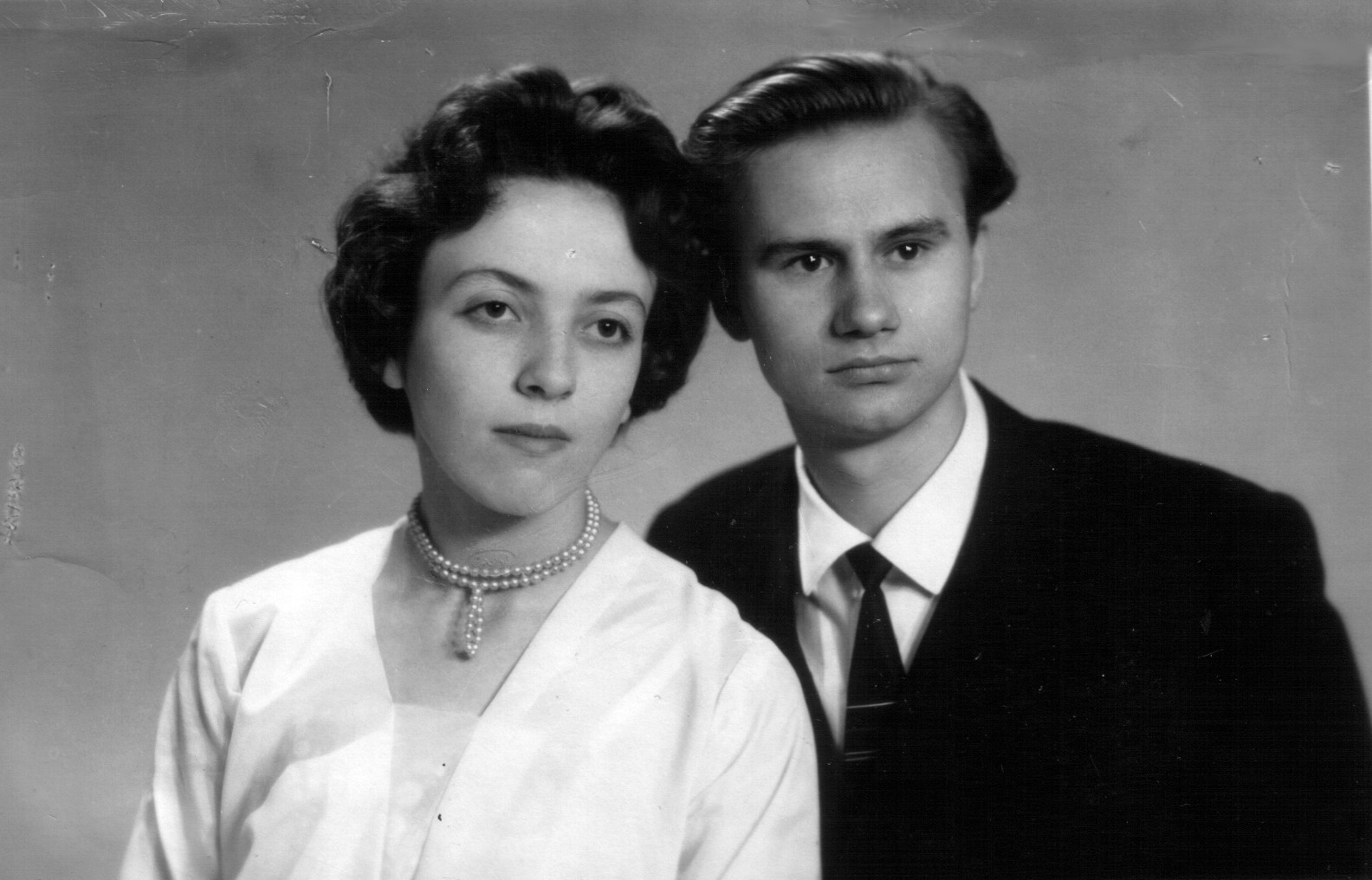
Iryna and Ihor Kalynets, 1961

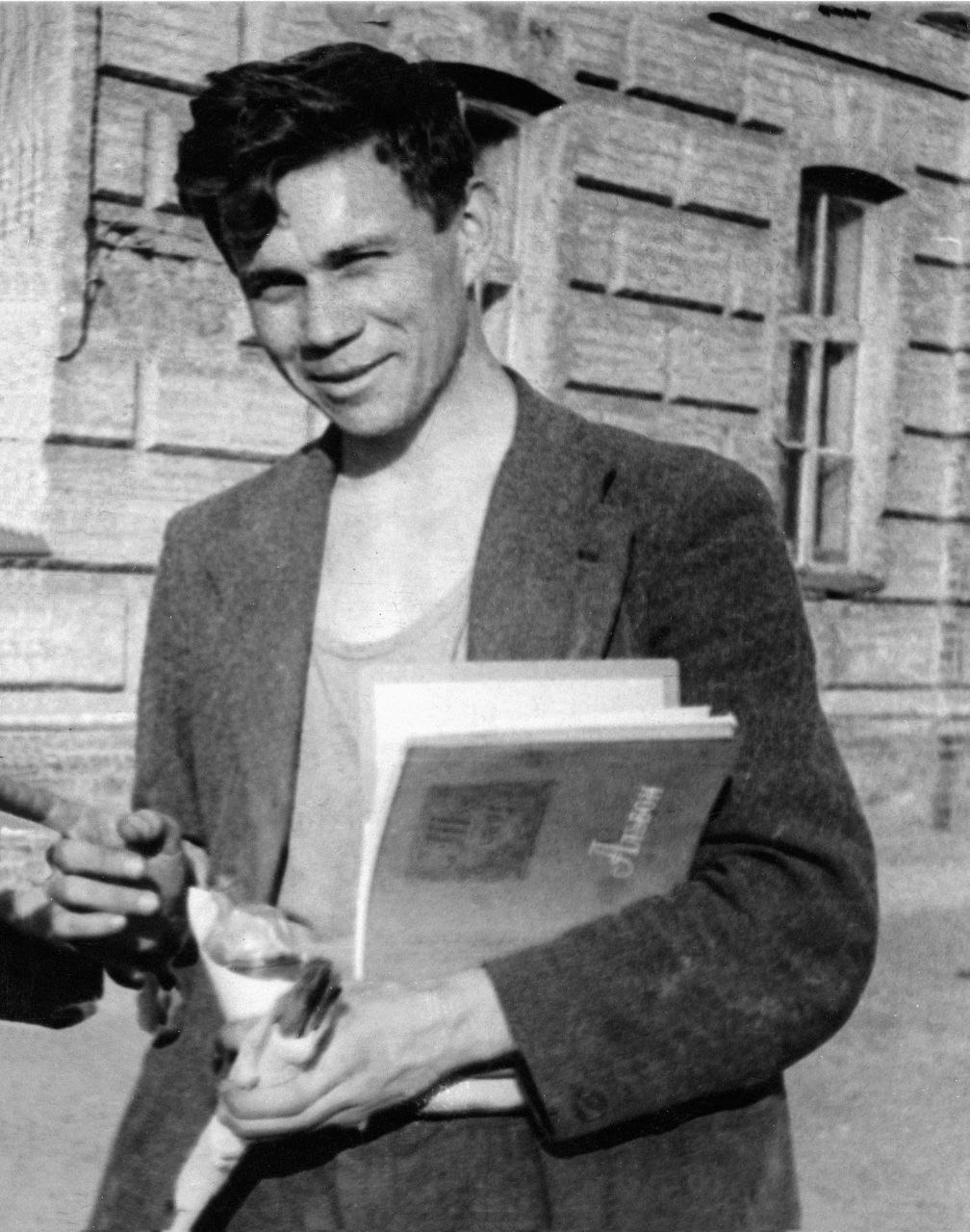
Viktor Zaretsky

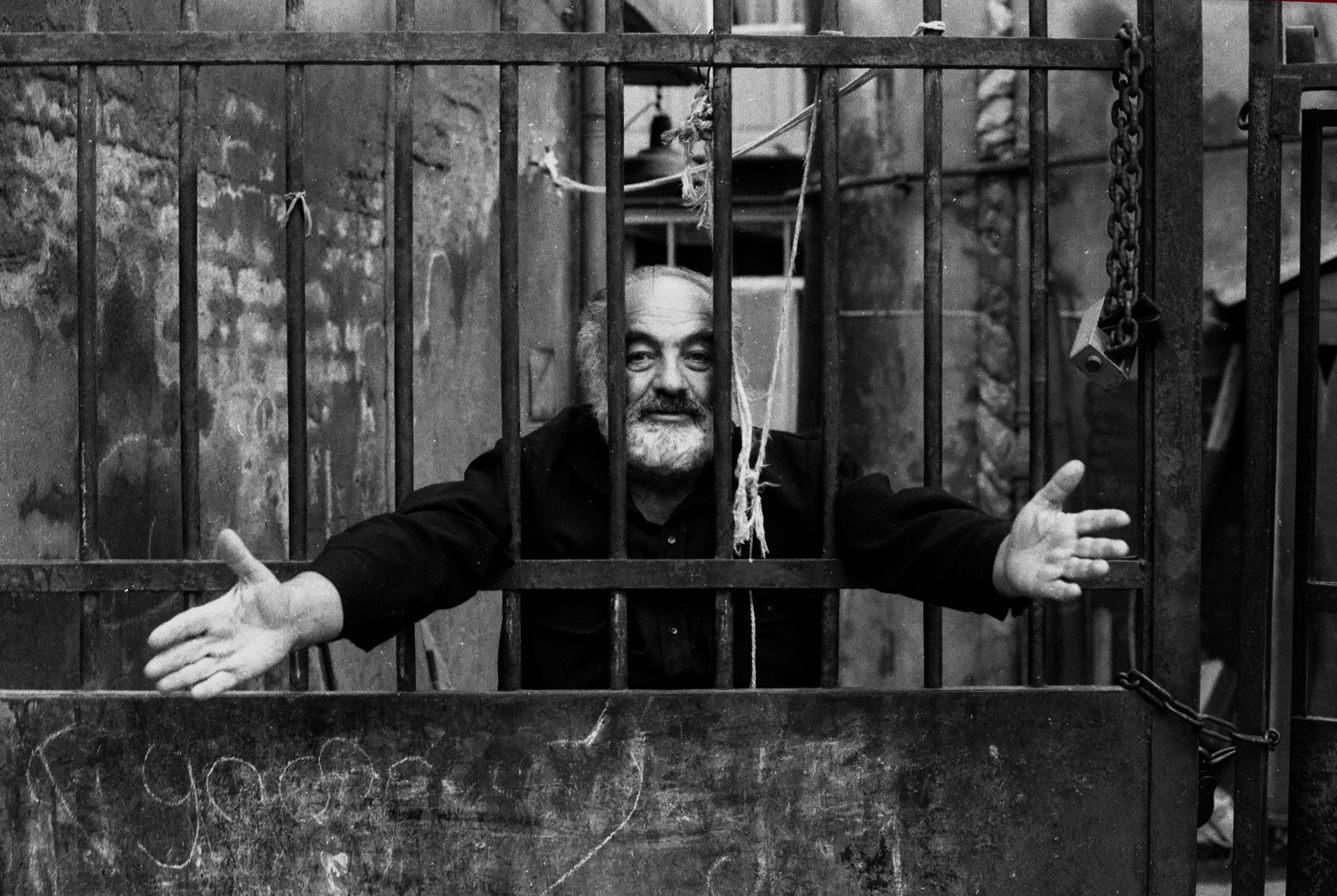
Sergei Parajanov

Authors:

- Ihor and Iryna Kalynets
- Ivan Drach
- Valeriy Shevchuk
- Mykola Vinhranovsky
- Volodymyr Drozd
- Hryhir Tiutiunnyk
- Borys Oliynyk
- Vasyl Stus
- Dmytro Pavlychko
- Vasyl Symonenko
- Mykola Kholodny
- Lina Kostenko
- Yevhen Hutsalo
- Boris Chichibabin

Painters and textile artists:

- Alla Horska
- Viktor Zaretsky
- Lyubov Panchenko

Literary and art critics:

- Ivan Dziuba
- Ivan Svitlychnyi
- Yevhen Sverstyuk
- Vitalii Donchyk
- Roman Korogodsky
- Yurii Smyrny.

Theater and film directors:

- Les Tanyuk
- Sergei Parajanov
- Yuri Ilyenko

Translators:

- Hryhorii Kochur
- Mykola Lukash
- Mykhailyna Kotsiubynska

Journalists:

- Viacheslav Chornovil

== Criticism ==
An examination of an art movement or generation within Ukraine presents historical challenges, because such relies on fragmentary materials published in memoirs, diaries, and interviews, with other materials lost during persecutions. This research is conducted in a period of Ukrainian independence, which has led some critics to suggest the literary work of the Sixtiers becomes conflated with current efforts to build a national mythology, thus receiving undue idolization.

The Sixtiers were given a special place in the canon, creating a national identity that some poets later found unwarranted. This was especially noted among younger generations associated with the literary journal Mala Ukrains'ka Entsyklopediia Al'ternatyvnoi Literatury (MUEAL). Edited by Volodymyr Ieshkiliev and Iurii Andrukhovych, the journal was associated with the Bu-Ba-Bu group and became part of the "new canon" in the 1980s and 1990s, which rejected canons and parodied the Writers' Union and other institutions of official culture.

Serhiy Zhadan, who considers Andrukhovych and the Bu-Ba-Bu group major influences, often writes of rejecting poetry as a tool for national identity formation and questions the canonization of poets. His poem "The Sell-Out Poets of the '60s" in History of Culture at the Turn of This Century details a narrative stance that questions the loyalty of the Sixtiers.

== See also ==
- Ukrainian Underground
- Executed Renaissance
- Creative Youth Club
