= Chichibabin =

Chichibabin (Russian: Чичибабин) is a Russian surname. Notable people with the surname include:

- Aleksei Chichibabin (1871–1945), Soviet/Russian organic chemist
- Boris Chichibabin (1923–1994), Soviet poet
