= Zubchenko =

Zubchenko (Ukrainian: Зубченко) is a Ukrainian surname. Notable people with the surname include:

- Halyna Zubchenko (1929–2000), Ukrainian painter
- Vita Zubchenko (born 1989), Ukrainian rhythmic gymnast
