= 60s generation =

The 1960s generation, 60s generation, generation of '60s, Sixties' generation, etc. may refer to the following generations associated with the decade of 1960s:

== Culture ==
- Counterculture of the 1960s, an anti-establishment culture in the Western world
  - Flower power generation of the 1960s
  - The sexual revolution of the 1960s, also called the "Love Generation"

== Groups of people ==
- Baby boomers, who had a major impact on the culture of the 1960s
- Generation X, whose birth years begin around the early-mid 1960s
- Sixtiers, а new generation of young intellectuals who reawakened literature and Ukrainian nationalism (then part of the Soviet Union)

== See also ==
- New Left, a broad political movement that emerged from the counterculture of the 1960s and continued through the 1970s
- New Wave (science fiction), a style of science fiction literature of the 1960s and 1970s
