= Vasyl Stus Prize =

- Awarded for: ...awarded authors, who have outstanding achievements in their field, take a clear public position, actively present in the Ukrainian cultural space
- Country: Ukrainian SSR / Ukraine
- First award: 1989

The Vasyl Stus Prize (Ukrainian: Премія імені Василя Стуса), given since January 1989, is the first non-governmental prize awarded for "talent and courage" and being worthy of the memory of Vasyl Stus. The prize was set up by the Ukrainian Association of the Independent Creative Intelligentsia and awarded every year on the poet Stus's date of birth, in Lviv. In 1990 it moved to Kyiv. The awarding of the prize is currently organized by Pen Centre Ukraine, Kyiv Mohyla Business School and Dukh i Litera publishing house.

== Winners ==
- Andriy Antoniuk (1993)
- Serhii Bukovskyi (2023)
- Olha Bohomolets (1992)
- Kyrylo Bulkin (2010)
- Maria Burmaka (1991)
- Stanislav Chernilevskyi (2006)
- Andriy Danylchenko (2010)
- Borys Dovhan (1990)
- Sofiia Fedyna (2013)
- Moysey Fishbein (2000)
- Valeriy Franchuk (2003)
- Borys Gudziak (2018)
- Olena Holub (2006)
- Anna-Halya Horbach (1993)
- Mykola Horbal (1992)
- Volodymyr Huba (2000)
- Hryhoriy Huseynov (2005)
- Ihor Kalynets (1992)
- Taras Kompanichenko (2004)
- Mykhailyna Kotsiubynska (1994)
- Oleksandra Koval (2016)
- Olha Kravchuk (1999)
- Ivanna Krypyakevych (2004)
- Andriy Kryshtalskyi (2005)
- Volodymyr Kuchynsky (1989)
- Yevheniya Leshchuk (2006)
- Raisa Lysha (1990)
- Antonina Lystopad (1993)
- Ruslana Lyzhychko (2014)
- Mykola Malyshko (1998)
- Myroslav Marynovych (2009)
- Larysa Masenko (2010)
- Valentyna Masterova (2002)
- Oleksandra Matviichuk (2007)
- Olha Melnyk (2008)
- Andriy Mentukh (1993)
- Liubov Minenko (2013)
- Halyna Mohylnytska (2008)
- Mykhailo Moskalenko (2003)
- Kost Moskalets (2004)
- Serhiy Moroz (1996)
- Yaroslava Muzychenko (2011)
- Mariya Ovdiyenko (2011)
- Vasyl Ovsienko (2000)
- Lyubov Panchenko (2001)
- Anatol Perepadia (2002)
- Lana Perlulainen (1998)
- Mykola Plakhotniuk (2013)
- Oleksandr Polozhynskyi (2014)
- Vitaly Portnikov (2022)
- Tetiana Pylypchuk (2024)
- Oleksandr Riabokrys (2010)
- Anatoliy Rusnachenko (2003)
- Sad (band) (2011)
- Akhtem Seitablayev (2020)
- Stepan Semeniuk (2010)
- Liudmyla Semykina (2000)
- Halyna Sevruk (1991)
- Vasyl Slapchuk (1999)
- Oleksandr Smyk (2008)
- Timothy Snyder (2025)
- Eleonora Solovey (2007)
- Ivan Svitlichny (1989)
- Nadiya Svitlychna (1992)
- Galyna Stefanova (2001)
- The Telnyuk Sisters (1998)
- Borys Tkachenko (2013)
- Mykhailo Tkachuk (2007)
- Vlad Troitsky (2019)
- Sviatoslav Vakarchuk (2014)
- Volodymyr Viatrovych (2012)
- Taras Voznyak (2021)
- Opanas Zalyvakha (1989)
- Yevgen Zakharov (2012)
- Serhiy Zhadan (2017)
- Iryna Zhylenko (2012)
- Ihor Zhuk (1997)
- Osyp Zinkevych (2009)

== See also ==
- Kobzar Literary Award
- List of literary awards
- List of poetry awards
- List of European art awards
- Shevchenko National Prize
- Warrior of Light
