= Oleksandr Riabokrys =

Ukrainian documentary director

- Born: June 1, 1952 (age 73); Krasnoarmiisk, Ukraine
- Occupation: Director

Oleksandr Mykhailovych Riabokrys (Ukrainian: Олександр Михайлович Рябокрис) (born June 1, 1952) is a current director of the documentary film department of the National Television Company of Ukraine, and laureate of the Vasyl Stus Prize.

== Biography ==
Born in 1952 in the mining city of Krasnoarmiysk into a surveying and bookkeeping family, he graduated from the Donetsk Polytechnic institute as an engineer of Industrial control systems, and from Saint Petersburg State University of Cinema and television as a director.

== Films ==
The first of his works was a film about the haidamaka-movement. Among another films are:

- Sandarmokh
- Ukrainians from Kolyma
- academic Mykhailo Kravchuk Calvary
- Man of Will (about Mykhailo Soroka)
- The Miroslav Simchich war
- Free Cossacks (the liberation movement in 1918-1922 in Kholodny Yar)
- Sergei Korolev"
- Opening Sky (the development of aviation in Ukraine )
- The Great Game (about the Ukrainian scouts organisation, Plast)
