= Sofiia Fedyna =

Ukrainian politician

- Софія Федина
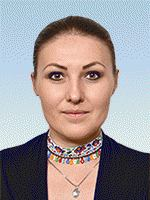

People's Deputy of Ukraine
- Incumbent
- Assumed office 29 April 2019
- Constituency: European Solidarity, No. 5

Personal details
- Born: 18 February 1984 (age 42) Lviv, Ukrainian SSR, Soviet Union (now Ukraine)
- Party: European Solidarity
- Education: University of Lviv

Sofiia Romanivna Fedyna (Ukrainian: Софія Романівна Федина; born 18 February 1984) is a Ukrainian politician, singer and television presenter currently serving as a People's Deputy of Ukraine from the party list of European Solidarity since 2019.

== Early life and career ==
Sofiia Fedyna was born in Lviv on 18 February 1984. From 1990 to 2000, she studied at Secondary School No. 53 with in-depth study of the English language, and graduated with honors. From 2001 to 2005, she was part of the membership in the Youth Public Organization "Young Diplomacy".

Between 2002 and 2005, she held the position of deputy head of the Lviv regional representative office of the European Youth Parliament, an international youth public organization. As a delegate from that organization, she participated in the meetings of the United World Youth Council in Oxford. From July to August 2004, she studied at the International Summer School of the University of Vienna, and graduated with honors.

Between 2005 and 2008, Fedyna was a postgraduate student at the University of Lviv. On 21 May 2010, she defended her thesis on "Concepts of peace in international relations and their implementation" and received the title of Candidate of Political Sciences. Her field of scientific interests were research on peace, settlement of international conflicts, mechanisms of establishing and maintaining peace.

Since 2006, she has been part of the membership of the International Association of Young Political Scientists (IAPSS). From February to December 2008, she studied on a scholarship program of the Polish government at the Center for East European Studies of the University of Warsaw. She defended her thesis on the topic: "Historical memory as a state policy: on the example of the problem of reconciliation of OUN-UPA veterans and Soviet veterans."

From February to October 2010, she was the author and host of the political-analytical program "View from the High Castle", from the Lviv Regional State Broadcasting Company.

She won the Vasyl Stus Prize in 2013.

== Political career ==
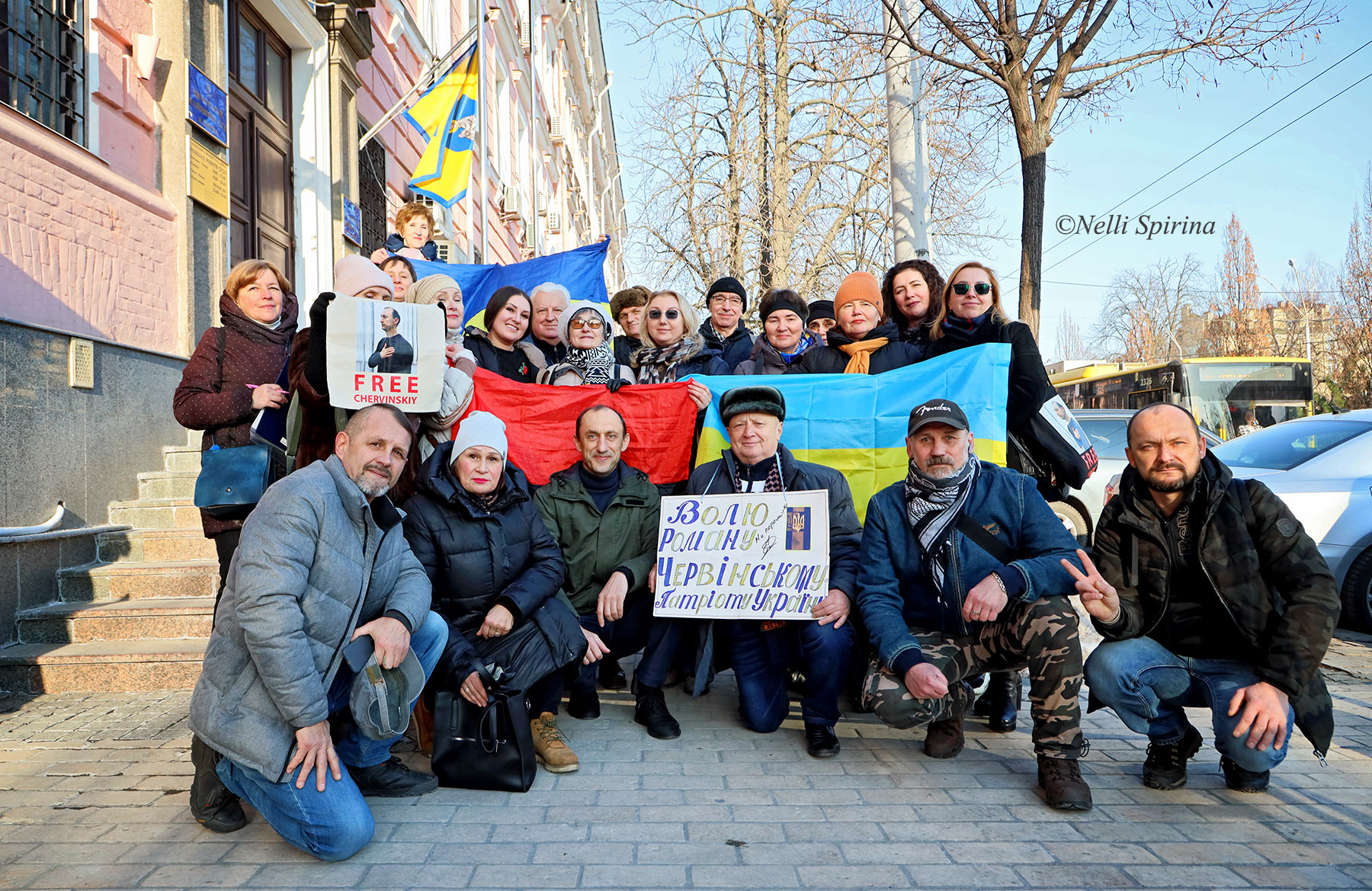
Sofia Fedyna (standing) as part of the support group of Ukrainian counterintelligence officer Roman Chervinsky (sitting in the center) near the Pecherskyi Court in Kyiv on February 25, 2025

During Euromaidan, Fedyna, together with Yuriy Shivala, vocalist of the group I Want MORE, were the leaders of Euromaidan in Lviv.

She won the prize of the Cabinet of Ministers of Ukraine for special achievements of youth in the development of Ukraine in 2017.

Fedyna is a member of the Verkhovna Rada Committee on Humanitarian and Information Policy.

=== Investigation ===
On 26 October 2019, Fedyna, together with military officer Maruseya Zvirobiy, recorded a video appeal to Volodymyr Zelenskyy in one of the Lviv cafes, which was considered by the authorities as a threat to the president's life. Subsequently, Fedyna stated that after applying, she began to receive threats, after which she submitted a statement to the GPU and the Ministry of Internal Affairs. On 6 February 2020, Fedyna was summoned to the State Criminal Investigation Department in order to hand over suspicion of a criminal case against her. Oleksandr Kachura, a deputy from the Servant of the People faction, wrote a statement regarding Fedyna's and Zvirobiy's actions.

During the investigation, Fedyna was informed of the suspicion of "threats against Zelenskyy", and was threatened with up to 5 years in prison. On 10 March, the Pechersk Court of Kyiv chose a personal bond for Fedyna as a preventive measure in the case of possible threats. On 12 May, the SBI concluded the investigation, extending Fedyna's pretrial detention.

== Personal life ==
Fedyna is a member of the Presidium of the World Federation of Ukrainian Lemko Associations, and an international political scientist. She is a candidate of political sciences.
