= Lyubov Panchenko =

Ukrainian artist and fashion designer (1938–2022)

- Любов Панченко
- Born: 2 February 1938; Yablunka, Ukrainian SSR, USSR (now part of Bucha, Kyiv Oblast, Ukraine)
- Died: 30 April 2022 (aged 84); Kyiv, Ukraine
- Education: Ukrainian Academy of Printing
- Known for: Fashion design, watercolour painting, embroidery, fabric collages, linocut
- Movement: Sixtiers
- Awards: Vasyl Stus Prize

Lyubov Mykhailivna Panchenko (Ukrainian: Любов Михайлівна Панченко; 2 February 1938 – 30 April 2022) was a Ukrainian visual artist and fashion designer. She was a member of the Ukrainian Women's Union. She belonged to the Sixtiers, a group of artists of the sixties who revived Ukrainian culture during the Khrushchev Thaw.

== Biography ==
=== Education and artistic career ===
Lyubov Mykhailivna Panchenko was born on 2 February 1938 in the village of Yablunka, which is now a suburb of Bucha, Ukraine. In the late 1950s she graduated from the embroidery department of the Kyiv School of Applied Arts. Later, she worked in a tailoring workshop and at the same time expanded her horizons of knowledge of art, becoming interested in linocut. In 1968 she entered the Faculty of Graphics of the Ukrainian Academy of Printing. In the 1960s she joined the Club of Creative Youth and became a member of its literary section, Brama.

Panchenko worked at the Design and Engineering Technological Institute as a fashion designer and at the Republican House of Models. At that time, her bright talent flourished: she created a series of watercolours, clothing models, embroidery patterns, graphic screensavers for books, and paintings. Many of her embroidery works were showcased in Soviet Woman.

Panchenko defended the Ukrainian language and culture. She wrote pysanky (Ukrainian Easter eggs), embroidered Ukrainian national costumes for choirs, and raised money to help political prisoners serving sentences for "anti-Soviet agitation and propaganda". With her participation, the tradition of koliada (caroling) and the vertep nativity plays was revived in Kyiv.

Panchenko was awarded the Vasyl Stus Prize in 2001. Because of the evident Ukrainian folk inspirations in her work, she never had an exhibition during the Soviet era. She relied financially on her fashion work and embroidery.

=== Death ===
During the Battle of Bucha, which occurred early on during the Russian invasion of Ukraine, Panchenko was forced to remain inside her house for a month without food. After Russian troops left the city, she was taken to a hospital in Kyiv, where for nearly a month doctors tried to save her life. She never recovered and died there on 30 April 2022, at the age of 84.

== Exhibited works ==
In 2008, the National Museum of Literature of Ukraine exhibited the anniversary exhibition of Lyubov Panchenko. Yevhen Sverstiuk, a human rights activist and poet at the time, remarked: “These works clearly bear the stamp of genius. She lives in her world, she opens this world to us."

In 2014, the National Museum of Literature of Ukraine mounted the exhibition "My World!" («Світе мій!»).

Panchenko's works are exhibited in private collections and in the Museum of the Sixties in Kyiv.

== Literature ==
- Любов Панченко: повернення: альбом / передм. Олена Лодзинська, Василь Перевальський, Діана Клочко; упорядн. Олена Лодзинська, Любов Крупник; переклад на англ. Ольга Грабар, Соломія Джаман, Олексій Плохотюк; дизайн Олексій Чекаль. — Київ-Харків: Видавець Олександр Савчук, 2021. — 256 с., 270 іл. — ~~ISBN 978-617-7538-74-4.~~
