= Halyna Sevruk =

Ukrainian artist (1929–2022)

- Sevruk in 1970
- Born: Halyna Sylvestrivna Sevruk; May 18, 1929; Samarkand, Uzbek SSR, Soviet Union
- Died: February 13, 2022 (aged 92); Kyiv, Ukraine
- Known for: Ceramics and mosaics
- Movement: Sixtiers
- Relatives: Ivan Hryhorovych-Barskyi

Halyna Sylvestrivna Sevruk (Ukrainian: Галина Сильвестрівна Севрук, pronounced [ɦɐˈlɪnɐ sɪlʲˈwɛst⁽ʲ⁾r⁽ʲ⁾iu̯nɐ seu̯ˈruk]; 18 May 1929 – 13 February 2022) was a Ukrainian artist who was particularly notable for her ceramics and mosaics. Her art often incorporated themes related to Ukrainian history and culture. She was a member of the Ukrainian Sixtiers, a dissident movement of intellectuals within the Soviet Union in the 1960s.

== Early years ==
Sevruk was born on 18 May 1929 in Samarkand, Uzbekistan. As a result of forced emigration, her parents had been in Samarkand starting in 1920. Her father, Sylvestr Martynovych Sevruk, was an architect, and came from a Polish family. Her mother Iryna Dmytrivna (née Hryhorovych-Barska) was Ukrainian, and was related to the noted architect Ivan Hryhorovych-Barskyi. The year after Halyna Sevruk's birth, the family moved to Kharkiv, the largest city in the northeast region of Ukraine. They moved again in 1944, settling in the city of Kyiv.

== Career ==
Sevruk began her artistic training by studying painting with the artist Hryhorii Svitlytskyi. She later recalled these years fondly, and noted that the experience shaped her commitment to being a "true artist".

From 1947 to 1949, Sevruk attended the Shevchenko Art School, located in Kyiv, where she studied with Yurii Kyianchenko. In 1952, she began attending the Kyiv State Art Institute, graduating in 1959. She later observed that the instruction she received from the faculty at the Art Institute, which included renowned artists like Viktor Puzyrkov, did not match her personal artistic aspirations.

In the 1960s, she worked as a decorator of buildings for the Art Fund. She developed a sense for incorporating elements of Ukrainian art, history, language and literature into her art. She joined the Club of Creative Youth in Kyiv, founded by Les Tanyuk, where she found like-minded artists who supported her ideas. In 1963, she completed "The Forest Song", the first of several mosaic pieces she would make. Another mosaic, entitled "Lily", was exhibited in 1964. In the same year, she also took up ceramics, a pursuit that would produce some of her better-known works. She created monumental ceramic artwork for installation in institutions, such as the Chorne More Hotel in Odesa, and the Khmilnyk Sanatorium.

Sevruk started illustrating in ink, beginning in the late 1960s. Her illustrations appeared in several books of poetry, including a translated book of poetry by Federico Garcia Lorca. In 1968, she signed the Letter of 139, a letter from intellectuals opposing the reversal of the policies of destalinization and the persecution of some fellow artists. In response, she was expelled from the Union of Artists of Ukraine. Two fellow artists, Alla Horska and Liuda Semykina, were also expelled. Nine other artists who had signed the letter later "confessed" and thus avoided punishment. Sevruk's studio was closed, and for many years, she was prevented from exhibiting; her works were not welcomed into museums, galleries or exhibition halls. Sevruk was reinstated to the Union over 20 years later, in 1989.

In the 1970s Sevruk experimented with different materials in her ceramics and continued to draw inspiration from folk elements and fairytales. She produced a number of paintings with a new artistic manner, many of which were tributes to people in her social circles. In 1970, she created a monumental stele from reinforced concrete titled "The Tree of Life". This was destroyed as it did not comply with the official aesthetic standards. In 1984, after years of being unable to exhibit because of her political views, Sevruk held her first solo exhibition. The show was held at the Hryhorii Svitlytskyi Memorial House-Museum, at the home of her old teacher in Kyiv. In 1987, she had a second solo exhibition at the Museum of Podil.

== Personal life and death ==
Sevruk died on 13 February 2022, at the age of 92.

== Awards and recognition ==
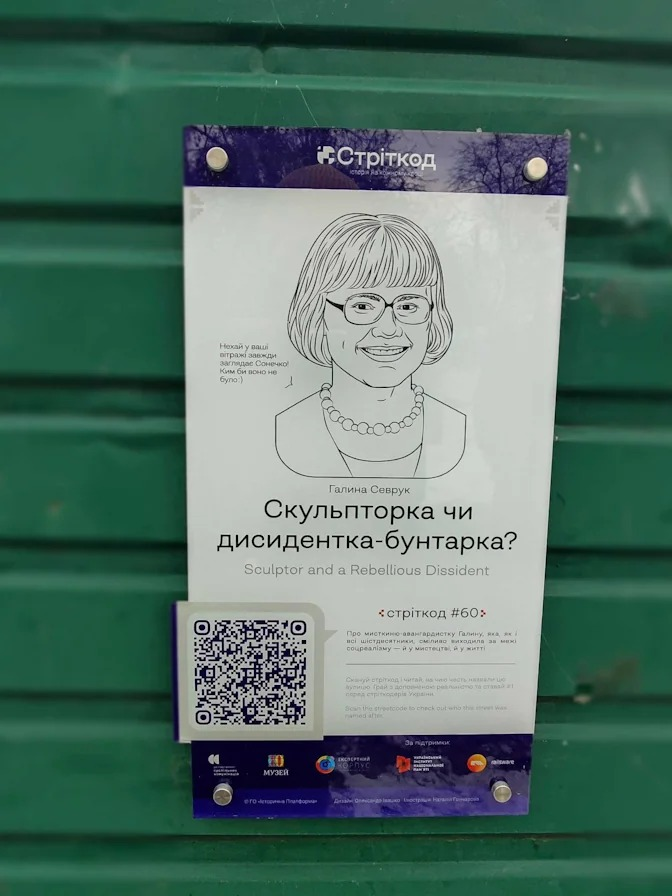
The Streetcode for Halyna Sevruk on the street named after her in Kyiv. Project: "Streetcode: History at Every Turn" by NGO "History Platform"

She was awarded the Andrey Sheptytsky Art Prize in 1994. The award is named in honor of a former Metropolitan of the Greek Catholic Church who was an art aficionado.

She received the Vasyl Stus Prize in 1991 and was awarded the title of Merited Artist of Ukraine in 2005.

Her art is on display at the Sixtier Museum in Kyiv.

On March 23, 2023, Marshalska Street in the Holosiivskyi District of Kyiv was renamed Halyna Sevruk Street. Subsequently, a Streetcode commemorative plaque was installed there by the NGO "History Platform" as part of the "Streetcode: History at Every Turn" project.
