= Viktor Zaretsky =

Ukrainian painter and muralist

Shevchenko National Prize laureate Viktor Zaretsky
- Віктор Зарецький
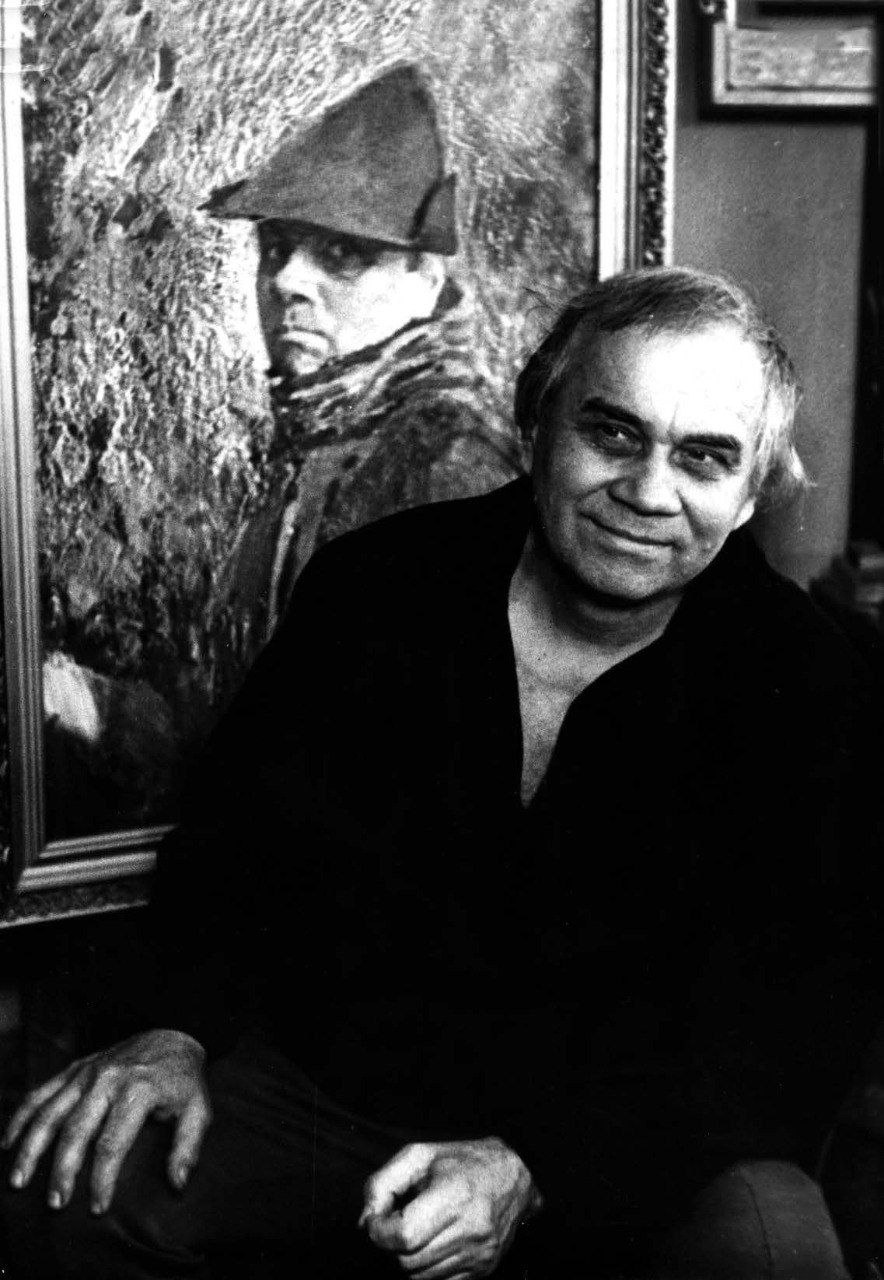
- Born: 8 February 1925; Bilopillia, Sumy Oblast, Ukrainian SSR, Soviet Union
- Died: 23 August 1990 (aged 65); Kyiv, Kyiv Oblast, Ukrainian SSR, Soviet Union
- Resting place: Berkovtsi cemetery
- Citizenship: Soviet Union
- Education: Kyiv Art Institute
- Known for: Ukrainian monument art, paintings
- Movement: Dissident movement in the Soviet Union
- Spouse: Alla Horska

Viktor Zaretsky (Ukrainian: Віктор Зарецький; 8 February 1925 – 23 August 1990) was a Ukrainian painter and artist.

== Personal life and education ==
Viktor Zaretsky was born on the 8th of February 1925 in Bilopillia, Sumy Oblast, Ukrainian SSR. As a child, he and his family moved frequently. In 1943, Zaretsky was drafted into the army, where he served in the 359 Regiment of the 14th Cheboksary Reserve Rifle Division. He was demobilized in 1945 with the conclusion of the Second World War. In 1947, Zaretsky began attending the Kyiv Art Institute. He married his wife and fellow artist Alla Horska in 1953. He graduated in 1953. Following his graduation, Zaretsky stayed at the Kyiv Art Institute to teach. Zaretsky became a member of the National Union of Artists of Ukraine in 1956.

Zaretsky was part of the Sixtiers movement, advocating for the development of the Ukrainian language and culture. In 1963, he became the chairman of the Kyiv Club of Creative Youth. At the end of the 1960s, Zaretsky was expelled from the Union of Artists of Ukraine after signing a public letter denouncing ongoing political trials and illegal arrests of Ukrainian artists and intellectuals. In 1970, Zaretsky's wife and father both died in what was ruled to be a murder-suicide. Later declassified documents implicated government authorities in the deaths. Following the death of his wife and father, Zaretsky developed long-term depression. In 1978, he opened his own art studio. The studio was attended by over 200 students, including Arsen Savadov.

Viktor Zaretsky died 23 August 1990 in Kyiv, Kyiv Oblast, Ukrainian SSR. He was buried in the Berkovtsi Cemetery.

== Art ==
Zaretsky produced a variety of paintings, designs, and murals. At the beginning of his career, Zaretsky often practiced the Soviet government favoured art style of Socialist realism. His early work often depicted peasants and labourers, who he felt more connected to rather than other popular subjects of the movement. As he continued creating art, his style began to become more avant-garde. Later in his career his main painting styles was Secession-style art. His art often contained references to, or elements of, Ukrainian folklore and figures.

His first solo art exhibition was hosted in 1989 at the Kyiv House of Scientists. The 1989 exhibition was his only solo art exhibition before his death in 1990.

In 1994, Zaretsky was posthumously awarded the Shevchenko National Prize for his artwork.
