= Boris Chichibabin =

Ukrainian poet (1923–1994)

- Борис Чичибабин
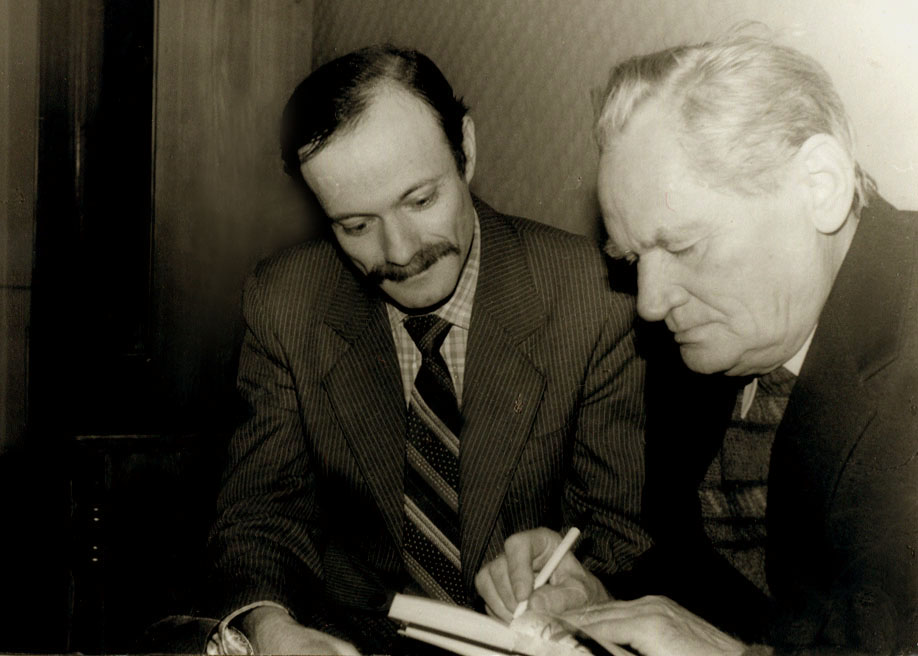
- Chichibabin (right) autographs his book for Grigory Hansburg in the National Union of Composers of Ukraine, 4 March 1992
- Born: Boris Alekseyevich Polushin; 9 January 1923; Kremenchuk, Ukrainian SSR, Soviet Union
- Died: 15 December 1994 (aged 71); Kharkiv, Kharkiv Oblast, Ukraine
- Education: University of Kharkiv
- Occupation: Poet
- Writing career
- Notable awards: USSR State Prize, Order of Merit (Ukraine)

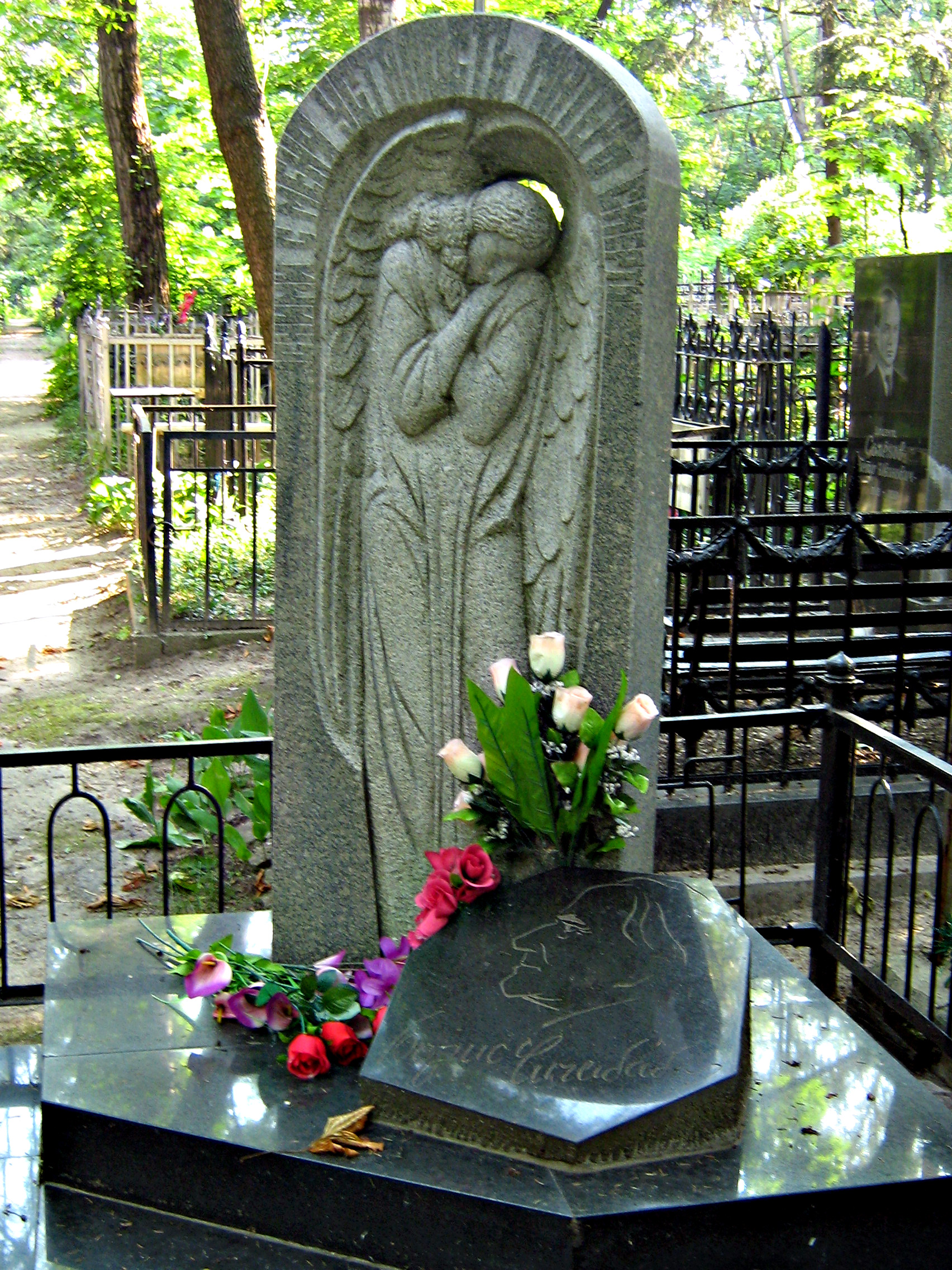
Boris Chichibabin's tomb

Boris Alekseyevich Chichibabin (né Polushin; Ukrainian: Борис Олексійович Чичибабін, romanized: Borys Olekisyovych Chychybabin; 9 January 1923 – 15 December 1994) was a Russian-language Ukrainian poet and a laureate of the USSR State Prize (1990), who is typically regarded as one of the Sixtiers.

He lived in Kharkiv, and in the course of three decades became one of the most famous and best-loved members of the artistic intelligentsia of the city, i.e., from the 1950s to 1980s. From the end of the 1950s, his poetry was widely distributed throughout the Soviet Union as samizdat. Official recognition came only at the end of his life in the time of perestroika.

== Life and work ==
Boris Chichibabin was the son of an army officer was educated in Chuguev in Kharkov oblast. His pseudonym was taken in honour of his uncle once removed on his mother's side, the academic Aleksei Chichibabin, an eminent chemist and one of the first Soviet 'nonreturnees'. In 1940, Boris began his studies at the Kharkov Institute, but on the outbreak of war was called up to the Caucasus Front.

In 1945 he entered the philological department of the Kharkov State University, but by June 1946 had been arrested and sentenced to five in the camps for "anti-Soviet agitation". The cause of his arrest was his poetry itself.

In prison Chichibabin wrote "Красные помидоры" (Red tomatoes), in the gulag "Махорку" (To cheap tobacco), and two spectacular pieces "тюремной лирики" (Lyrics from the Gaol). This poetry, put to music by the actor and singer Leonid Pugachev, is widely known throughout Russia.

By the 1950s, by the time of his release from the camps, the principal themes of Chichibabin's writing were already marked out. Above all these are the lyrics of the citizenry. "The new Radischev is angry and sad" reminds us of the "state boors" in his poem of 1959, "Клянусь на знамени весёлом" "I bow to the banner of jollity" ("Не умер Сталин", or "Stalin did not die").

Chichibabin died in 1994.

== Bibliography ==
- Мороз и солнце [Frost and sunshine] (in Russian). Kharkov. 1963.
- Молодость [Youth] (in Russian). Moscow: Soviet Writer. 1963.
- Гармония [Harmony] (in Russian). Kharkov. 1965.
- Плывет Аврора: Книга лирики [Avrora sails: a book of lyrics] (in Russian). Kharkov: Prapor. 1968.
- Колокол: Стихи [Bell: poems] (in Russian). Moscow: Izvestiya. 1989.
- Мои шестидесятые [My sixties] (in Russian). Kiev: Dnipro. 1990. ISBN 5-308-00690-3.
- Цветение картошки: Книга лирики [Flowering of potatoes: a book of lyrics] (in Russian). Moscow: Moscow Worker. 1994. ISBN 5-239-01703-4.
- Чичибабин, Борис (1994). 82 сонета + 28 стихотворений о любви [82 sonnets + 28 love poems] (in Russian). Moscow. ISBN 5-239-01703-4.
- В стихах и прозе [In poetry and prose] (in Russian). Kharkov: Joint enterprise "Karavella". 1995.
