= Halyna Zubchenko =

Ukrainian artist (1929–2000)

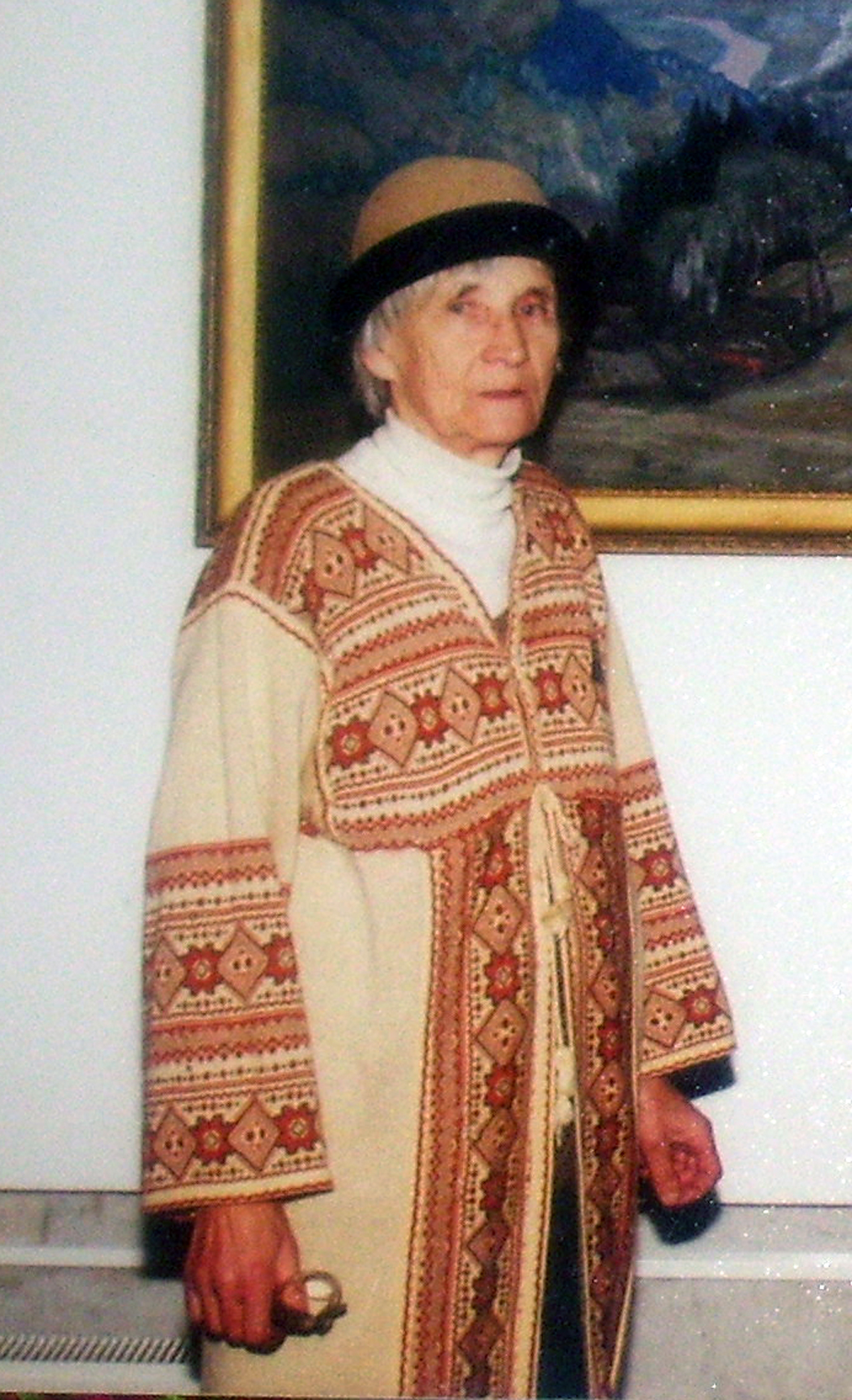
- Halyna Zubchenko at an art exhibition in Kyiv, 1999
- Born: Halyna Olexandrivna Zubchenko; 19 July 1929; Kyiv, Ukraine
- Died: 4 August 2000 (aged 71); Kyiv, Ukraine
- Education: Kyiv Art Institute
- Known for: Painting, mural

Halyna Olexandrivna Zubchenko (Ukrainian: Галина Олександрівна Зубченко; 19 July 1929 – 4 August 2000) was a Ukrainian painter, muralist, social activist and member of the Club of Creative Youth. She joined the Union of Artists of Ukraine in 1965.

== Early life ==
Halyna Zubchenko was born in Kyiv in 1929 into a family of scholars. Her father, Alexander Avksentevich Zubchenko, studied agricultural sciences and her mother, Hanna Skrypchynska, was a researcher at the Academy of Sciences of Ukraine.

=== Career beginnings ===
Zubchenko's first art teacher was Okhrim Kravchenko, a painter of the Boychukist school. She continued her studies at the Palace of Children's Creativity under Elizabeth Piskorska, a student of Fedir Krichevsky and Mykhailo Boychuk.

From 1944 to 1949, Zubchenko attended the Republican Art School, where she took painting and drawing lessons from Vladimir Bondarenko, another disciple of Fedir Krichevsky. After secondary school, she studied at the Kyiv State Art Institute under Oleksii Shovkunenko. She graduated in 1959.

In the summer of 1956, Zubchenko went to Lemkivshchyna, a region in the lowest part of the Carpathian Mountains, to practise en plein air painting. She became keenly interested in the customs of the local Hutsul community; drawing inspiration from their everyday life, she set to make studies and sketches that would become the base for her painting Arkan, completed later that year. Many years later, the painter said, "The Carpathians are my inner world, my dream that has come true. Since my childhood, I've been living in two different epochs: in the ancient times of Kievan Rus and the present. I've been always so much attracted to the ancient past but I could not find what I was looking for in Kyiv. But there, in the mountains, I've discovered the spirit of ancient times ... of ancient Kyiv ... I've seen it in the way people live, in the clothes they wear, in their customs, in the way they speak."

In 1957, Zubchenko returned to the Carpathians, this time to Richka, a village near the River Kosovo, where she lived with a Hutsul family. There she painted various portraits and landscapes, including A Girl from the Village of Richka, Willows, Without a Musician There Would Not Be a Fest, and Where the Mountain Bears Live. The following summer, she went to the village of Brustory to continue with her series of portraits. She painted Girls from the Village of Brustory (now part of a private collection in Philadelphia, United States), A Girl among Flowers, Semen Paliy, A Churchwarden, A Little Princess (now part of a private collection in Australia), Silver Evening, A Neighbour's House and many landscapes.

=== Graduation ===
Zubchenko decided to paint a traditional Hutsul wedding for her degree. Hutsul Wedding, large oil on canvas, depicts a wedding procession coming down a hill; it is one of her central works, in which she reflected the experience of traveling around the Carpathians for three years.

The Kyiv State Art Institute staff found the painting overly nationalistic and compelled Zubchenko to modify it. Even though Oleksii Shovkunenko, the supervisor of her project, strove to avoid this, she had to change the background and the appearance of the main figures.

== Carpathian paintings ==
Between 1959 and 1964, Zubchenko made several visits to the Carpathian Mountains and produced another series of paintings of the Ukrainian countryside and Hutsul people. Some of the works from this period are Moysyuchka, Princess Paraska, An Old Fortune Teller, Mistress of the Mountains, various portraits of men (Owner, Hutsul Nicholas, Legin) and children (Vasyuta, Vasyuta and his brother, Chichko) and the landscapes Above the Cheremosh, Clouds Walk above Verkhovyna and Dreamy Evening.

== Monumental art ==
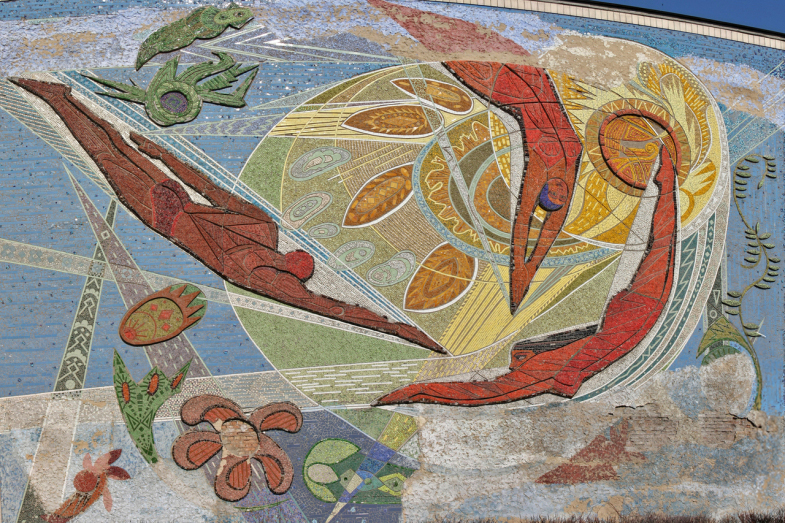
Movement, (1969). Mosaic. Science Sports Palace in Svyatoshino, Kyiv.

In 1962, Zubchenko joined the Club of Creative Youth (Клуб творчої молоді), a multidisciplinary group founded by Les Tanyuk in 1959 and dedicated to promoting the Ukrainian culture. She and other artist friends – Alla Gorska, Nadiya Svitlychna, Victor Zaretsky, Halyna Sevruk and Lyudmila Semykina – created a division specialising in visual arts, directed by Veniamin Kushnir.

In 1964 Zubchenko, Gorska, Opanas Zalyvakha, Semykina and Sevruk made Shevchenko. Mother, a stained glass window for the lobby of the Red building of the Kyiv National University. As the work was considered "ideologically hostile", the university's authorities ordered to destroy it.

In 1965, while working for the Academy of Architecture, Zubchenko was commissioned to decorate the exterior walls of School No. 5 in Donetsk. Alla Horska helped her with the sketches for the eight mosaics, which measured between 10 m^{2} (110 sq ft) and 15 m^{2} (160 sq ft) each. While working on the sketches, Zubchenko and Gosrka consulted painter Gregory Sinica, who became director of the project. Other members of the Club of Creative Youth such as Zaretsky, Svitlychna, Gennady Marchenko and Vasil Parakhin collaborated with them. Participated in the creation of the following monumental and decorative panels: "Space", "Elements of water", "Fire", "Earth", "Miner's Edge" ("Prometheus"), "Wind and Willow", "Sun", "Subsoil", "Animal World".

Zubchenko married painter Gregory Pryshedko in 1967. The couple worked together for ten years on the decoration of several public buildings in Mariupol and Kyiv – in particular, the institutes of the Academy of Sciences of Ukraine. They produced the large-scale mosaics Blooming Ukraine (1967, Zhdanov), Movement (1969, Science Sports Palace in Svyatoshino, Kyiv), Victory (1971, Institute of Oncology, Kyiv), Blacksmiths of Modernity (1974, Institute for Nuclear Research, Kyiv), Masters of Time (1975, Institute of Cybernetics, Kyiv) and The Triumph of Cybernetics (1977, Institute of Cybernetics, Kyiv). After Pryshedko died in 1978, she continued working on monumental art designs.

== 1980s – 1990s ==
In 1981, Zubchenko made the stained glass window Spring, Summer, Autumn for the Institute of Urology in Kyiv and various mosaics for the Dubrava Health Resort in Zheleznovodsk, such as Legend of the Narty, Tales and Legends of the North Caucasus and Merry Sun. The remaining sketches and cartoons for these mosaics were transferred to the Museum of the Sixties, Kyiv, in 2010.

In 1985, Zubchenko returned to the Carpathian mountains after a long time. She painted The Last Ray of Sun, Rogatynyukiv's Farm, Princess Yaroslava and Carrying Pears and Plums.

Throughout the 1990s, Zubchenko worked on a series of more than 100 watercolours depicting Crimean natural sceneries, some of which are in the Simferopol Art Museum and the Sevastopol Art Museum in Crimea. She also painted views of the Kyiv Monastery of the Caves and landscapes of Central Ukraine, such as Morning above the Ros. Other works from this period, including The Power of the Spirit and Our Lady of Pochayiv, are based on Christian themes.

== Exhibitions ==
Zubchenko took part in several international, national and municipal expositions and organised five personal exhibitions. In 1999, the Embassy of Croatia in Ukraine invited her to stage an exhibition of her works in Zagreb.

Her paintings are in the Museum of Hutsul Folk Art in Kolomyia, the Mariupol Art Gallery, the Kirovohrad Art Museum, the Ivan Honchar Museum in Kyiv, the Sevastopol Art Gallery and the Simferopol Art Museum, as well as in art galleries and private collections in the United States, Canada, Argentina, Japan, Australia, Taiwan, Germany and Croatia.

== Gallery ==
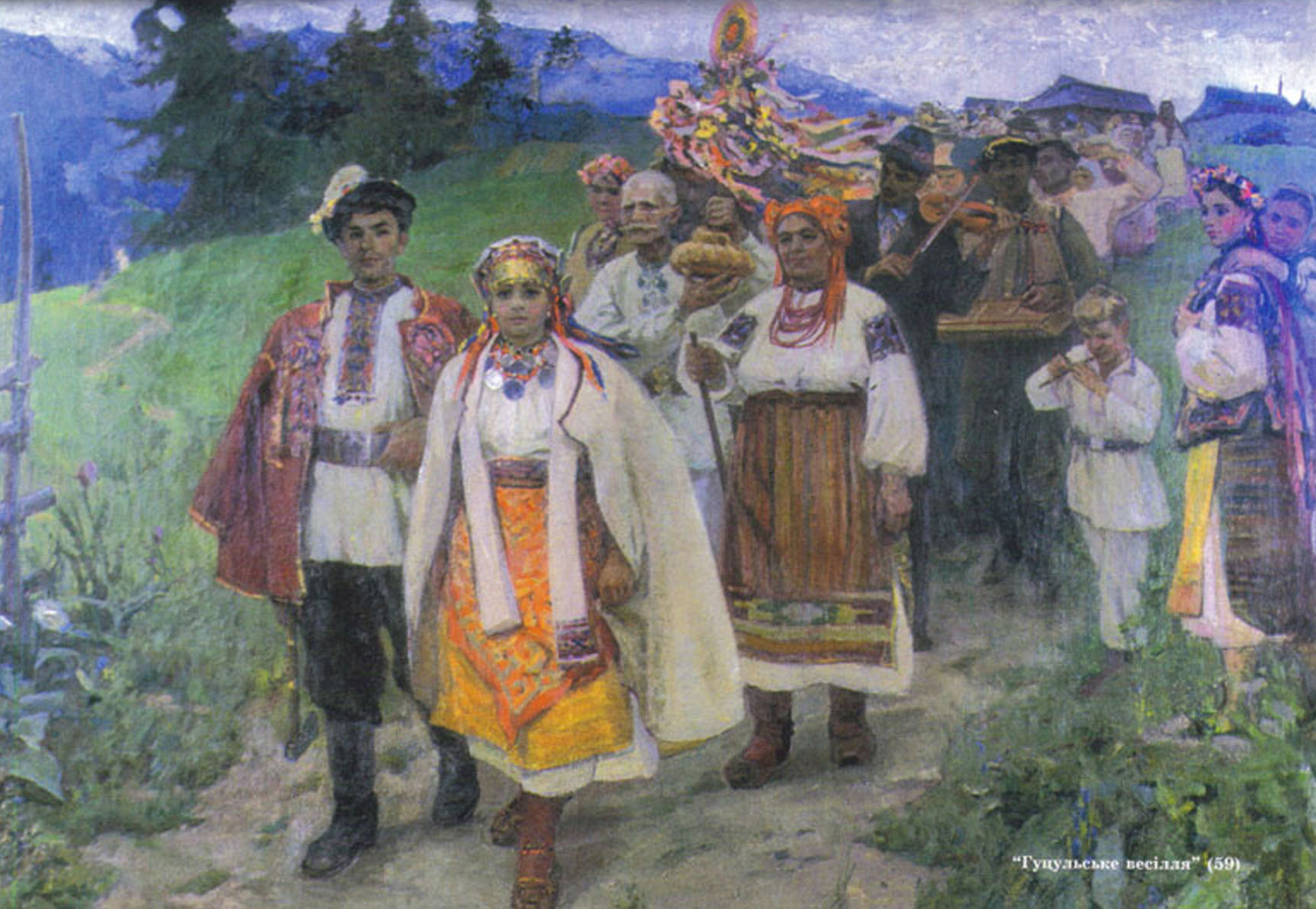
Hutsul Wedding, (1959). Oil on canvas, 180 × 241 cm.
Ivan Gonchar Museum, Kyiv.

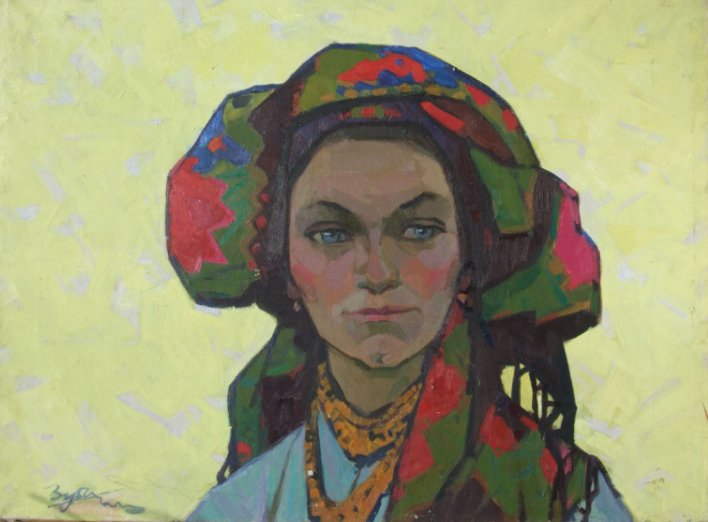
Mistress of the Mountains, (1962). Oil on canvas, 72 × 95 cm.

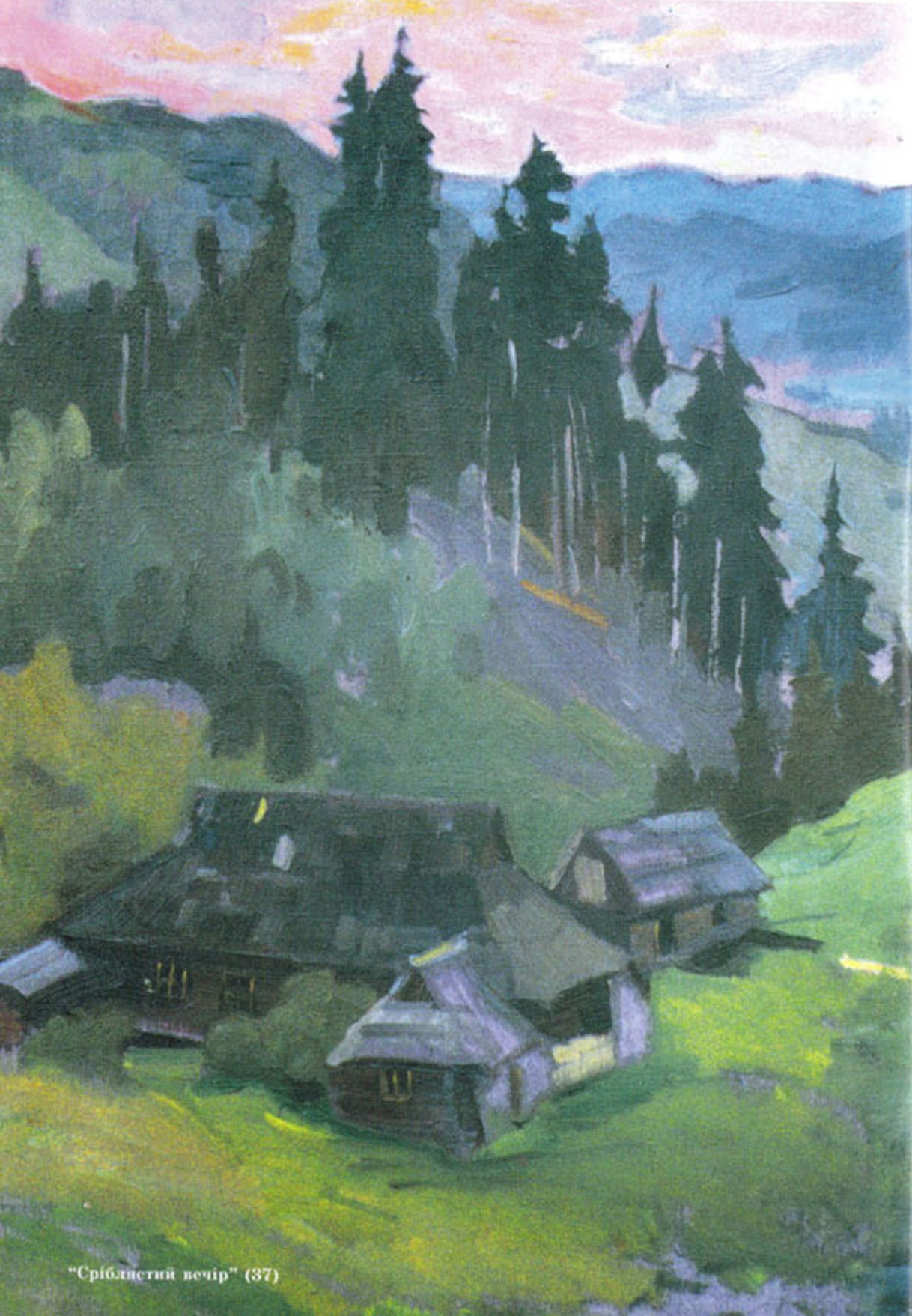
Silver Evening, (1963). Oil on canvas, 77.5 × 54 cm.
Ivan Gonchar Museum, Kyiv.

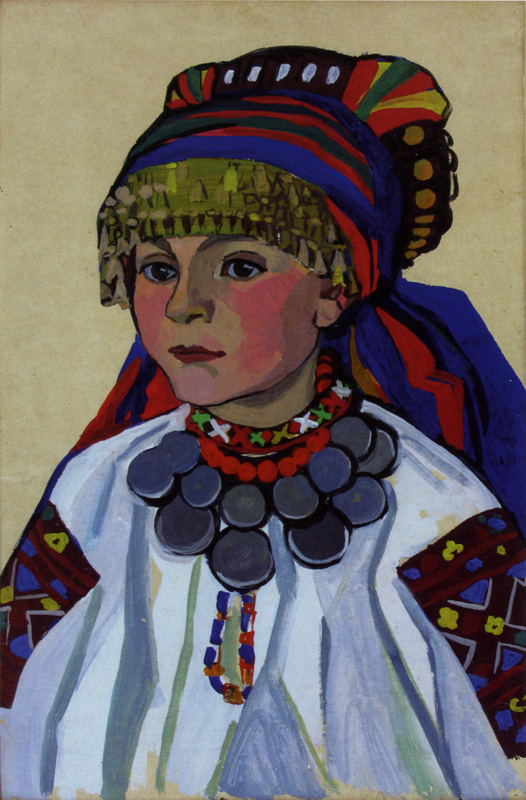
Princess Gannusya, (1962). Oil on canvas, 67 × 46 cm.

== Sources ==
- Korchinsky, Vasyl. "Згадую... (Спогади про Галину Зубченко) [I remember... (Memories about Galina Zubchenko)", Artanіya, No. 2, 2009. (in Ukrainian)
- Mitrofanov, Konstantin. Modern Monumental Decorative Ceramics. Moscow: Art (Искусство), 1967. (in Russian)
- Ogneva, Ludmila. Pearls of Ukrainian Monumental Art in Donbass. Ivano-Frankivsk: Lіleya HB, 2008. (in Ukrainian)
- Poshivaylo, Tetyana. Galyna Zubchenko's Ukrainian Carpathians. Catalogue. Kyiv: Іvan Gonchar Museum, 1999. (in Ukrainian and English)
- Sajenko, Nina (ed).Gregory Pryshedko (1927–1978), Galyna Zubchenko. Catalogue of Works. Kyiv: Union of Artists of Ukraine, 1987. (in Ukrainian)
- Shcherbak, Vasil. Contemporary Ukrainian Majolica. Kyiv: Scientific Thought (Наукова Думка), 1974. (in Ukrainian)
- Voeikova, Irina. Monumental Art and Contemporary Problems of Synthesis. Synthesis of Art and Architecture of Public Buildings. Moscow: Soviet Artist (Советский художник), 1974. (in Russian)
- Kyiv: Overview of Architectural Monuments and Ensembles. Kyiv: Budivelnyk, 1978. (in Russian)
- Voltsenburg, Oscar; Gorina, Tatiana. Artists of the USSR: Biobibliographical Dictionary, Vol.4. Moscow: Art (Искусство), 1983. (in Russian)
- Chornohora. Ukrainian Cooperative Calendar. Chicago, Ill., Hutsul society "Chornohora in Chicago", 1991.
- Works by Center of Heritage. Center of Heritage, National Academy of Sciences of Ukraine. Kyiv, 2011. (in Ukrainian)
- Yunakov, Oleg (2016). Architect Joseph Karakis (in Russian). Almaz. ISBN 978-1-68082-000-3.
