= Iryna Zhylenko =

Ukrainian poet

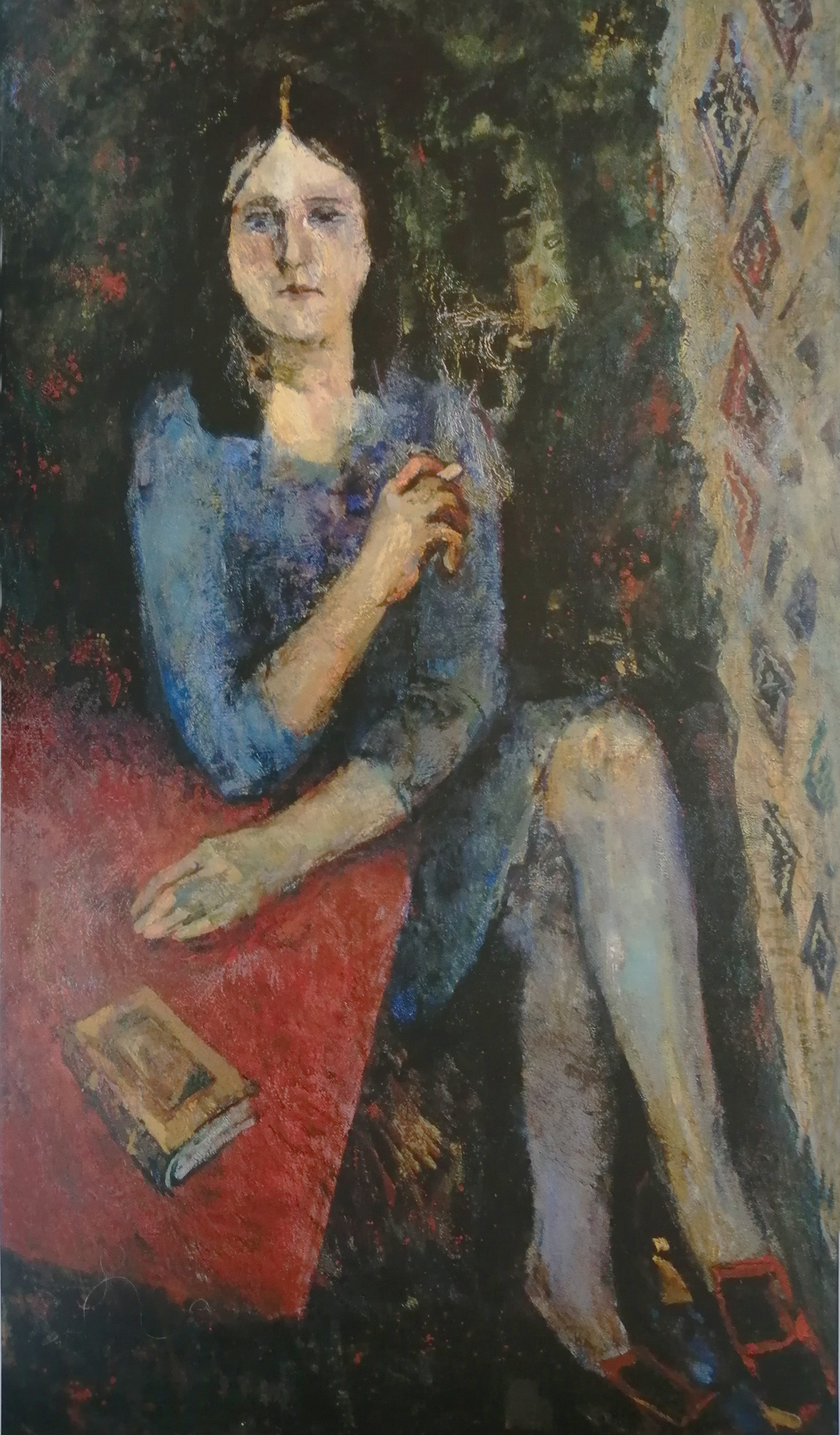

Irina (Iraida) Volodymyrivna Zhylenko (28 April 1941 – 3 August 2013), a Ukrainian poet who was the a wife of Volodymyr Drozd. She was born in Kyiv and died in August 2013 at the age of 72.

== Biography ==
In 1964, she graduated from the Taras Shevchenko University of Kyiv and published her first book of essays Bukovina Ballads.

She is the author of twelve books of poetry, including Solo for Sofia (1965), Self-Portrait in Red (1971), A Window into the Garden (1978), Concert for a Violin and a Grass-Hopper (1979), Market of Wonders (1982), The Last Street Organ-Grinder (1985), The Girl at the Ball (1987) Tea Ceremony (1987), An Evening Party in an Old Winery (1994) and Seasons (1999). She also wrote short stories and poetry for children.

English translations by Gladys Evans of her poems appeared in the Anthology of Soviet Ukrainian Poetry published in Kyiv in 1982. Virlana Tkacz and Wanda Phipps translated her poem “In the Country House” and Yara Arts Group performed it as part of its Spinning Spells: Poetry in Performance series. This translation was published in In a Different Light: A Bilingual Anthology of Ukrainian Literature Translated into English by Virlana Tkacz and Wanda Phipps and Performed by Yara Arts Group, edited by Olha Luchuk.

== Awards ==
In 1987, she received the Volodymyr Sosiura Literary Prize, in 1997 won Shevchenko National Prize for her work for her collection of poetry Verchirka u starii vynarni (An Evening Party in an Old Winery).
