= Artistic Youths' Club =

1960–1964 intellectual club in Kyiv, Ukraine

The Artistic Youths' Club (Ukrainian: Клуб творчої молоді, romanized: Klub tvorchoi molodi) was a club of Sixtier intellectuals active in the city of Kyiv, Ukraine active from 1960 to 1964. It was one of the early organisations of the Ukrainian Soviet dissident movement, and preceded the emergence of samvydav.

== Overview ==
The Artistic Youths' Club was established formally as an organ of the Kyiv branch of the Komsomol in 1960, and held its first congress on 8 March 1960. Intended as an internationalist organisation, it almost exclusively consisted of Ukrainians affiliated with the Sixtier movement. Director Les Tanyuk became the club's head, and several sections were organised, dedicated to art, film, music, theatre, and writing, each being active in pursuing their own artform. The music section organised Ukraine's first jazz ensemble in Kyiv, while the theatre section established a troupe.

Ukrainian writer Stepan Protsiuk argued in 2018 that the Artistic Youths' Club had a significant impact on a revival of national consciousness among young Ukrainians, noting that they had come after the Holodomor, the Great Purge, World War II, and the death of Joseph Stalin. Ivan Drach, also a writer and himself a member of the club, concurred with such a statement, saying, "It was such an interesting world, because something new, a new life, as it were, had opened up after that terrible, scary winter."

By 1963 the Soviet authorities' attitude towards the Artistic Youths' Club was decidedly in opposition. Tanyuk was removed as the club's head and replaced with Viktor Zaretskyi in February, but the group continued to organise cultural events, including a lecture in memory of Vladimir Mayakovsky on 1 June 1963, an "Ivan Franko Evening" on 8 June, and an event in honour of Lesya Ukrainka on 31 July. When the last event was prohibited by the Soviet authorities, the club pressed on in secret, reading her works at the Kyiv Philharmonic. The Shevchenko Days of 1964 was celebrated by the group as their final major event before their dissolution.

The Artistic Youths' Club was disbanded in 1964, but by then Ukraine's Sixtiers had advanced to pursuits of samvydav, or self-publishing, and more politically inclined pursuits. The club's activities de facto continued until the 1965–1966 Ukrainian purge, when most of its former members were arrested.

== Similar organisations ==
Inspired by the Artistic Youths' Club, multiple other groups of Sixtiers appeared throughout Ukraine. One of the largest among these was the Lviv-based Artistic Youths' Club, which was headed by Mykhailo Kosiv and was more radical, concerning itself with the reestablishment of an independent Ukrainian state. Other groups existed in Odesa, Kharkiv, and Dnipropetrovsk.
