= Les Tanyuk =

Ukrainian theatre and film director, Soviet dissident and politician (1938–2016)

- Лесь Танюк
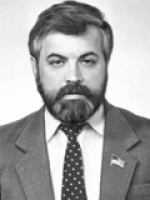
- Official portrait, 1990

People's Deputy of Ukraine
- In office 15 May 1990 – 23 November 2007
- Constituency: Kyiv, Vatutinskyi District (1990–1994); Lviv Oblast, Drohobych (1994–1998); Ternopil Oblast, No. 166 (1998–2002); Our Ukraine Bloc list No. 12 (2002–2006); Our Ukraine Bloc list No. 14 (2006–2007)

Personal details
- Born: 7 August 1938 Zhukyn, Ukrainian SSR, Soviet Union (now Ukraine)
- Died: 18 March 2016 (aged 77)
- Party: People's Movement of Ukraine
- Other political affiliations: Our Ukraine Bloc
- Education: National University of Theatre, Film and TV in Kyiv

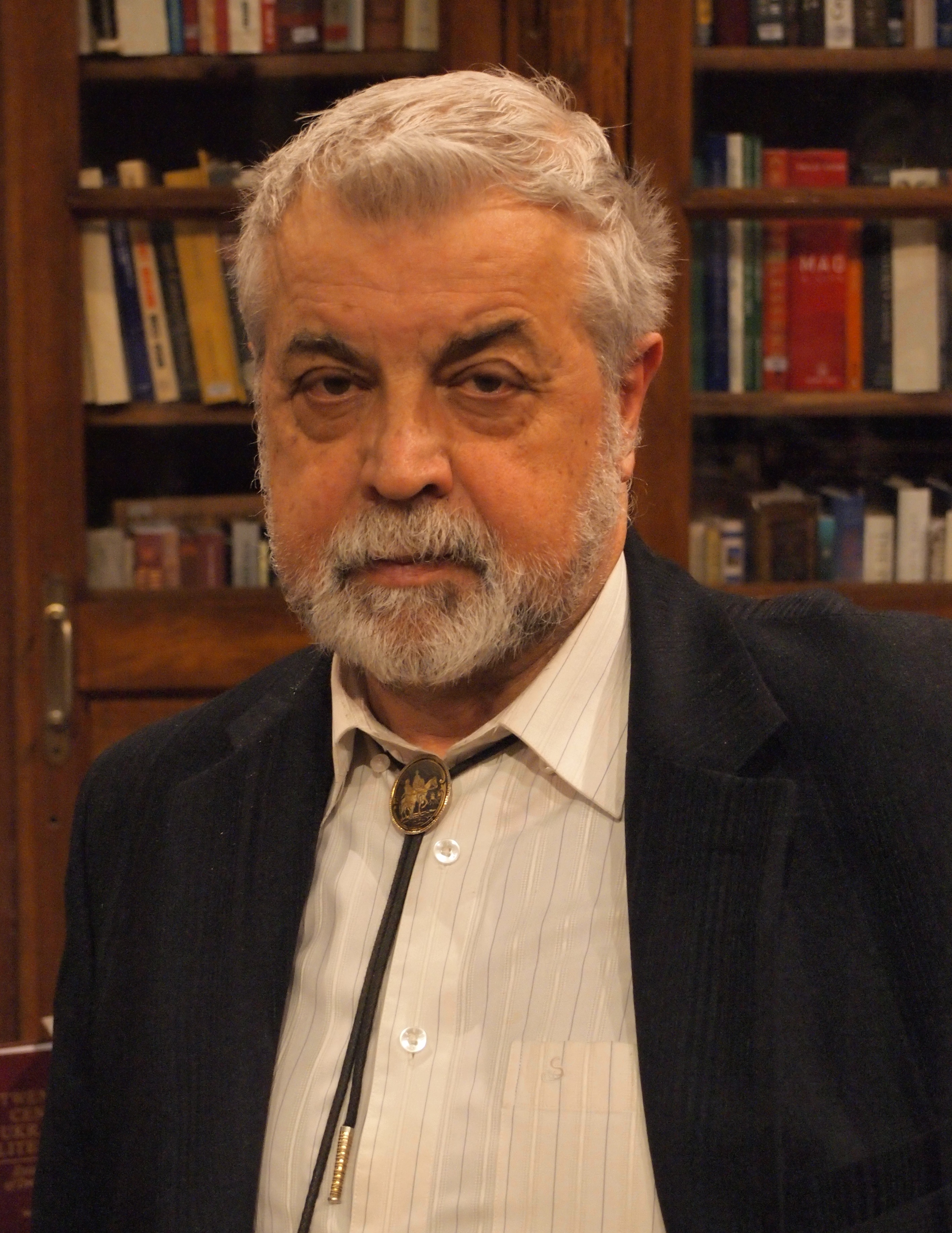
Taniuk in 2011

Leonid Stepanovych Tanyuk (also spelled Taniuk; Ukrainian: Леонід Степанович Танюк; 7 August 1938 – 18 March 2016) was a Ukrainian theatre and film director, Soviet dissident and politician. A founder of the Artistic Youths' Club in Kyiv in the early 1960s, he served as a People's Deputy of Ukraine from 1990 to 2007—representing Kyiv, Drohobych and Ukraine's 166th electoral district for the People's Movement of Ukraine before later being elected on the proportional list of the Our Ukraine Bloc. He died on 18 March 2016.

He was married to Nelli Korniyenko, a native of Khabarovsk and a Merited Worker of Arts of Ukraine.

== Early life ==
Tanyuk was born in the village of Zhukyn (now Vyshhorod Raion, Kyiv Oblast). His parents were language teachers. As a child he was imprisoned in several Nazi concentration camps during the Second World War and was reunited with his family after the war. He later studied at the National University of Theatre, Film and TV in Kyiv.

== Dissident and cultural activities ==
In 1959 Tanyuk co-founded the Artistic Youths' Club (Клуб творчої молоді) in Kyiv, serving as its first president. The club promoted Ukrainian culture and petitioned authorities to preserve historical monuments. In 1962 Tanyuk, Vasyl Symonenko and Alla Horska investigated reports of mass graves in Bykivnia and appealed to the authorities for an official inquiry; the club was closed by 1964 amid increased pressure.

== Parliamentary career ==
At the 1990 Ukrainian parliamentary election Tanyuk was elected to the Verkhovna Rada for Kyiv’s Vatutinskyi District; he was re-elected for Drohobych in 1994 and for Ukraine's 166th electoral district (Ternopil Oblast) in 1998 as a member of the People's Movement of Ukraine. He later entered parliament on the proportional list of the Our Ukraine Bloc in 2002 (No. 12) and 2006 (No. 14).

== Death ==
Tanyuk died on 18 March 2016, aged 77.
