= Liudmyla Semykina =

Painter from Odesa (1924–2021)

Liudmyla Semykina

Liudmyla Nikolaevna Semykina (Ukrainian: Людмила Миколаївна Семикіна) (23 August 1924 – 12 January 2021) was an artist and painter from Odesa, Ukraine, and an Honored Artist of Ukraine (2009). She was awarded the Taras Shevchenko National Prize of Ukraine for a series of costumes for High Castle (1997) and a winner of the Vasyl Stus Prize (2000). Semykina is known for her artworks, including many paintings, landscapes, and still life portraits of Odesa.

== Biography ==
Semykina graduated from Grekov Odesa Art School in 1943 and the Kiev State Art Institute in 1953. She became a member of the Union of Artists of Ukraine in 1958. In 1964, one year after she joined the Club of Creative Youth in Kyiv, she was commissioned by the Kyiv University to paint an image. She created a stained-glass panel depicting an angry Taras Shevchenko holding a battered woman and a book. The battered woman in Semykina's work symbolized Ukraine. The painting's inscription says "I shall glorify these small dumb slaves, I shall put the word on guard beside them." This painting was later destroyed by the Communist government. Due to her public petitions and political activities she was expelled from the Union of Artists of the Ukrainian SSR in 1968. From 1968 to 1988 Semykina designed traditional Ukrainian outfits. Some of which came to be used in films such as Zakhar Berkut. In the year 1988 she rejoined the Union of Artists. Semykina believed that the Krushschev Thaw, which was a period of de-stalinization in the Soviet Union, was about a central message of "You are a person, respect yourself."

== Artwork ==
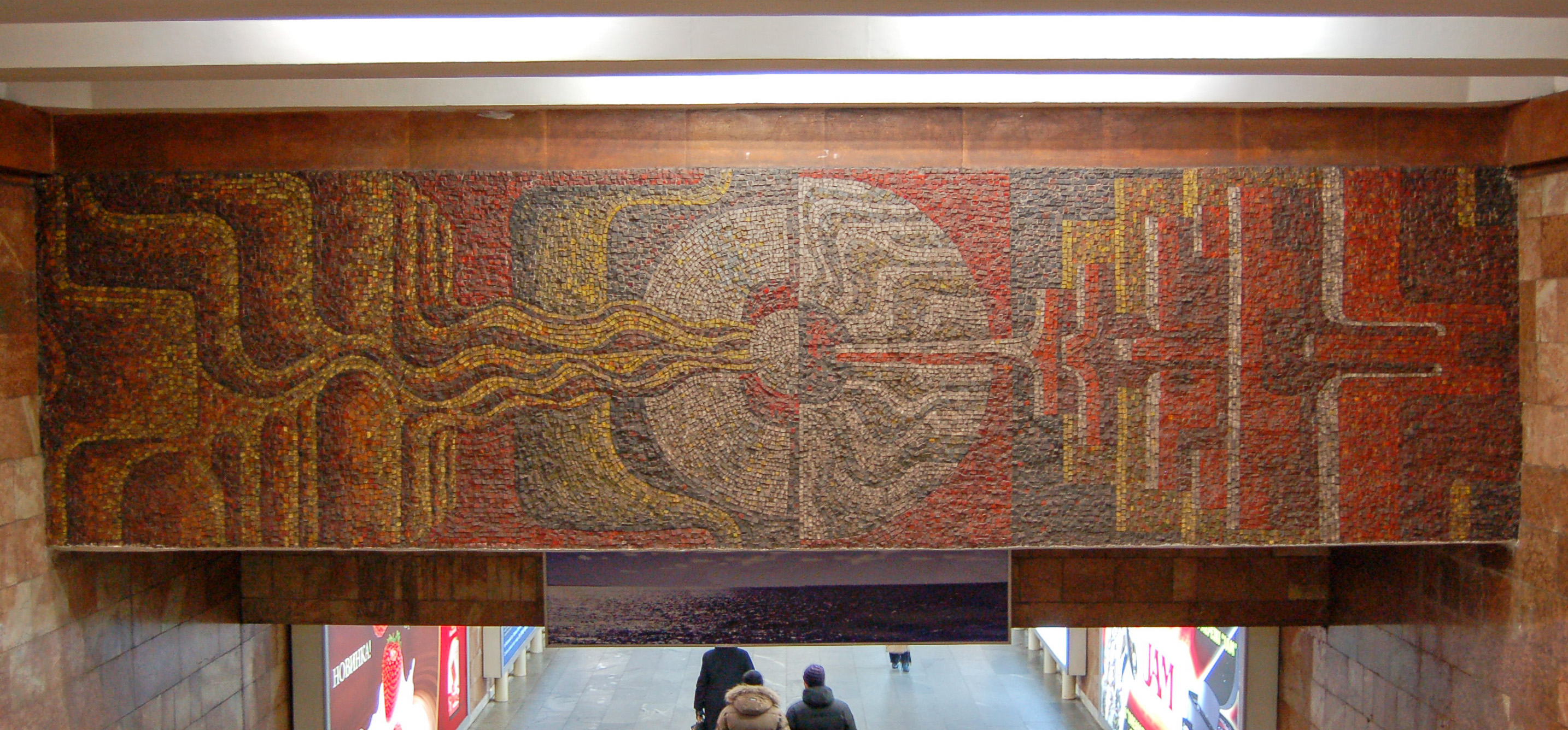
Pochayna Metro Station, mosaic above the stairs to the platform, south exit

- Group Portrait of the Old Bolshevik Arsenals (1954).
- In the port of Odesa.
- Winter Evening
- Twilight "After the round" (1954).
- Windy Day (1957).
- Repair of the berth (1960).
- Mornings (1961).
- The Legend of Kyiv (1966).
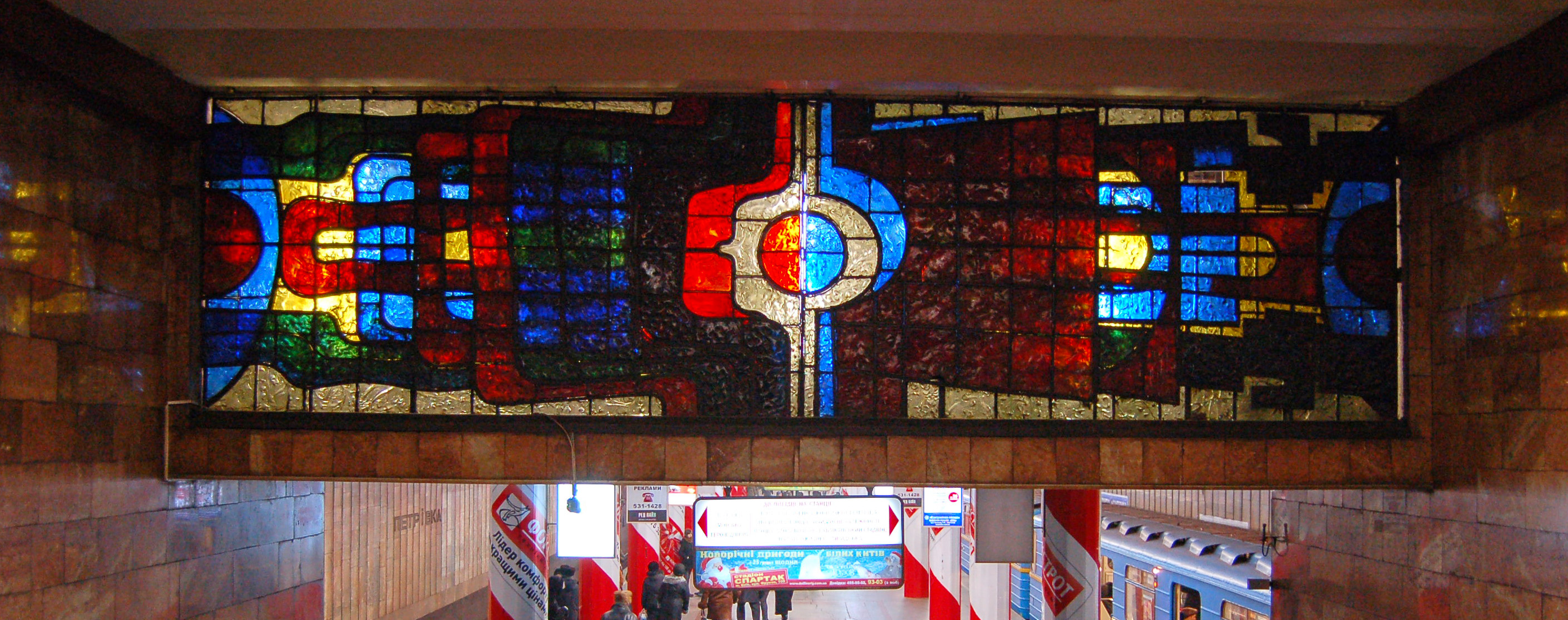
- Pochayna Metro Station, stained glass window above the stairs to the platform, north exit
  Stained glass window "Taras Shevchenko at the University of Kiev" (co-authored, destroyed in May 1964).
- Sketches of costumes for the film "Zahar Berkut" (1970–1971).
- Design of Pochayna metro station (1980)

=== Literature ===
- Taras Shevchenko at the University of Kiev (co-authored, destroyed in May 1964).
- Sketches of costumes for the film Zahar Berkut (1970–1971).
- Encyclopedia of Ukrainian Studies (Ukr.) / V. Kubiyovych – Paris; New York
- Young Life, 1954–1989. Art of Ukraine: Biographical Handbook, edited by AV Kudrytsky, MG Labinsky.
- Ukrainian Encyclopedia, 1997. pp. 531–532 – ISBN 5-88500-071-9.

=== Buildings ===
- Scythian steppe
- Polish legend
- Princely era
- Retro
- Modern (1965–1996).
- Design of Pochayna metro station (1980)
