= 1989–1991 Ukrainian revolution =

1989–1991 mass movement in Ukraine

- Part of Perestroika, the Revolutions of 1989, and the dissolution of the Soviet Union
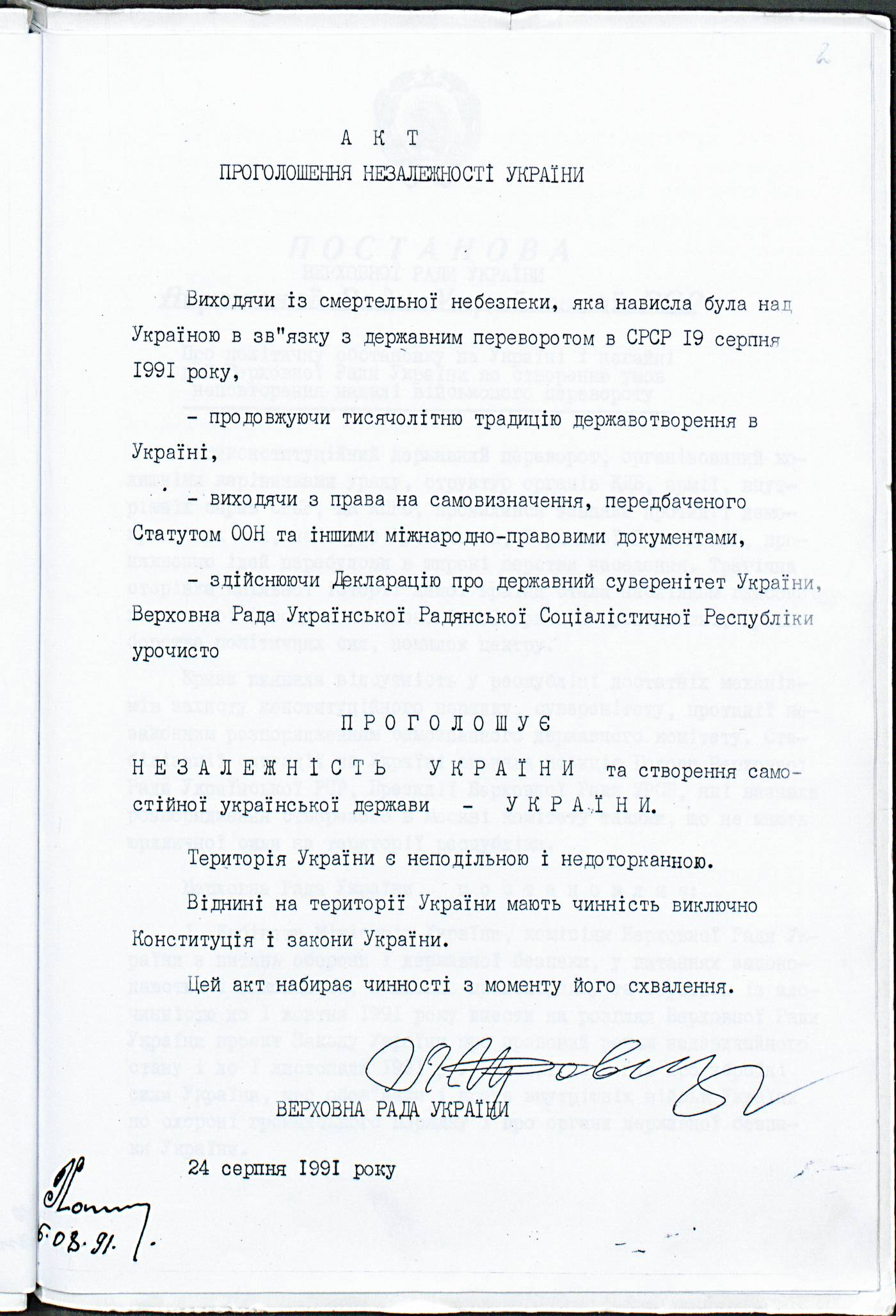
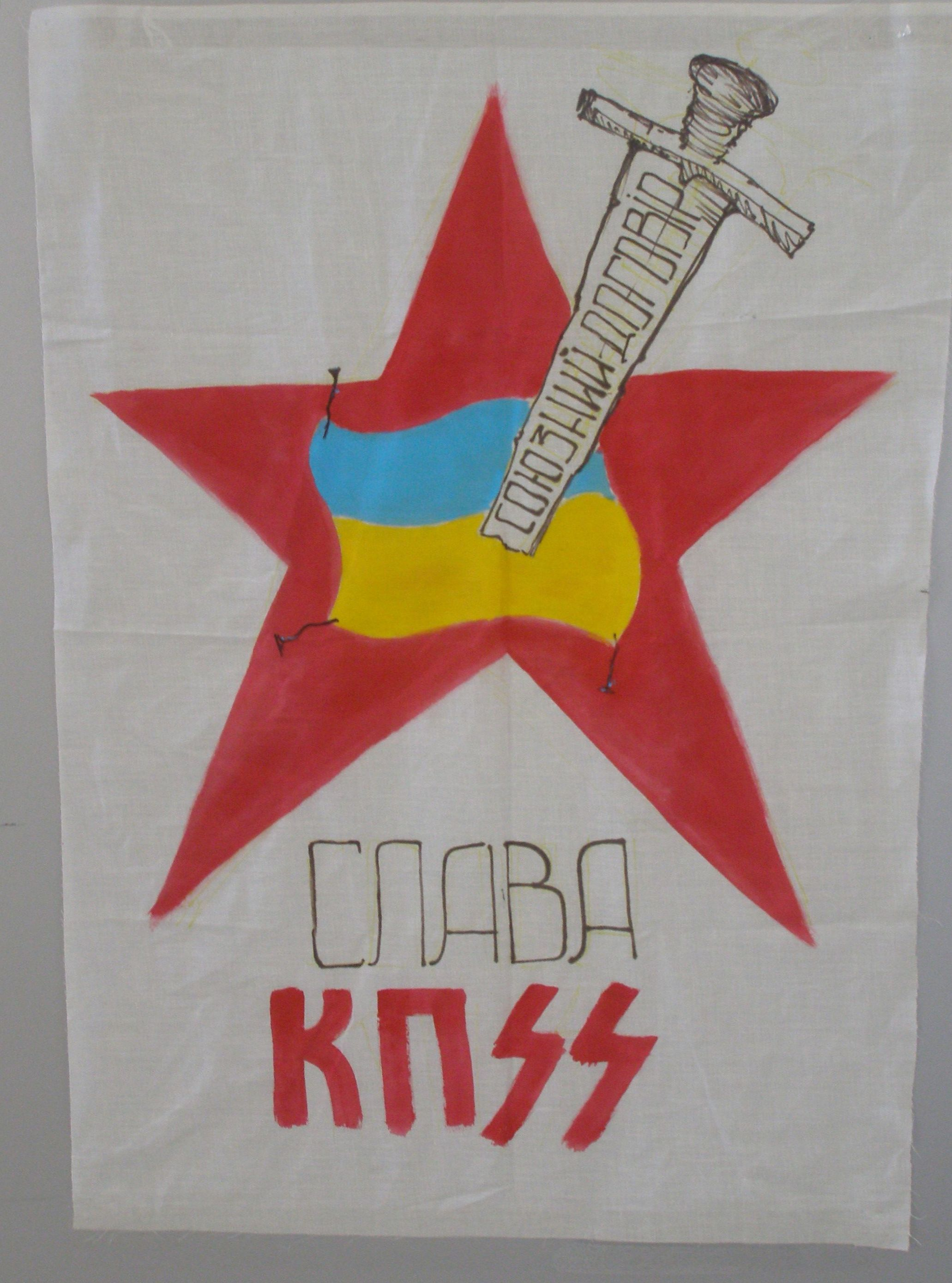
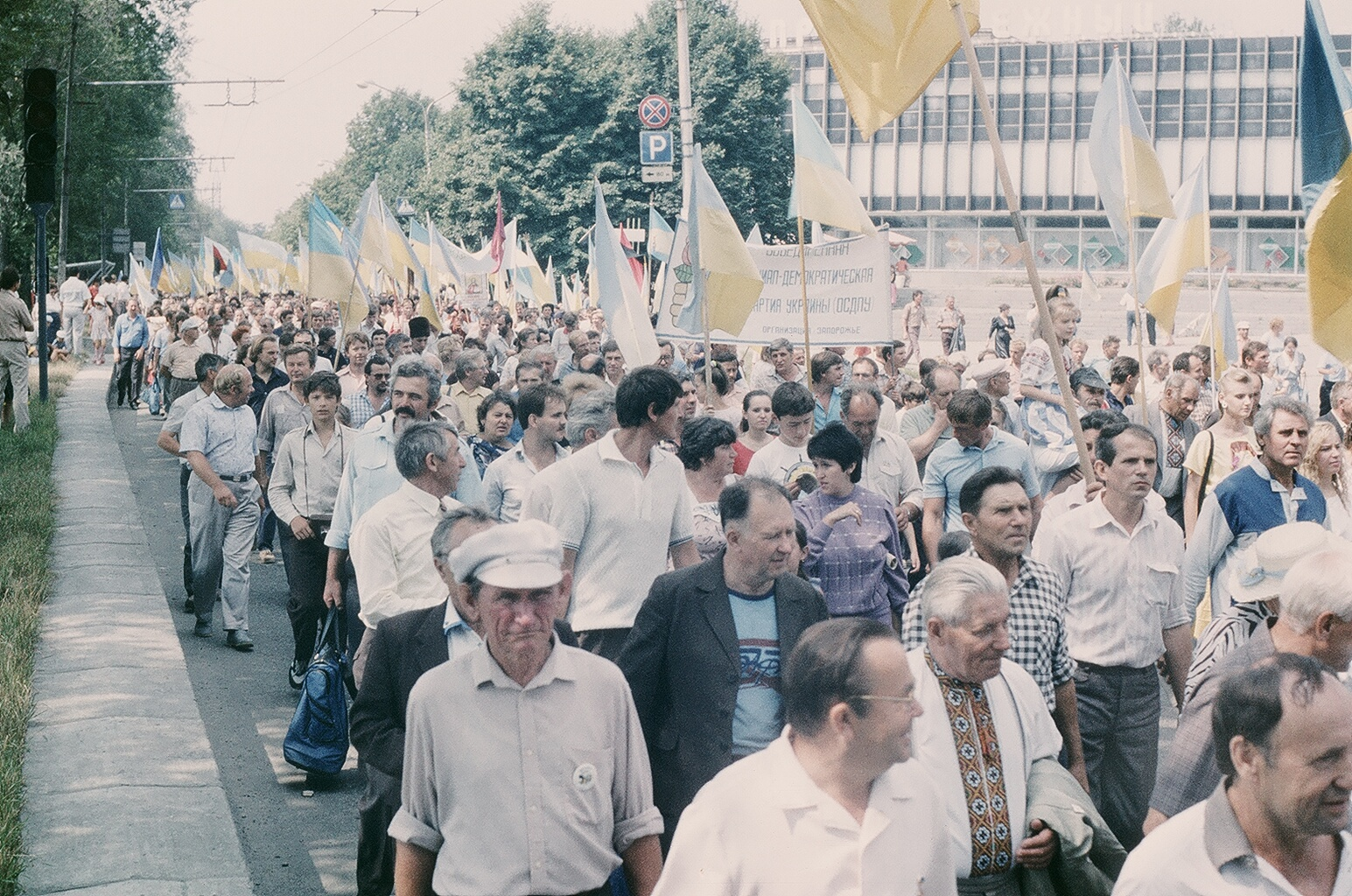
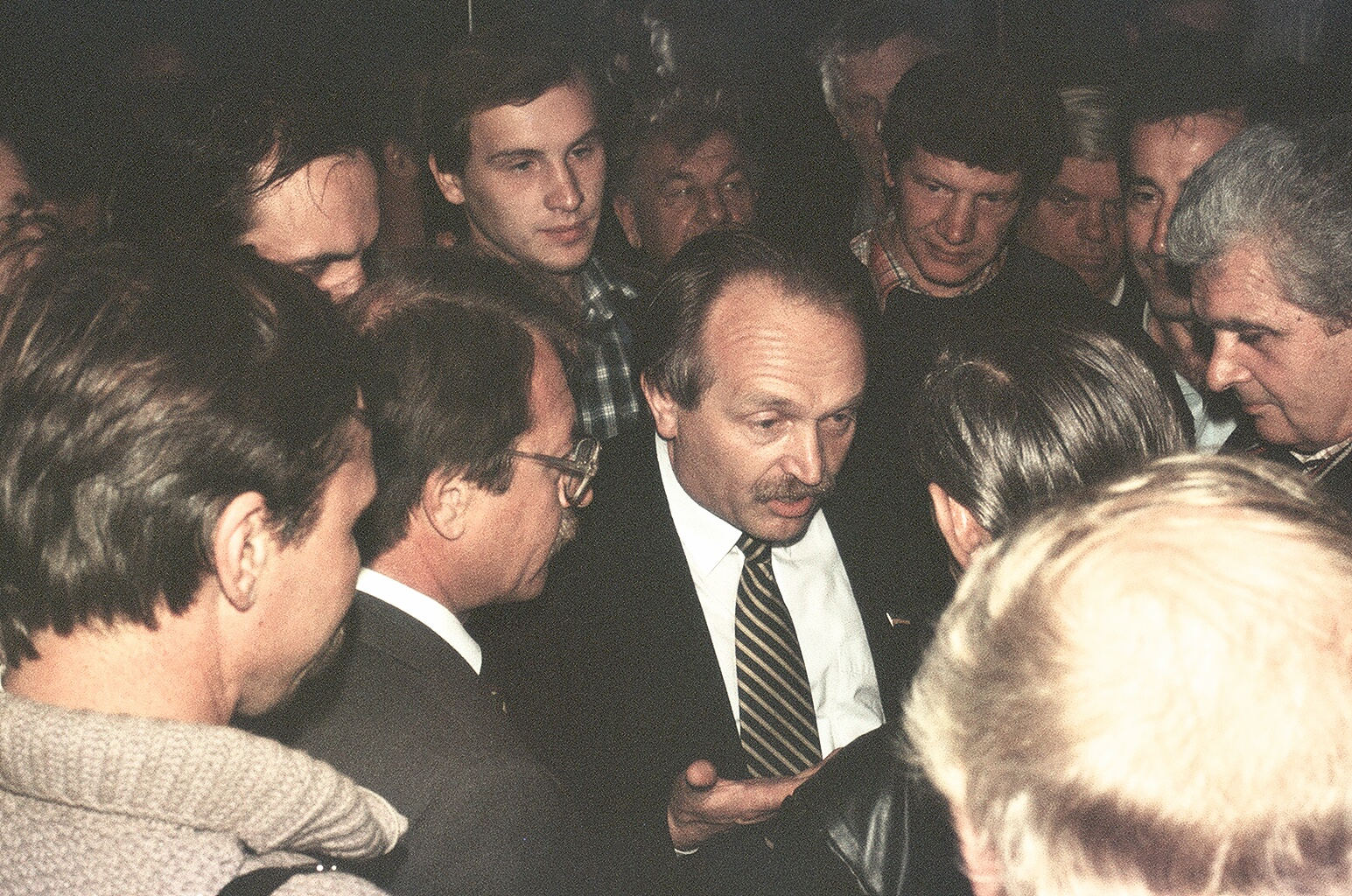
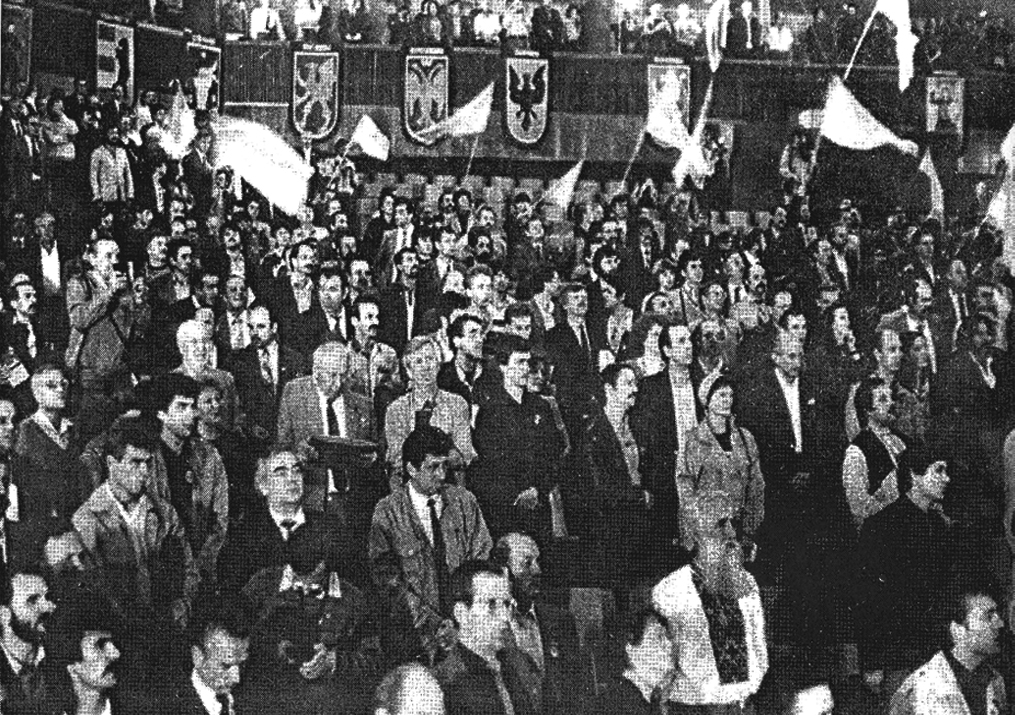
- Clockwise from top left: the 1991 Declaration of Independence of Ukraine, a student poster comparing the CPSU and Schutzstaffel from the Revolution on Granite, Viacheslav Chornovil meeting with striking miners during the 1990s Donbas miners' strikes, the First Convention of the People's Movement of Ukraine, Ukrainians celebrating the 500th anniversary of the Zaporozhian Sich
- Date: 18 July 1989 – 1 December 1991 (2 years, 4 months, 1 week and 6 days)
- Location: Ukrainian SSR, Soviet Union
- Caused by: Authoritarianism; Great Russian chauvinism; Soviet empire; Russian imperialism; Russification; Chernobyl disaster; Corruption; Economic decline; Effects of the Era of Stagnation
- Goals: Independence of Ukraine under a democratic government
- Methods: Civil disobedience, hunger strike, human chain, occupation, strike action
- Result: Protester victory; independence of Ukraine: Declaration of State Sovereignty of Ukraine (16 June 1990); 1991 Ukrainian sovereignty referendum (17 March); Declaration of Independence of Ukraine (24 August 1991); 1991 Ukrainian independence referendum (1 December); 1991 Ukrainian presidential election (1 December)

Parties
Ukrainian opposition; People's Movement of Ukraine; Democratic Bloc; Ukrainian Helsinki Group; Taras Shevchenko Society for the Ukrainian Language; Miners; Students; Communist Party (dissident faction)	Soviet Union; KGB; Militsiya; Communist Party; (Ukrainian Soviet Socialist Republic) Communist Party of Ukraine (loyalist faction)

Lead figures
Viacheslav Chornovil; Levko Lukianenko; Ihor Yukhnovskyi; Ivan Drach; Mykhailo Horyn; Dmytro Pavlychko; Volodymyr Biletskyy; Oles Donii	Mikhail Gorbachev; Volodymyr Shcherbytsky; Vladimir Ivashko; Stanislav Hurenko; Vitaliy Masol; Vitold Fokin; Valentyna Shevchenko; Leonid Kravchuk

From the formal establishment of the People's Movement of Ukraine on 1 July 1989 to the formalisation of the Declaration of Independence of Ukraine via referendum on 1 December 1991, a non-violent protest movement worked to achieve Ukrainian independence from the Soviet Union. Led by Soviet dissident Viacheslav Chornovil, the protests began as a series of strikes in the Donbas that led to the removal of longtime communist leader Volodymyr Shcherbytsky. Later, the protests grew in size and scope, leading to a human chain across the country and widespread student protests for further democratisation and the need to elect a non-Communist majority in the next parliamentary elections. The protests were ultimately successful, leading to the independence of Ukraine amidst the broader dissolution of the Soviet Union.

Marked by widespread displays of support for the cause of Ukrainian independence, the revolution ultimately acquired the support of large numbers of the population and ruling Communist Party elite, allowing Ukraine to become independent from the Soviet Union peacefully. Its causes include a mix of economic and political justifications, primarily relating to economic downturn and mismanagement, Russification, and authoritarianism during the Era of Stagnation and Shcherbytsky's 17-year rule. After the revolution, the democratic movement failed to replicate its successes in independent Ukraine, a fact owed to the splintering of the movement along ideological lines and the achievement of its primary goal. The revolution continues to be celebrated in present-day Ukraine, and the Independence Day of Ukraine is a national holiday.

== Background ==
Ukraine became independent from Russia as the Ukrainian People's Republic in 1917. Divided in 1921 between the Second Polish Republic and Soviet Union, the remaining western portion of Ukraine was further annexed by the Soviet Union as part of the Molotov–Ribbentrop Pact and formalised by the 1945 Potsdam Conference. 3.5 to 5 million Ukrainians were killed in the 1932–1933 Holodomor, a famine created by the Soviet government. Present-day historians debate whether the famine was an act of genocide against Ukrainians, a result of collectivisation in the Soviet Union, or an unintentional byproduct of collectivisation that was subsequently weaponised against Ukrainians. Ukrainians fought in both the Red Army and the Ukrainian Insurgent Army (which was at various points allied with or fighting against Nazi Germany) during World War II. The Ukrainian Insurgent Army continued to fight the Soviets after the war until 1949, though some units continued fighting until 1956.

During the Era of Stagnation, the Ukrainian Soviet Socialist Republic was ruled by First Secretary Volodymyr Shcherbytsky, a close ally of Soviet leader Leonid Brezhnev and a member of his Dnipropetrovsk Mafia political clique. Shcherbytsky took aim at nationally minded members of the Ukrainian intelligentsia; a 1973–1975 purge of the Communist Party of Ukraine resulted in the removal of around 5% of the party's members, and every member of the Ukrainian Helsinki Group of human rights activists was arrested and deported to labour camps. This was matched by a general crackdown on Ukrainian culture, a purge of Ukrainian academia and cultural institutions, and the systematic targeting of the Ukrainian language by the government. The 1979 removal of Valentyn Malanchuk, who had overseen the purges, did little to stem the tide of Russification, and further events celebrating the Russification of Ukraine occurred in 1982.

On top of political concerns, the Ukrainian economy continued to decline throughout the 1970s and 1980s, particularly in the eastern Donbas region, where metallurgy and coal mining were the main economic activities. The shift from coal to nuclear power devastated the local economy, and a combination of overly-centralised collective farms and droughts negatively affected Ukraine's agricultural economy. The 1986 Chernobyl disaster further galvanised growing opposition to the Soviet government in Ukraine. The liberalisation of Soviet society as part of Perestroika allowed greater room for free expression and self-identification, but the majority of these changes did not affect Ukraine to the same extent as other Soviet republics, or other countries within the Eastern Bloc. In 1989, however, Ukrainian pro-independence activity exploded, particularly in Western Ukraine, which had little experience being under Russia compared to other parts of Ukraine.

== History ==
=== Strikes, removal of Shcherbytsky, foundation of Rukh (1989) ===
A series of strikes by coal miners began in the Donbas on 18 July 1989, spurred by simultaneous strikes by miners in the Kuzbass region of Russia. The strikes, while based primarily on economic misfortunes, were also pro-independence in nature; the leaders of the strikes expressed overt support for the independence of Ukraine from the Soviet Union, so that the country could better manage its own economy. The response from Shcherbytsky's government was to use state media to discredit the strikers and restrict information about the spread of the strikes. The demands of the strikes became more overtly political, calling for the resignation of Shcherbytsky and Valentyna Shevchenko, Chairman of the Verkhovna Rada.

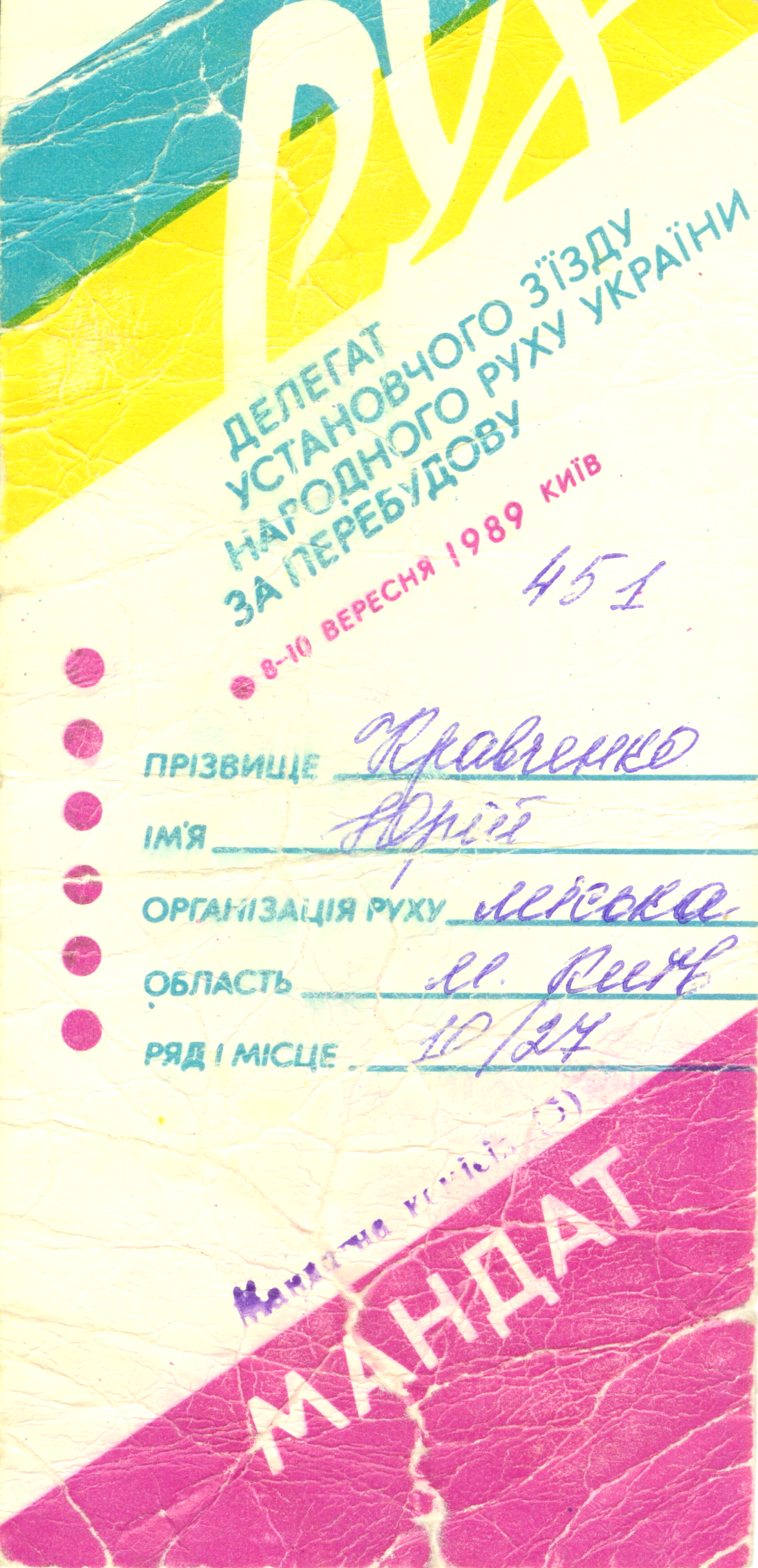
The card of a delegate to the First Convention of the People's Movement of Ukraine

By August 1989, Shcherbytsky's position within the Communist Party was tenuous. On one hand was intense pressures from the strikes, while on the other hand, as one of the last three remaining Brezhnevites to hold office in the Soviet Union, the Central Committee of the CPSU was simultaneously pushing for his resignation. In September 1989 he was removed from the Central Committee, and days later he was replaced as First Secretary of the KPU by Vladimir Ivashko. Shevchenko also later resigned.

Firing Shcherbytsky, however, did not stem the tide of activism. The People's Movement of Ukraine for Perestroika, founded days before Shcherbytsky's ouster by dissident leader Viacheslav Chornovil, was approved on the initiative of Leonid Kravchuk (at the time the only member of the Central Committee of the KPU who could speak Ukrainian). The People's Movement, or Rukh (lit. 'the movement'), was inspired by similar national organisations in other republics, particularly Sąjūdis in Lithuania. An earlier attempt in 1988 had been suppressed, and the name of this attempt had been chosen deliberately to convey the concept that Rukh was not in opposition to the CPSU, but rather in support of it.

Other protests against Shcherbytsky were held throughout the year, including protests against the Chernobyl disaster. The Chernobyl disaster became a rallying cry for protesters, being invoked as an effort to demonstrate the urgency of the situation.

Inspired by the Singing Revolution in Baltic countries, the first festival of Ukrainian popular music, Chervona Ruta, took place in Chernivtsi in September of 1989.

=== Human chain, Revolution on Granite, Zaporozhian Sich anniversary (1990) ===
Locations of Lviv and Kyiv on a map of Ukraine. The two cities were connected by a human chain of three million people in a January 1990 protest against the Soviet government.

The next year brought increasing protests. On 21 January 1990, the anniversary of the 1919 Unification Act between the Ukrainian People's Republic and West Ukrainian People's Republic, a human chain of three million people linked the western Ukrainian city of Lviv to Kyiv, Ukraine's capital. The human chain, which also drew hundreds of thousands of protesters to Sophia Square in Kyiv, demonstrated the popularity of Ukrainian independence outside of Western Ukraine. It was the largest demonstration in late-Soviet era Ukraine. The event was echoing a similar situation in Baltic states (Baltic Chain) less than a six months before.

The first multi-party elections to the Supreme Soviet of the Ukrainian Soviet Socialist Republic were held in March 1990. The Democratic Bloc, led by protester Ihor Yukhnovskyi, won 111 seats to the KPU's 331. The new Supreme Soviet in July 1990 passed the Declaration of State Sovereignty of Ukraine, by which the Ukrainian SSR gave itself the right to establish an army, central bank, and currency. The declaration further established Ukrainian citizenship, established the supremacy of Ukrainian laws over the laws of the central Soviet government in case of a dispute, and expressed the intentions to become a neutral and non-nuclear state.

On 2 October 1990, a group of students including Oles Donii began occupying the October Revolution Square in central Kyiv and launched a hunger strike. As part of their demands, they sought free and fair elections to the Supreme Soviet (no later than the spring of 1991), the nationalisation of property owned by the KPU, and the resignation of Chairman of the Council of Ministers Vitaliy Masol. They also sought to prevent the signing of the New Union Treaty by the Ukrainian SSR and the stationing of Ukrainian conscripts of the Soviet Army outside Ukraine. The protests garnered the attention of the Ukrainian public, and supporters of the protests came to October Revolution Square in a demonstration of solidarity with the students. Other organisations that were not already on strike moved to do so as a further show of support.

Fears held by protesters of a crackdown ultimately failed to emerge, and many of the Supreme Soviet's deputies sided with the students. After Kravchuk allowed Donii to express his demands within the Supreme Soviet on 15 October, the government acquiesced two days later. The same day, Masol resigned as Chairman of the Council of Ministers, and was replaced by Vitold Fokin.

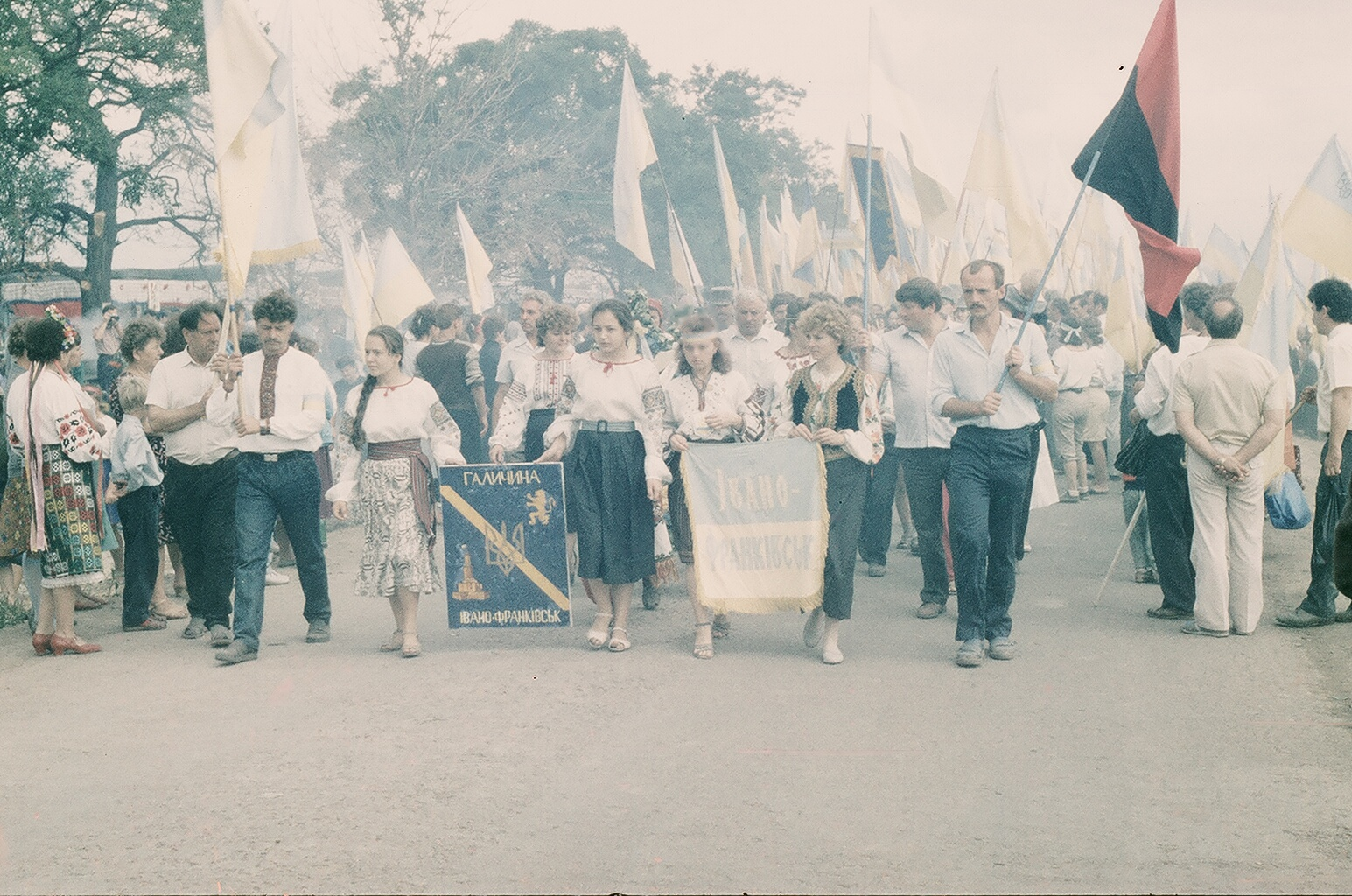
Participants in celebrations of the 500th anniversary of the Zaporozhian Sich

At the same time, Ukrainian independence activists were organising in less confrontational ways, including cooperation with the Soviet Ukrainian government on celebrating the 500th anniversary of the Zaporozhian Sich. As part of the three-day celebration in August 1990, soldiers of the Soviet Army helped install the flag of the Ukrainian Insurgent Army and provide accommodations for participants, while events included commemorations of Cossack leader Ivan Sirko and historian Dmytro Yavornytsky, a gathering of Cossack groups from throughout Ukraine, a scientific conference discussing the Zaporozhian Sich, and a 500,000-member march in the city of Zaporizhzhia. These celebrations helped to cement Cossacks as a part of the Ukrainian national consciousness.

=== Independence (1991) ===
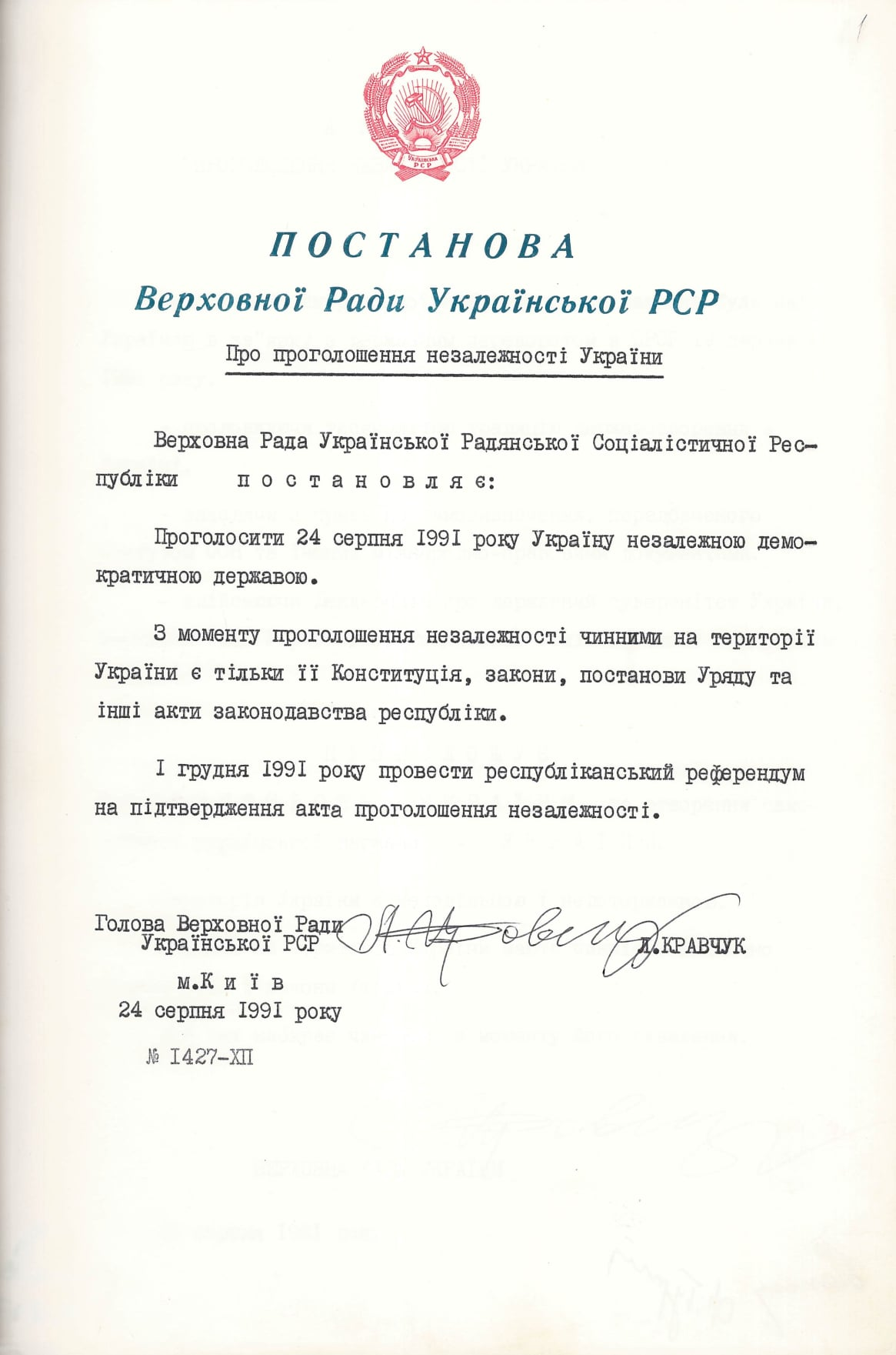
The resolution of the Supreme Soviet of the Ukrainian SSR on adopting the Declaration of Independence of Ukraine, 1991

1991 brought further victories for Rukh and the protest movement. On 17 March 1991 Ukraine's declaration of state sovereignty was confirmed in a referendum, with 81.69% voting in favour. Another referendum, held in the Lviv, Ivano-Frankivsk, and Ternopil oblasts (regions) alongside the sovereignty referendum, demonstrated 88.3% voting in favour. The growing scale of the protests drew the attention of United States President George H. W. Bush, who urged Ukrainians to stop pursuing independence in a 1 August 1991 speech, the so-callied Chicken Kiev speech. The speech, which was criticised by Ukrainian nationalists and American conservatives, urged Ukrainians not to pursue "suicidal nationalism", a phrase also used by Gorbachev.

However, the process of independence was rapidly accelerated later that month by the 1991 Soviet coup d'état attempt. After a group of Soviet hardliners attempted to overthrow Gorbachev on 19 August, there were widespread protests against the coup attempt in Ukraine. Gorbachev's return to power failed to stop the ensuing chaos, and on 24 August 1991, the Supreme Soviet ratified the Declaration of Independence of Ukraine, written by Chornovil and fellow protest leaders Levko Lukianenko, Mykhailo Horyn, Serhiy Holovatyi, and Ivan Zaiets. The KPU agreed to the declaration of independence at the urging of Kravchuk, with First Secretary Stanislav Hurenko saying that opposing independence would be a "disaster." In an effort to placate anti-independence communist hardliners, pro-independence deputies Volodymyr Yavorivsky and Dmytro Pavlychko put forward the concept of a referendum to confirm the declaration of independence. The flag of the Soviet Union was removed from government buildings and replaced with the flag of Ukraine, an amnesty for all political prisoners was signed, the KPU was suspended and its assets were frozen in connection with the coup attempt. October Revolution Square was renamed to Maidan Nezalezhnosti (lit. 'Independence Square'), while The referendum proposed by Yavorivsky and Pavlychko ultimately occurred, with 92.26% of votes in favour.

== Legacy ==
The 1989–1991 revolution led to the establishment of present-day Ukraine. Sometimes referred to as the "National Liberation Revolution" (Ukrainian: Національно-визвольна революція, romanized: Natsionalno-vyzvolna revoliutsiia) within the country, it led to the establishment of the country's political system. Ultimately, however, Rukh (and the broader democratic nationalist movement) failed to replicate the success it achieved in the revolution. Ukrainian politician Volodymyr Filenko has attributed these later failures to the success of the revolution, saying to Ukrainska Pravda in 2009, "I would attribute this to objective things, namely that we achieved statehood." The Declaration of Independence is celebrated yearly with the Independence Day of Ukraine.

== See also ==
- Collapse: How Ukrainians Destroyed the Evil Empire (2021 documentary miniseries)
- Democracy in Europe
