= Revolution on Granite =

1990 protests in Ukraine, Soviet Union

- Part of the 1989–1991 Ukrainian revolution and the dissolution of the Soviet Union
- Tents on October Revolution Square
- Date: 2 October – 17 October 1990
- Location: Ukrainian SSR, Soviet Union; Primarily Kyiv and Western Ukraine
- Caused by: Dissatisfaction with the results of the March 1990 Ukrainian parliamentary election
- Goals: Resignation of Vitaliy Masol as Chairman of the Council of Ministers of the Ukrainian SSR; Prevention of the New Union Treaty's signing; Multi-party parliamentary elections; Nationalisation of Communist Party property; Prevention of Ukrainian conscripts in the Soviet Army from serving outside Ukraine
- Methods: Hunger strike, occupation, human chain
- Result: Protester victory: Masol forced to resign; Ukrainian Soviet Army conscripts banned from being sent outside Ukraine; New Union Treaty approved by March 1991 referendum, subsequently failed to materialise due to Ukrainian opposition; Independence declared in August 1991, approved by December 1991 referendum; Democratic presidential elections held in December 1991, democratic parliamentary elections held in 1994

Parties
| (Ukraine) Democratic Bloc; People's Movement of Ukraine; Student Society of Lviv; Ukrainian Student Union (Kyiv) | Ukrainian Soviet Socialist Republic; Communist Party of Ukraine |

Lead figures
| Viacheslav Chornovil; Ihor Yukhnovskyi; Oles Donii; Oleh Medunytsia; Viktor Roh; Oleh Tyahnybok | Vitaliy Masol; Leonid Kravchuk |

Number
| 100,000 | |

The Revolution on Granite (Ukrainian: Революція на граніті, romanized: Revoliutsiia na hraniti) was a student-led protest campaign that took place primarily in Kyiv and Western Ukraine in October 1990. Ukraine was then the Ukrainian Soviet Socialist Republic, part of the Soviet Union until its declaration of independence on 24 August 1991. The protest was held from 2 October until 17 October 1990. One of the students' demands was the resignation of the Chairman of the Council of Ministers of the Ukrainian SSR Vitaliy Masol. On the last day of the protests, Masol was forced to resign and was replaced by Vitold Fokin.

The Revolution on Granite is considered the first major political protest of Ukraine centred on Maidan Nezalezhnosti (Independence Square), the others being the 2004 Orange Revolution and the 2013–14 Revolution of Dignity.

== Background ==
Over the course of the year 1989, a peaceful revolution began in Ukraine, aimed at implementing Gorbachev’s programme of perestroika, glasnost and democratisation, plus a number of demands specific to the national-democratic movement, including increased autonomy and self-determination for Ukraine. The formation of the People's Movement of Ukraine (Rukh) was proposed in February 1989, and finally formalised at the founding congress of 8–10 September 1989 as the first non-communist party in Ukraine, in opposition to the ruling Communist Party of Ukraine. The Student Society of Lviv was founded on 25 May 1989, while the Kyiv-based Ukrainian Student Union was launched in August 1989. The student groups, who generally supported Rukh, were deeply disappointed with the results of the March 1990 Ukrainian parliamentary election. In this election the Communist Party of Ukraine had won 331 seats in the Supreme Soviet of the Ukrainian SSR (the parliament of the Ukrainian SSR) and the Democratic Bloc 111 seats. Although an increasing number of people were leaving the Communist Party and forming dozens of progressive-communist factions that wished to cooperate with the national democrats, the conservative communists retained a narrow majority of 239 seats (53%), thus obstructing many legislative reforms demanded by the democratic opposition. At a Rukh conference, student leader Oles Donii declared that the democrats ought to win a majority in the next elections to really change things. The Student Union then began preparations for a large-scale protest, which was to become known as the Revolution on Granite.

Meanwhile in Parliament, a brief consensus emerged when the Declaration of State Sovereignty of Ukraine was adopted almost unanymously on 16 July 1990. But the Group of 239 conservative communists was steering towards approval of the New Union Treaty proposed by Gorbachev. The opposition denounced this as the Soviet empire in disguise, arguing Ukraine needed achieve full independence, as well as protect its domestic market. The Democratic Bloc called for a national strike to be held on 1 October 1990 in front of the Parliament in Kyiv to oppose the New Union Treaty. Reportedly, up to 1 million people from Kyiv, Lviv, Ivano-Frankivsk, and Ternopil participated in the strike, opposing the Treaty, while demanding the Declaration of State Sovereignty to be granted the status of constitutional law, and nationalising Soviet state enterprises, amongst other things.

== Course ==
On the next day, 2 October 1990, the student groups announced a hunger strike and occupied Kyiv's October Revolution Square (now named Maidan Nezalezhnosti, "Independence Square"). They had decided against using the originally intended protest site Mariinskyi Park since that place was filled with Militsiya (the Soviet police force). The day had started with a rally which was attended by 100,000 people and initiated by the People's Movement of Ukraine, the Ukrainian Republican Party, and other smaller patriotic organisations. During the protest, various other marches, whose participants numbered in the tens of thousands, were held in solidarity with the students. Also workers' organisations rallied to the cause by calling for nationwide strikes. During the protest, prominent cultural figures, opposition politicians and Soviet dissidents visited the students to show their support. On one of the first days of protests, chairman of the Supreme Soviet of the Ukrainian SSR Leonid Kravchuk visited the protestors.

The protesters wanted to prevent the signing of the New Union Treaty, a new multi-party parliamentary election held before or in the spring of 1991, military service for Ukrainian (in the Soviet Armed Forces) to be fulfilled only in the Ukrainian Soviet Socialist Republic, the property of the Communist Party of Ukraine and Komsomol nationalised and the resignation of the Chairman of the Council of Ministers of the Ukrainian SSR, Vitaliy Masol. The demand to not sign the proposed New Union Treaty, which would transform the Soviet Union into the Union of Soviet Sovereign Republics, was part of the then resurgence of Ukrainian nationalism which eventually led to Ukraine's 1991 declaration of independence.

On the first day of the protest, only a few dozen students from Kyiv, Lviv, Dneprodzerzhinsk (now Kamianske), Ivano-Frankivsk, and several other cities gathered at the square. In a few days, there were several hundreds of them, along with around tens of thousands of Ukrainians who supported them. The students set up shelter-half tents on the square. The protest acquired its name from the setup of the tents on the granite of the square. Of all protesters, about 200 were on hunger strike (all of them survived their action). Eventually another camp was set up in front of the Supreme Soviet of the Ukrainian SSR. During the protest and because deputies had sided with the students, student Oles Doniy from the T. H. Shevchenko Kyiv State University (now Taras Shevchenko National University of Kyiv) stated the students' demands in a speech to the Verkhovna Rada (Ukraine's parliament).

On 17 October 1990, Masol was forced to resign and was replaced by Vitold Fokin. The four other student demands were not initially met. But soon military conscription was to be limited to the territory of Ukraine; the planned New Union Treaty was not to be taken into consideration and multi-party elections were set to be held in the 1994 Ukrainian parliamentary election.

== Legacy ==
Various Revolution on Granite organizers later became leading figures in organising the 2004 Orange Revolution. Mykhaylo Svystovych and Vyacheslav Kyrylenko started their political career with taking part in the Revolution on Granite.

The Revolution on Granite is viewed as the first major political protest centred on Maidan Nezalezhnosti, the others being the 2004 Orange Revolution, and the 2013–14 Euromaidan. These protest largely mimicked the style of protest of the Revolution on Granite: occupation of a large square and building a stage there where artists would perform.

In May 2024 a monument to one of the leaders of the leaders of the protest campaign Markiian Ivashchyshyn was opened in Lviv.

== Bibliography ==
- Siruk, Mykola (30 September 2015). "Революції на граніті – 25. Чи засвоєно уроки?" [The Revolution on Granite was 25 years ago. Have the lessons been learnt?]. The Day (Kyiv) (in Ukrainian). Archived from the original on 1 May 2026.
- Torba, Valentyn (4 October 2016). "The lesson of the Revolution on Granite". The Day (Kyiv). Archived from the original on 23 January 2022.
