= Ukrainian Revolution =

Ukrainian Revolution may refer to:

- Khmelnytsky Uprising (1648–1657)
- Ukraine after the Russian Revolution (1917–1920)
- Ukrainian War of Independence (1917–1921)
  - Ukrainian–Soviet War (1917–1921)
  - Polish–Ukrainian War (1918–1919)
- 1989–1991 Ukrainian revolution
  - Revolution on Granite (1990)
  - Declaration of Independence of Ukraine (1991)
- Orange Revolution (2004–2005)
- Euromaidan (2013–2014)
  - Revolution of Dignity (2014)
