= Yurii Tymoshenko =

Ukrainian activist, soldier, and politician

- Юрій Тимошенко
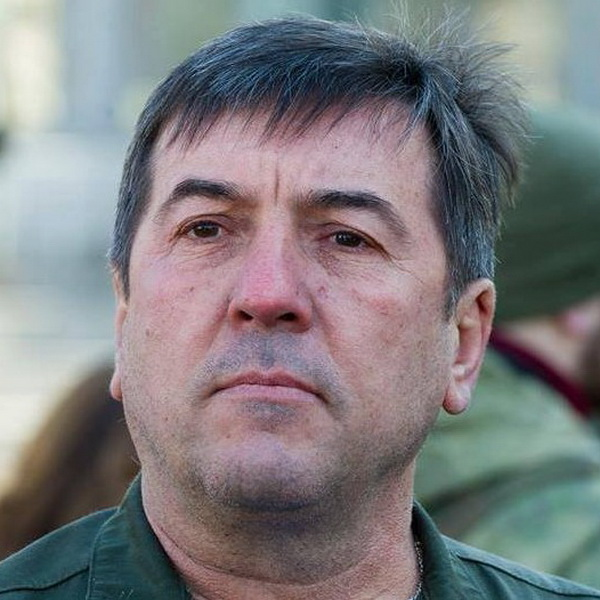
- Tymoshenko in 2015

People's Deputy of Ukraine
- In office 27 November 2014 – 29 August 2019
- Preceded by: Oles Donii
- Succeeded by: Andriy Ivanchuk
- Constituency: Ivano-Frankivsk Oblast, No. 88

Personal details
- Born: 3 April 1961 (age 65) Divnoye, Stavropol Krai, Russian SFSR, Soviet Union (now Russia)
- Party: People's Front
- Other political affiliations: Independent

Military service
- Allegiance: Ukraine
- Branch/service: National Guard of Ukraine
- Years of service: 2014–2019
- Unit: General Kulchytskyi First Operative Battalion
- Battles/wars: Russo-Ukrainian War; War in Donbas

Yurii Volodymyrovych Tymoshenko (Ukrainian: Ю́рій Володи́мирович Тимоше́нко; born 3 April 1961) is a Ukrainian activist, soldier, and politician who served as a People's Deputy of Ukraine from 2014 to 2019, representing Ukraine's 88th electoral district in Ivano-Frankivsk Oblast. Prior to his election, he was a soldier in the National Guard of Ukraine.

== Early life and career ==
Yurii Tymoshenko was born on 3 April 1961 in the village of Divnoye, Stavropol Krai, in the Russian Soviet Federative Socialist Republic of the Soviet Union. He graduated from Ivano-Frankivsk Cooperative Professional and Technical School with a specialisation in sales consulting. From 1982 to 1983 he was a delivery driver for a Kolomyia-based catering service, before working at the Central Directorate of Trade in the Ministry of Defence of the Soviet Union from 1983 to 1985. Over the next four years, he was employed at multiple kolkhozes.

Tymoshenko was a supporter of the 1989–1991 Ukrainian revolution. He was part of the Ukrainian Helsinki Union and the Memorial society. He was also a member of the All-Ukrainian OUN-UPA Brotherhood. Following the revolution, he became a painter at the Budivelnyk cooperative, where he worked until 1993. He was a delivery driver for the Ukrainian Publishing Union from 2006 to 2013.

Tymoshenko became a member of the Kolomyishchyna Self-Defence following Euromaidan. He joined the National Guard of Ukraine in May 2014 and fought in the War in Donbas.

== Political career ==
Tymoshenko was the People's Front candidate in Ukraine's 88th electoral district, located in and around Kolomyia, during the 2014 Ukrainian parliamentary election. He was successfully elected with 29.32% of the vote, defeating incumbent independent People's Deputy of Ukraine Oles Donii. In the Verkhovna Rada, Tymoshenko was a member of the Committee on Prevention and Counteraction of Corruption.

=== 2019 presidential campaign ===
Tymoshenko was registered as a candidate in the 2019 Ukrainian presidential election on 6 February 2019. Although his bid was considered a long shot by pollsters according to Euronews, Tymoshenko's candidacy acquired attention as he had the same surname and initials as Yulia Tymoshenko, leader of the Batkivshchyna party and a leading candidate in the election. The latter Tymoshenko's campaign accused the former of being a "clone" candidate, with the intention of confusing voters and stealing votes from her in an effort to prevent her from winning the election. Yurii Tymoshenko disputed the allegations, noting that he had declared his intention to run for president in a 2017 Facebook post and claiming that he had always wanted to be president. He denied questions by the BBC as to whether or not he had been given money to run, stating that he had taken out a loan for the bank and spent his family's earnings on it.

Tymoshenko was removed from the People's Front parliamentary faction on 17 January 2019, after announcing his decision to run. He was additionally targeted by two individuals who attempted to bribe him with ₴5 million in return for the withdrawal of his candidacy. They were subsequently arrested. Yurii Tymoshenko was eliminated in the first round of the election, gathering 117,693 votes. Yulia Tymoshenko was also eliminated with 2,532,452, three percent behind incumbent President Petro Poroshenko.
