= Oles Donii =

Ukrainian activist and politician

- Олесь Доній
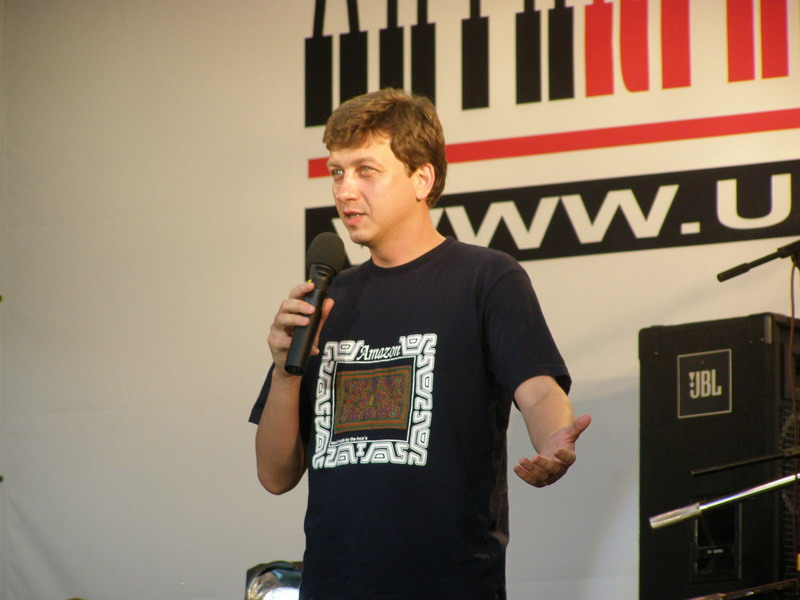
- Donii in 2007

People's Deputy of Ukraine
- In office 23 November 2007 – 27 November 2014
- Preceded by: Constituency established
- Succeeded by: Yurii Tymoshenko (2014)
- Constituency: NUNS, No. 37 (2007–2012); Ivano-Frankivsk Oblast, No. 88 (2012–2014)

Personal details
- Born: Oleksandr Serhiiovych Donii; 13 August 1969 (age 57) Kyiv, Ukrainian SSR, Soviet Union (now Ukraine)
- Party: Independent
- Other political affiliations: People's Movement of Ukraine (1990–1991); Socialist Party of Ukraine; Civil Movement "People's Self-Defense"; Our Ukraine–People's Self-Defense Bloc
- Education: Taras Shevchenko National University of Kyiv

Oleksandr Serhiiovych Donii (Ukrainian: Олекса́ндр Сергі́йович Доні́й; born 18 August 1969) is a Ukrainian activist and politician who served as a People's Deputy of Ukraine from 2007 to 2014, first on the proportional representation list of Our Ukraine–People's Self-Defense Bloc and later from Ukraine's 88th electoral district in Ivano-Frankivsk Oblast. Prior to his election, Donii was one of the leaders of the 1990 Revolution on Granite that called for free and fair elections in the Ukrainian Soviet Socialist Republic.

== Early life and Revolution on Granite ==
Oleksandr Serhiiovych Donii was born on 18 August 1969, in the Ukrainian capital of Kyiv. He first acquired a sense of Ukrainian identity in school, and he later recounted that he hoped to learn Ukrainian while in university. While he was a student at Taras Shevchenko National University of Kyiv in the late 1980s, Donii began organising students in support of Ukrainian Soviet dissidents and the 1989–1991 Ukrainian revolution.

Following the 1990 Ukrainian Supreme Soviet election, Donii was the leader of a series of protests seeking the resignation of Vitaliy Masol. Known as the Revolution on Granite, the protests achieved broad support from Ukrainian society, including dissident leader Viacheslav Chornovil and Leonid Kravchuk, the leader of Ukraine's communists. As the head of the protests' Central Ukrainian branch, Donii was one of three formal leaders of the revolution, alongside Markiian Ivashchyshyn (Western Ukraine, based in Lviv) and Oleh Barkov (Eastern Ukraine, based in Dniprodzerzhinsk). Donii was appointed deputy chairman of the People's Movement of Ukraine in 1990, a role he held until 1991. He was also co-leader of the Ukrainian Student Union from 1991 to 1992, and served as head of the Centre for Extreme Politics from 1992 to 1994.

== Political career ==
Donii was elected to the Kyiv City Council in 1994. He was deputy head of the council's Committee on Humanitarian Issues. Taking an interest in cultural issues, Donii was leader of the Young Ukraine movement, as well as Last Barricade, a movement promoting urban culture. He participated in the 2004 Orange Revolution, and by 2005 was head of the electoral committee of the Socialist Party of Ukraine in the western Lviv Oblast. Donii mulled a campaign for the Lviv Oblast Council, but ultimately decided to become a candidate for People's Deputy of Ukraine from the proportional representation list of the SPU. He was placed 99th on the party's list during the 2006 Ukrainian parliamentary election.

During the election campaign, Donii pledged to reform the SPU into a "patriotic centre-left structure", and he credited the 2004 Ukrainian presidential election, during which the SPU had gathered a greater portion of the vote than the Communist Party of Ukraine for the first time in their history, as placing the party as leaders of the Ukrainian left. He was ultimately not elected, as the SPU won only 33 seats, and returned to work as a political scientist. Following the 2006 Ukrainian political crisis, in which SPU leader Oleksandr Moroz formed an alliance with the Party of Regions, Donii critically compared him to Ivan the Fool.

=== People's Deputy of Ukraine ===
Donii was again a candidate in the 2007 Ukrainian parliamentary election, this time from the Our Ukraine–People's Self-Defense Bloc (NUNS). During the campaign, Donii continued to profess his support for a left-wing Ukrainian nationalist party. He was successfully elected as part of the Civil Movement "People's Self-Defense", which was a member of NUNS, though he was an independent at the time. He was head of the Verkhovna Rada subcommittee on humanitarian education, science, and information.

Donii expressed support for the establishment of NUNS as an ideological party, rather than one based around the personal appeal of President Viktor Yushchenko. He called for members of the bloc who were ideologically close to the Party of Regions to be expelled, and additionally criticised the government for favouring Ivan Plyushch as the bloc's candidate for Chairman of the Verkhovna Rada rather than Vyacheslav Kyrylenko.

Donii was re-elected as a People's Deputy during the 2012 Ukrainian parliamentary election. He was elected in Ukraine's 88th electoral district (located in and around Kolomyia, Ivano-Frankivsk Oblast) as an independent candidate with 43.95% of the vote, defeating six other candidates. He partook in Euromaidan and described himself as affiliated with more radical activists who were suspicious of Petro Poroshenko, saying "people died [during Euromaidan] so that Roshen could open a new store".

==== Kharkiv Pact beating ====
During a vote on the 2010 Kharkiv Pact in the Verkhovna Rada, a significant fight broke out between deputies of NUNS and the Party of Regions. During the fight, Donii was beaten by six Party of Regions deputies. He was hospitalised following the beating, and he demanded that NUNS file a lawsuit against the Party of Regions for assault. NUNS ultimately did not file a lawsuit, something Donii credited in 2021 to a lack of willpower on the bloc's behalf to actually fight the Party of Regions.

=== Post-People's Deputy career ===
During the 2014 Ukrainian parliamentary election Donii again ran in the 88th electoral district, but he was defeated by People's Front candidate Yurii Tymoshenko, who won 29.32% of the vote compared to Donii's 16.00%.

In 2024 Donii criticised President Volodymyr Zelenskyy for having denied that Russia was planning to invade Ukraine, and additionally claimed that Western nations were preparing to surrender Ukrainian territory to Russia, basing his argument on the evacuation of embassies from Kyiv.
