= Andriy Ivanchuk =

Ukrainian politician (1973–2023)

- Андрій Іванчук
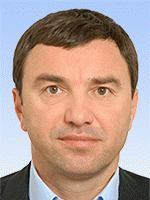
- Official portrait, 2019

People's Deputy of Ukraine
- In office 12 December 2012 – 23 September 2023
- Preceded by: Yurii Tymoshenko (2019)
- Constituency: Batkivshchyna, No. 41 (2012–2014); People's Front, No. 16 (2014–2019); Ivano-Frankivsk Oblast, No. 88 (2019–2023)

Personal details
- Born: 16 June 1973 Ivano-Frankivsk, Ukrainian SSR, Soviet Union (now Ukraine)
- Died: 25 September 2023 (aged 50) Ukraine
- Party: Batkivshchyna
- Other political affiliations: Front for Change (until 2013); People's Front; Dovira
- Education: Chernivtsi University

Andriy Volodymyrovych Ivanchuk (Ukrainian: Андрій Володимирович Іванчук; 16 June 1973 – 25 September 2023) was a Ukrainian politician who served as a People's Deputy of Ukraine from 2012 until his death in 2023. Originally elected from the proportional representation list of Batkivshchyna, he was re-elected on the People's Front, finally serving from Ukraine's 88th electoral district in Ivano-Frankivsk Oblast from 2019 until his death. He was the Chairman of the Verkhovna Rada Committee on Economic Policy.

== Biography ==
In 1991, after graduating from Vasyl Stefanyk high school (now lyceum) in the city of Kolomyia, Ivanchuk enrolled in Chernivtsi University to the Faculty of Law. He graduated in 1996 with a degree in law.

From 12 December 2012 to 27 November 2014 he served as a People's Deputy of Ukraine of the 7th Ukrainian Verkhovna Rada as the 41st candidate on the proportional list of Batkivshchyna. He was Deputy Chairman of the Faction and Chairman of the Verkhovna Rada Committee on Economic Policy.

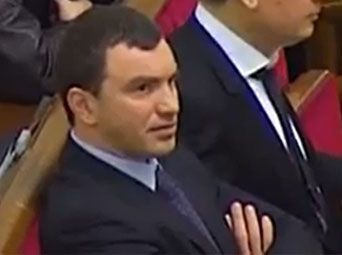
Ivanchuk in 2013

Ivanchuk was a member of the Front for Change party, a member of the party's Council and Bureau, and from September 2009 to June 2010 he was acting chairman of the party. He also held the position of Deputy Chairman of the Council of the public organization and chairman of the executive committee of Front for Change. On 15 June 2013, after the unification of the Front for Change and Batkivshchyna, he was elected one of the deputy leaders of the latter party.

Ivanchuk died of thrombosis on 25 September 2023, at the age of 50.

== See also ==
- List of members of the Verkhovna Rada of Ukraine who died in office
