= 500th anniversary of the Zaporozhian Cossacks =

1990 celebrations in Ukraine

- Part of dissolution of the Soviet Union
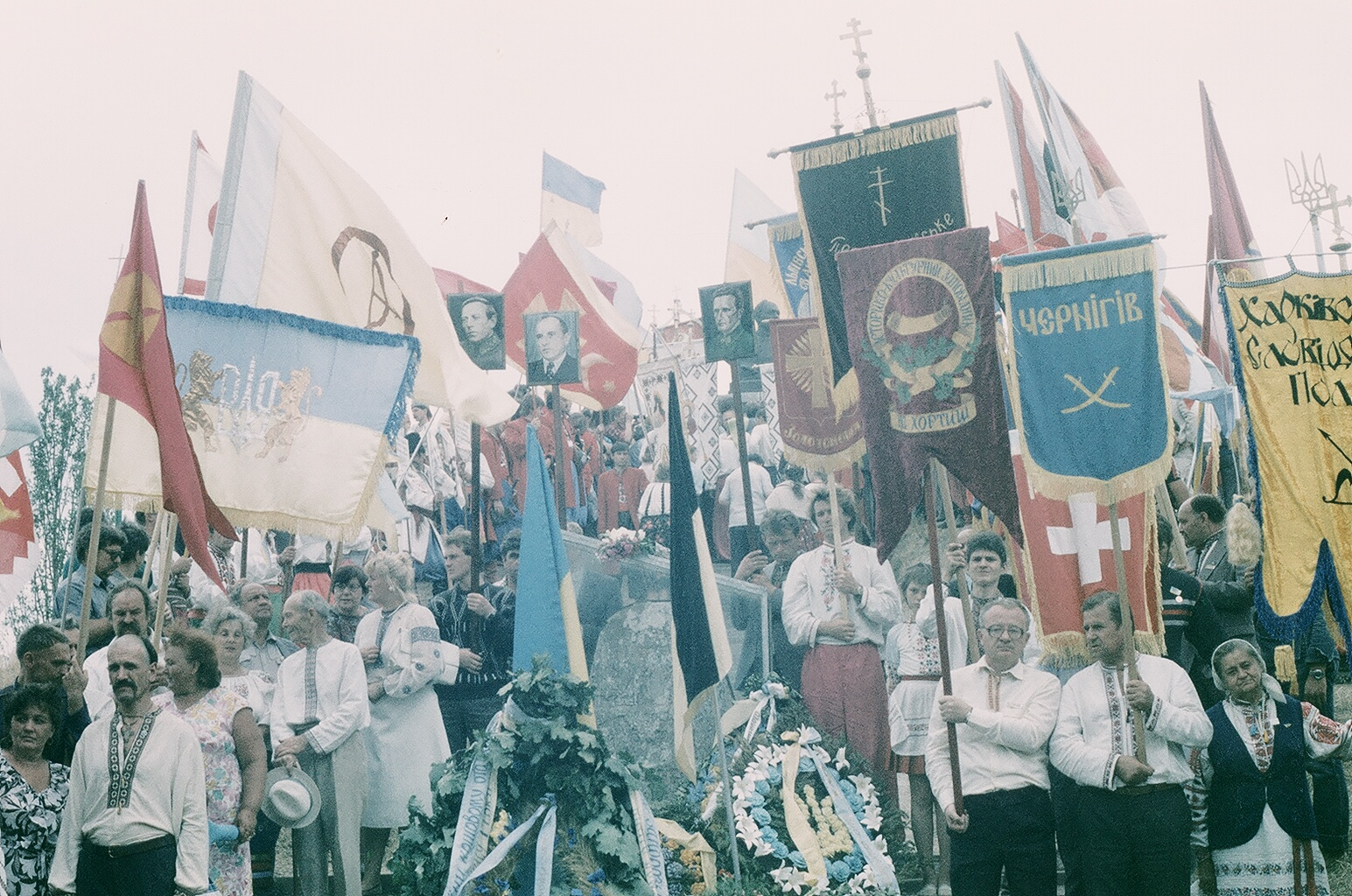
- Native name: 500-ліття Запорозького козацтва
- Date: 1–5 August 1990
- Location: Dnipropetrovsk and Zaporizhzhia Oblasts, Ukrainian SSR, Soviet Union (primarily Dnipropetrovsk, Khortytsia, Nikopol, and Zaporizhzhia)
- Theme: Ukrainian nationalism
- Organized by: Taras Shevchenko Society for the Ukrainian Language; People's Movement of Ukraine; (Ivan Drach, Mykhailo Horyn, Ivan Plyushch, Dmytro Pavlychko)
- Participants: 300,000–500,000

The 500th anniversary of the Zaporozhian Cossacks (Ukrainian: 500-ліття Запорозького козацтва, romanized: 500-littia Zaporozkoho kozatstva) was a group of celebrations organised by the Taras Shevchenko Society for the Ukrainian Language and People's Movement of Ukraine and held in August 1990 to commemorate the 500th anniversary of the founding of the Zaporozhian Cossacks. The events, which were primarily organised by Ukrainian Sixtier poet Dmytro Pavlychko as well as other dissidents, took place in the southern Dnipropetrovsk and Zaporizhzhia Oblasts, and served as a form of demonstrating Ukrainian nationalism and support for Ukrainian independence from the Soviet Union.

== Background ==
By 1990, assertions of Ukraine's separateness from Russia had become more overt. The dissident movement had formed into several organisations dedicated to strengthening Ukrainian culture (such as the Taras Shevchenko Society for the Ukrainian Language) and increasing Ukrainian independence from the Soviet Union (such as the People's Movement of Ukraine). At the same time, the Soviet Union was beginning to collapse; the Baltic states and Georgia had declared independence. The Declaration of State Sovereignty of Ukraine, adopted on 16 July 1990, gave the Ukrainian Soviet Socialist Republic newfound separateness from the central Soviet government.

In 1990, the dissident movement was seeking something that could bring opponents of the Soviet Ukrainian government together. Seeing an opportunity to act without rejection from the government, they expressed their desire to organise events celebrating the 500th anniversary of the founding of the Zaporozhian Cossacks, a proposal which was accepted by the government.

== Events ==
Though official celebrations began on 3 August 1990, informal activities had already begun three days prior. Celebrations on that day commemorated Ukrainian historian Dmytro Yavornytsky, who had studied the Zaporozhian Cossacks. This was followed the next day by a convocation of Cossacks from throughout Ukraine (including the Crimean Autonomous Soviet Socialist Republic). Official events on 3 and 4 August 1990 included a scientific conference dedicated to the history of the Zaporozhian Cossacks, commemorations of Cossack leader Ivan Sirko, and the placing of a memorial at Sirko's tomb.

In addition to dissident forces, other groups were involved in organising celebrations. Dissidents from the Baltic states played a role in organising awareness and support for the anniversary. Members of the Soviet government also gave their approval to the anniversary, with soldiers of the Soviet Army in one instance helping to install the flag of the Ukrainian Insurgent Army onto a monument and in other instances installing toilets and kitchens for participants in celebrations.

=== March in Zaporizhzhia ===
The largest and most significant part of the anniversary's celebration took place on 5 August 1990. Beginning on the island of Khortytsia, a march began travelling across the Dnipro Hydroelectric Station and into the city itself. An estimated 300,000 to 500,000 people took place in the march, including priests and Soviet dissidents. Other occasions which brought people to support the march were preservation of the Ukrainian language and environmentalism.

Zaporizhzhia March, 5 August 1990
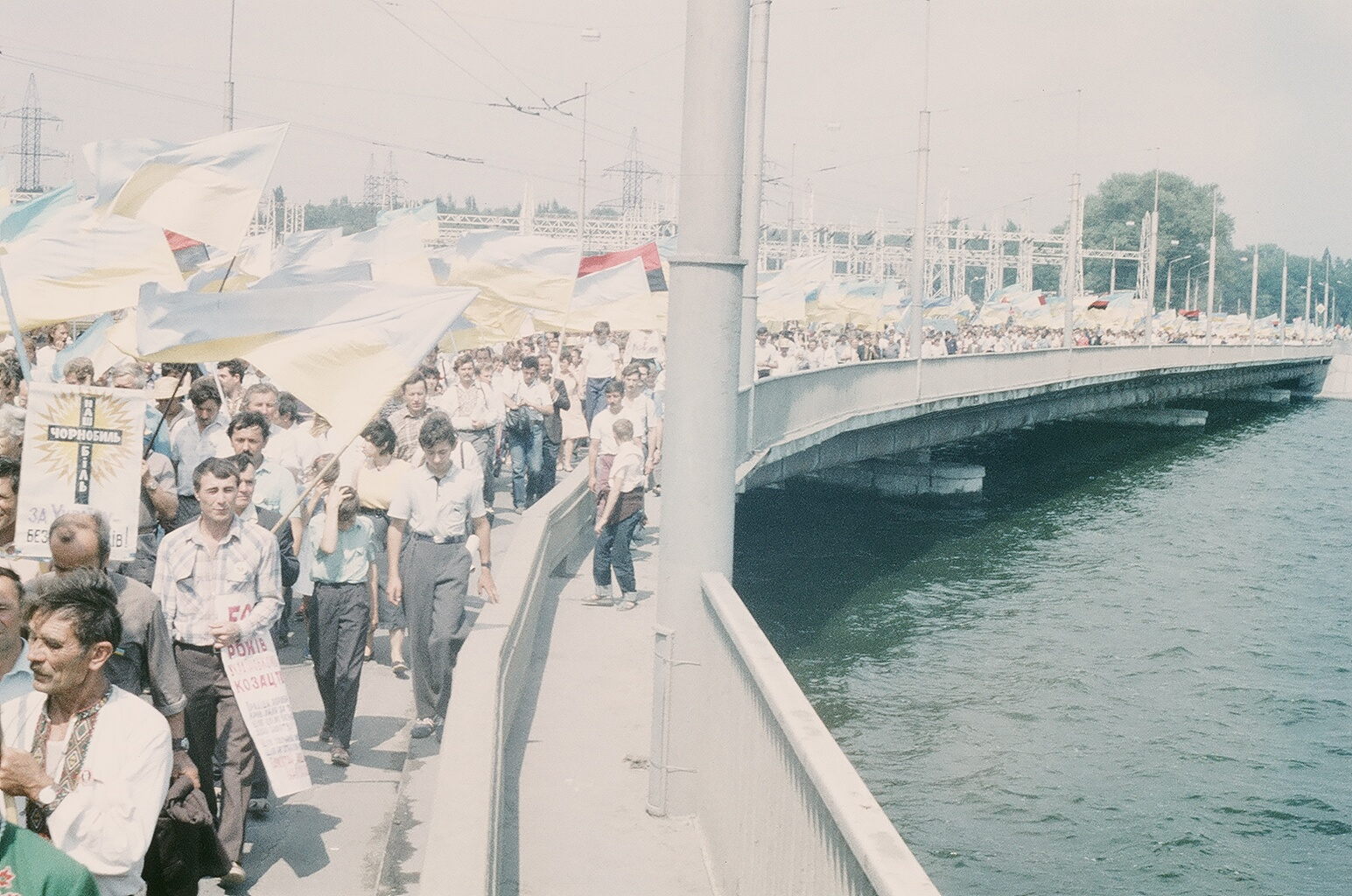
March participants passing over the Dnieper Hydroelectric Station

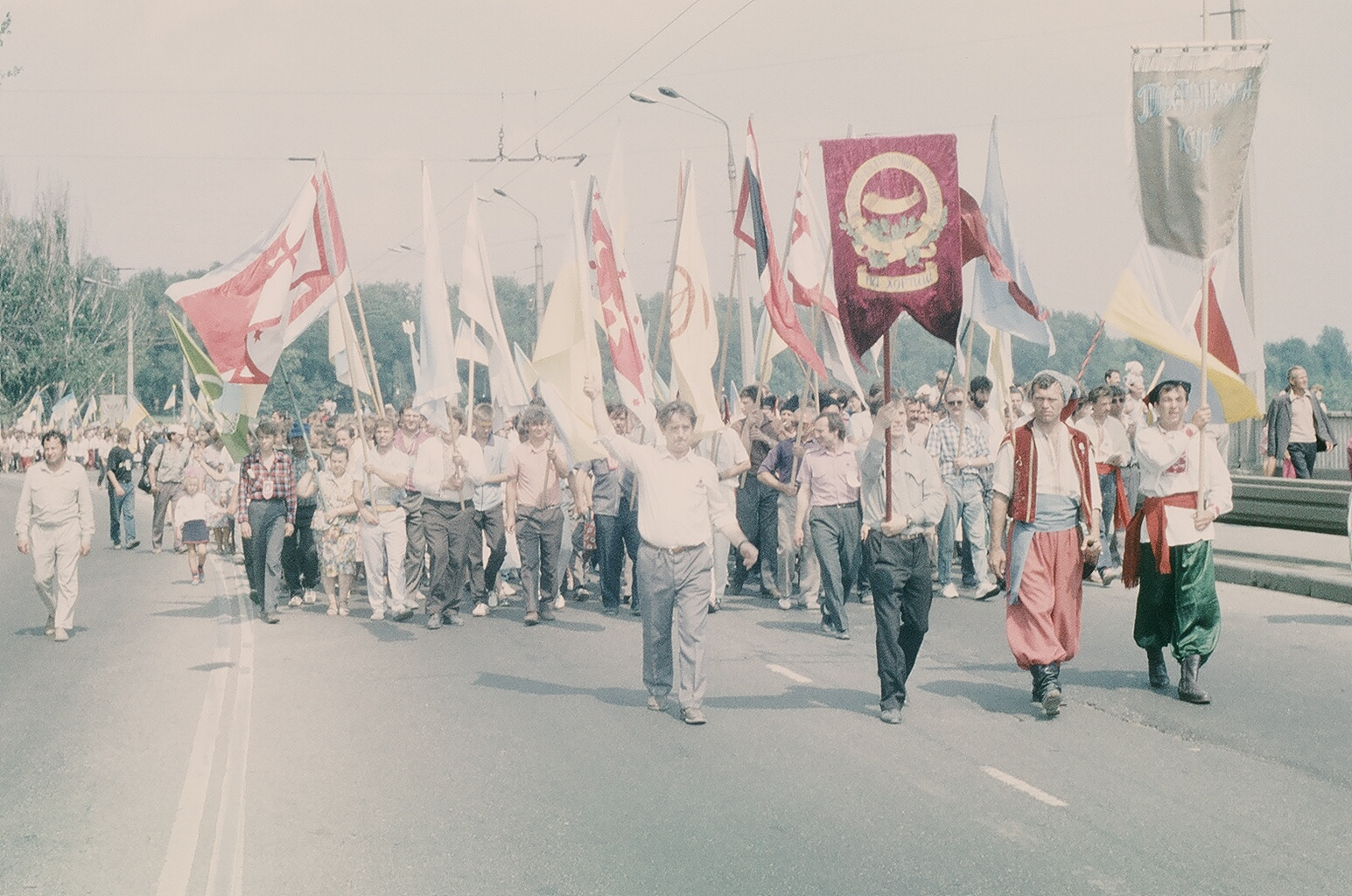
Flags of various Cossack groups (along with the flag of Ukraine and the Belarusian white-red-white flag) being waved by marchers

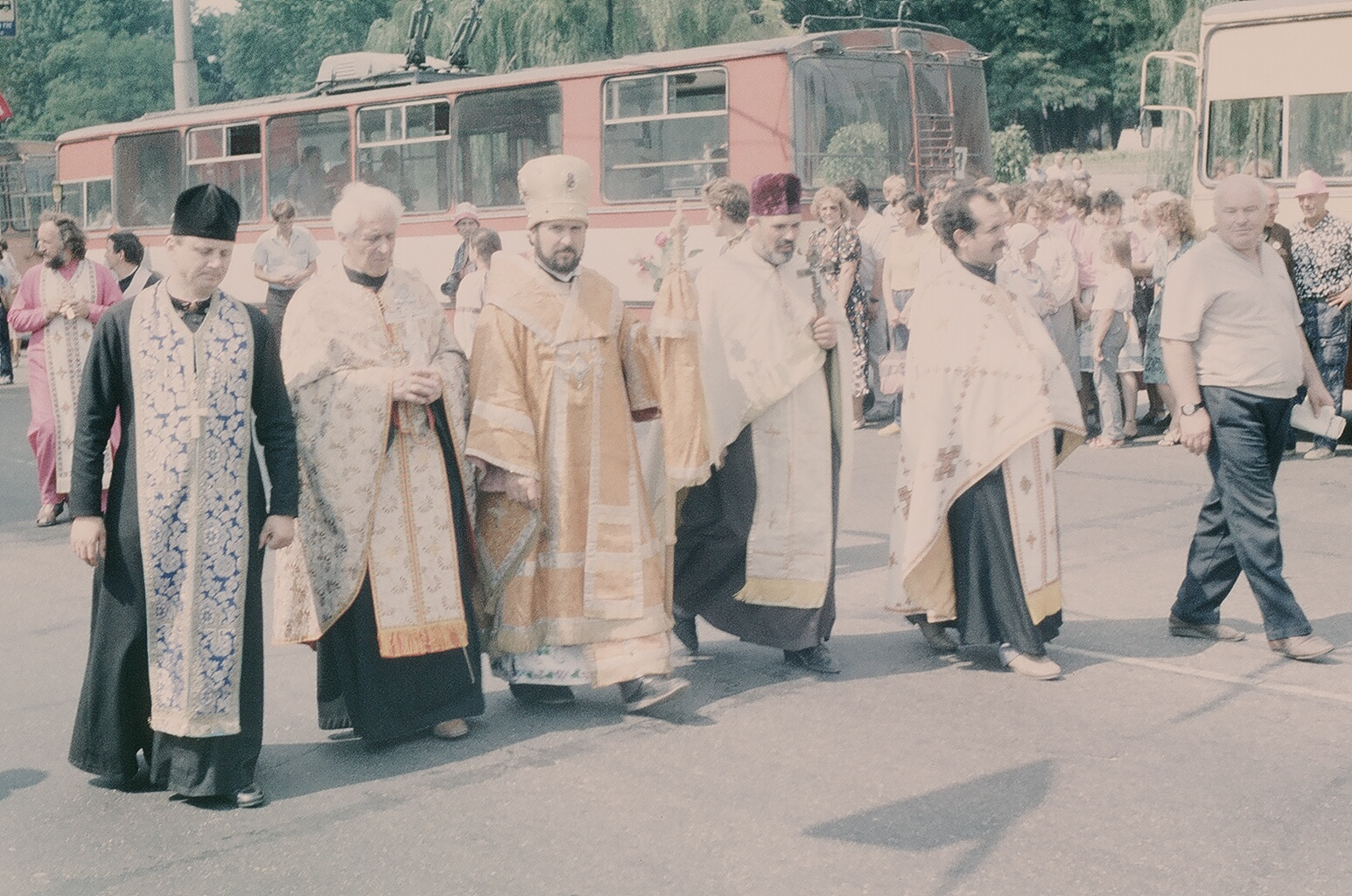
Eastern Orthodox clergy participating in the march

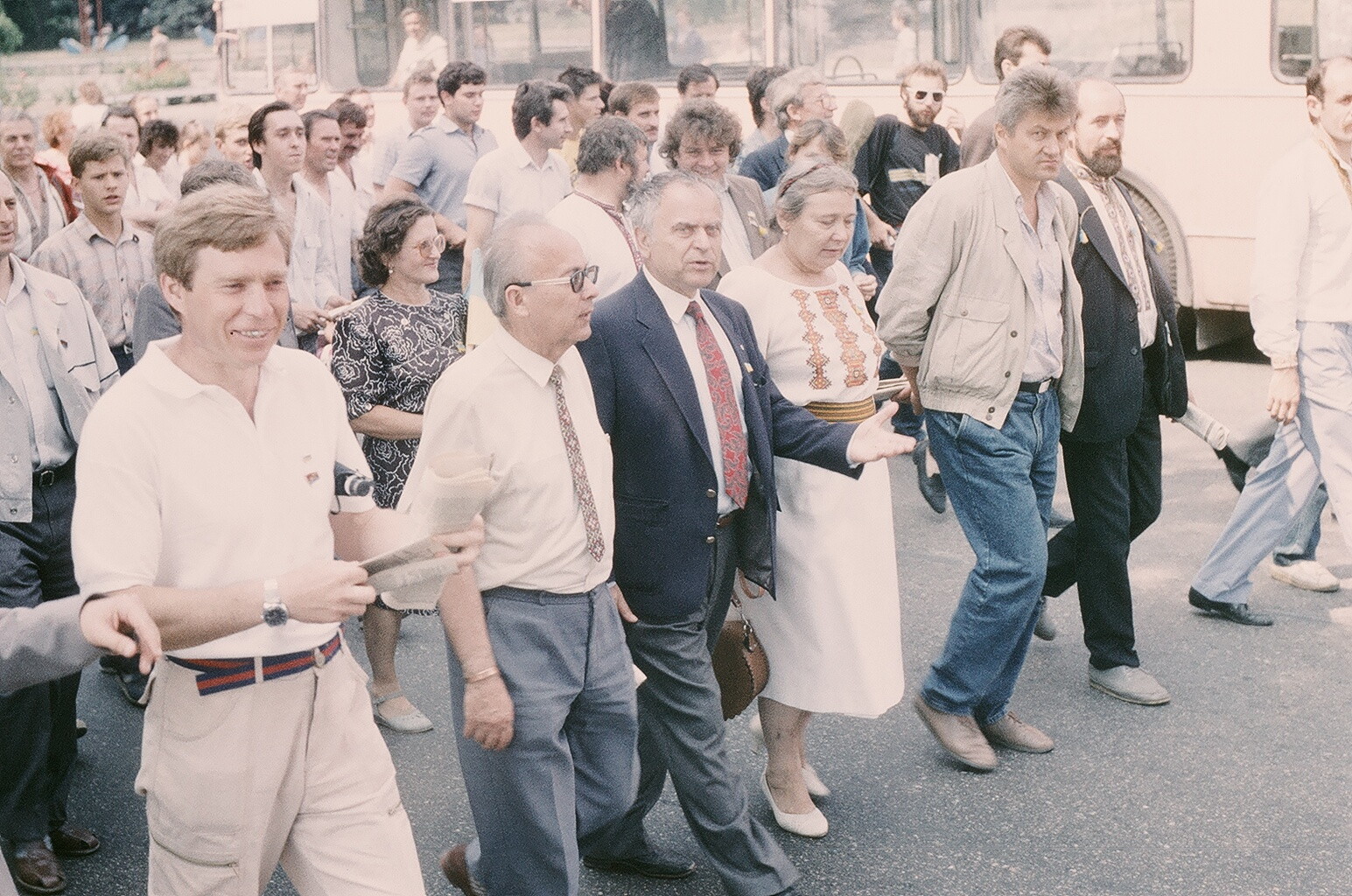
Celebration organiser Dmytro Pavlychko (in centre, facing camera) marching alongside other participants

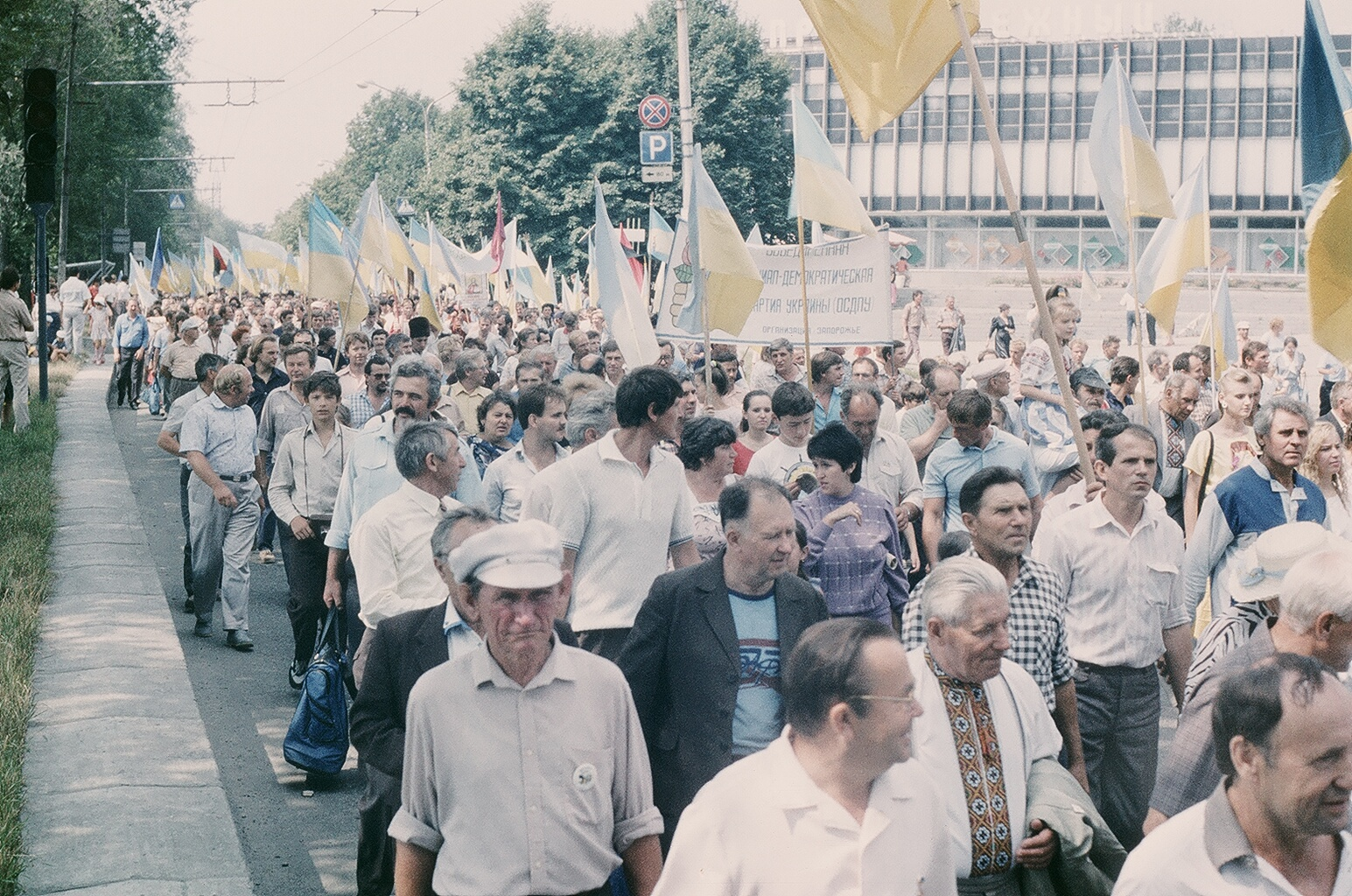
The march processing through the city of Zaporizhzhia

== Legacy ==
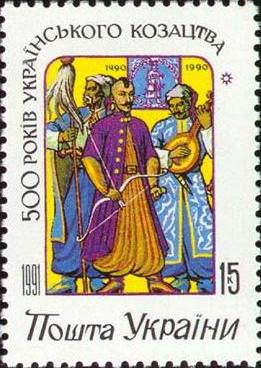
A 1991 stamp of Ukraine commemorating the 500th anniversary of Ukrainian Cossacks

The events of the anniversary led to a renewed interest in the history of Ukrainian Cossacks. Since the anniversary, Ukraine's Cossack heritage has turned from a matter of debate among historians to something which is commonly accepted. A number of Cossack societies have been founded in Ukraine since independence in 1991, owing partially to an atmosphere which was favourable to Cossacks brought about by the anniversary. The commemorations also led to the protection of Khortytsia's natural environment, with the island being granted the status of a national nature reserve in 1993.

Attempts at furthering the status of Cossacks within Ukrainian society after independence continued, though they failed to make significant progress. Proposals to integrate Cossacks into the Armed Forces of Ukraine during the presidencies of Leonid Kuchma and Viktor Yushchenko failed to come to fruition, and Cossacks fell into internal divisions between Russophile and anti-Russian Cossacks until the founding of the Kyiv Cossack Regiment in 2014 as part of the Russo-Ukrainian War.
