= New Union Treaty =

Proposed treaty on the reformation of the Soviet Union in 1991

Involvement of the Soviet republics in the New Union Treaty. Supported the confederation (both before and after the August coup). Supported the confederation, but moved towards independence after the August coup. Boycotted the confederation, demanding full independence.

The New Union Treaty (Russian: Новый союзный договор, romanized: Novyy soyuznyy dogovor) was a 1990 draft treaty that would have replaced the 1922 Treaty on the Creation of the Union of Soviet Socialist Republics (USSR) to salvage and reform the USSR.

The preparation of this treaty was known as the Novo-Ogaryovo process, named after Novo-Ogaryovo, a governmental estate where the work on the document was carried out and where Soviet President and CPSU General Secretary Mikhail Gorbachev talked with leaders of Union republics.

A ceremony of the Russian SFSR signing the treaty was scheduled for 20 August 1991, but was prevented by the August Coup. In its aftermath, the Soviet Union ultimately dissolved by December of the same year, and the Commonwealth of Independent States was set up in its place.

== History ==
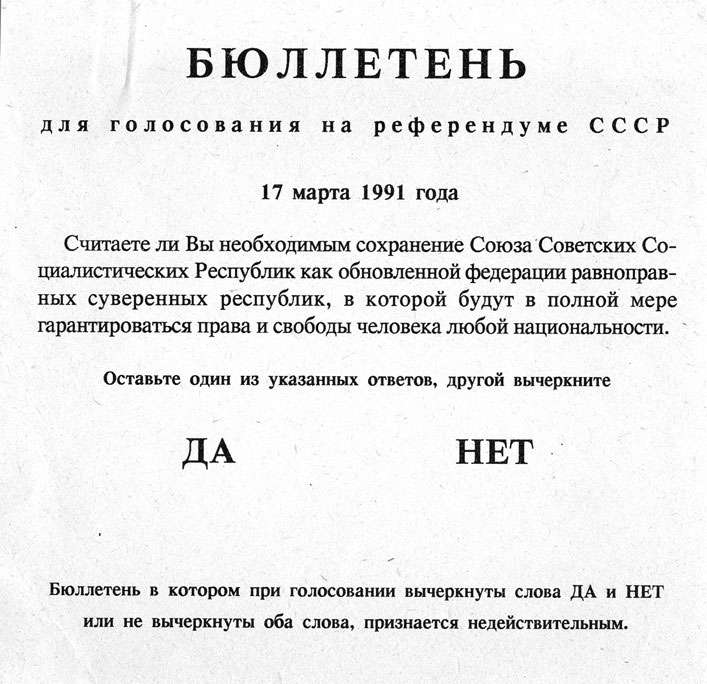
Ballot paper of the referendum of 17 March 1991

A less centralized federal system was proposed by Gorbachev during the Communist Party Congress of July 1990. A draft of the New Union Treaty was submitted to the Supreme Soviet of the Soviet Union on 23 November 1990. A drafting committee started work on the text on 1 January 1991. Six of the fifteen Soviet republics, however, did not participate in the drafting of the treaty: Armenia, Georgia, Moldova, Estonia, Latvia and Lithuania. The proposal was approved by the Soviet of the Union on 6 March and sent to the Supreme Soviets of each republic for approval.

Agreement could not be reached on the distribution of power between the Union and the Republics and the proposal was not approved. Gorbachev tried to gain popular support for the proposal. On 17 March 1991, the nine republics (Russia, Byelorussia, Ukraine, Azerbaijan, Kazakhstan, Kyrgyzstan, Tajikistan, Turkmenistan, and Uzbekistan) which participated in the drafting of the treaty held a popular referendum. 76% of voters supported maintaining the federal system of the Soviet Union, including a majority in all of the nine republics. Opposition was greatest in large cities like Leningrad and Moscow. As the other six republics were already moving towards independence, citizens mostly boycotted the referendum. An agreement between the Soviet central government and the nine republics, known as the 9 + 1 agreement, was finally signed in Novo-Ogaryovo on 23 April. The New Union Treaty would have converted the Soviet Union into a confederation of independent republics with a common president, foreign policy, and military.

By August, eight of the nine republics, except Ukraine, had approved the draft of the new Treaty with some conditions. Ukraine did not agree on the terms of the Treaty. In the simultaneous Ukrainian republican referendum on 17 March, the majority of residents of Ukraine supported joining the Union on the basis of the 16 July 1990 Declaration of State Sovereignty of Ukraine.

In addition, most of autonomous republics expressed the desire to raise their status and to be a party to the new Soviet treaty and declared sovereignty and self-promotion to republics during the parade of sovereignties in the months following the initial proposal from July 1990. Most of them participated in the Novo-Ogaryovo process to draft the treaty, and the status of former autonomous republics was a major point of contention among participants. On July 12, 1991, the Supreme Soviet passed the resolution "About the draft treaty on Union of Sovereign States" to state its stance on the matter that each of "the subjects of the federation, including both the sovereign states - the republics - and the republics incorporated within them on a treaty or constitutional basis" "possesses the right to sign the text of the Union Treaty". As a compromise, the final draft of the treaty allowed a state to join the Union as a part of another state, but only the nine republics were invited to sign it at Novo-Ogaryovo on July 23.

Following the August coup, the New Union Treaty was further reformed into the Commonwealth of Independent States.

== Republics by participation ==
=== Involved ===
In addition to the nine republics that reached the 9 + 1 agreement, leaders of eighteen of the twenty autonomous republics as defined in the 1977 Constitution (all except Adjara and Nakhchivan) and the Crimean ASSR reconstituted by the Ukrainian SSR in the same year participated in the drafting of the treaty.

==== Republics ====
- Russian SFSR
- Byelorussian SSR
- Ukrainian SSR
- Republic of Azerbaijan (former Azerbaijan SSR)
- Kazakh SSR
- Republic of Kyrgyzstan (former Kirghiz SSR)
- Tajik SSR
- Turkmen SSR
- Uzbek SSR

==== Autonomous republics ====
- All sixteen republics under the Russian SFSR
- Crimean ASSR under Ukraine
- Karakalpak ASSR under Uzbekistan
- Abkhaz SSR (former ASSR under Georgia, which had declared independence)

=== Uninvolved ===
The following republics boycotted the March 1991 referendum and were subsequently not involved in the drafting of the New Union Treaty:

- Republic of Armenia (former Armenian SSR)
- Republic of Georgia (former Georgian SSR)
- Republic of Moldova (former Moldavian SSR)
- Republic of Estonia (former Estonian SSR)
- Republic of Latvia (former Latvian SSR)
- Republic of Lithuania (former Lithuanian SSR)

== Names of the proposed state ==
In the August 1991 draft of the treaty, the proclaimed name for the new country was the Union of Soviet Sovereign Republics (Russian: Союз Советских Суверенных Республик, romanized: Soyuz Sovetskikh Suverennykh Respublik). This would conserve the Russian "СССР" acronym, meaning "USSR" and "Soviet Union" in English and other languages. By September 1991, support for continuing the Soviet system had transitioned into reforming the Soviet Union into a confederation of sovereign states. The final draft renamed the proposed state as the Union of Sovereign States (Russian: Союз Суверенных Государств, romanized: Soyuz Suverennykh Gosudarstv).

== Key points of the Treaty ==
With the new Treaty of the Union Gorbachev sought to keep the Union from splitting apart arguing that its dismantling would end only in bloodshed. The text of the Treaty contains an introduction of basic principles followed by 26 Articles:

- Union of Sovereign States: The treaty proposed to set up a Union of Sovereign and Equal States based on democracy and rule-of-law as successor to the Union of Soviet Socialist Republics. This new polity was envisioned as a voluntary association of sovereign republics with a common federal government. A member joins the Union either directly or as a part of other states, and relations between members when one of them is a part of another are regulated by treaties between them.
- Presidential Council: The treaty proposed the creation of a Presidential Council that would consist of the leaders of the republics and the president of the Union. This council would be responsible for making important decisions and coordinating policies at federal level.
- A Union Constitutional Court would be created to settle disputes over questions of the exercise of the powers of Union organs.
- The legislative power of the Union would be exercised by the USSR Supreme Soviet, which consists of two chambers: the Soviet of the Republics, elected by the population of the whole country, and the Soviet of the Union.
- Decentralization of Power: The treaty aimed to decentralize political power by granting greater autonomy to the Republics giving them general guarantees about the right to control their own resources and legislate including the right to freely secede from the Union.
- Division of Powers: The central government would handle issues of defence, foreign affairs, financial system, energy resources and overall coordination along with issuing its currency. The republics would determine their own national-state and administrative territorial structure. The republics would also be given ownership of their natural resources, except gold and diamond resources, along with the right to establish direct diplomatic and trade relations with foreign states. The Republics and the central government would jointly determine military and foreign policy and work out policies on economy, fuel, and energy resources.

== Aftermath ==
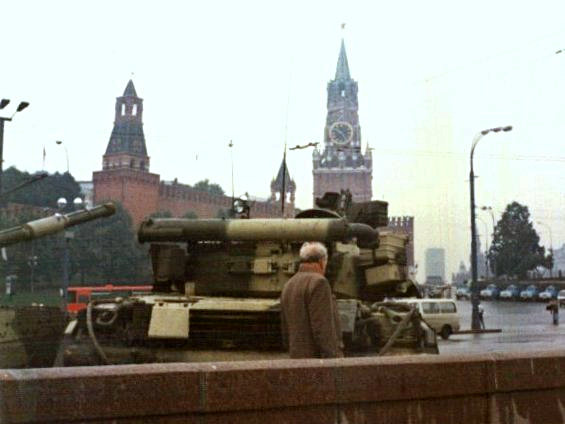
GKChP aligned tanks on Red Square during the August Coup

Although the treaty was intended to save the union, hardliners feared that it would encourage some of the smaller republics to follow the lead of Lithuania and press for full independence. On 18 August, the hardliners took control of the government after confining Gorbachev in his Crimean dacha in order to stop him from returning to Moscow to sign the treaty. The August Coup collapsed in the face of overwhelming opposition not only from the smaller republics but from larger ones, especially Russia.

The treaty was ultimately not signed, and the Belovezha Accords signed on 8 December 1991 by Russia, Ukraine, and Belarus marked the official dissolution of the Soviet Union, converting the republics into independent states. The leaders of the republics organized the Commonwealth of Independent States, an organization of 12 newly independent states, created to replace the Soviet Union. The Baltic states never joined the CIS. Georgia was not a member until 1993 and withdrew in 2008 following the Russo-Georgian War. Ukraine, which never formally became a member, ended its participation in CIS statutory bodies in 2018 due to the Russo-Ukrainian War.

== See also ==
- History of the Soviet Union (1982–1991)
- Perestroika
- Uskoreniye
- Glasnost
- New political thinking
- Demokratizatsiya (Soviet Union)
- 500 Days Program
- Predictions of the collapse of the Soviet Union
- Revolutions of 1989
- Parade of sovereignties

== Bibliography ==
- Furtado, Charles F. (1991). "Appendix 1: Draft Treaty on the Union of Sovereign States—27 June 1991 [FBIS]". Nationalities Papers. 19 (1): 93–114. doi:10.1080/00905999108408190. ISSN 0090-5992. (New Union Treay, draft text of 27 June 1991, English translation)
