= 1991 Ukrainian sovereignty referendum =

- 17 March 1991
- Do you agree that Ukraine should be part of a Union of Soviet Sovereign States on the basis on the Declaration of State Sovereignty of Ukraine?

Results
Choice	Votes	%
Yes	25,224,687	81.69%
No	5,655,701	18.31%
Valid votes	30,880,388	98.14%
Invalid or blank votes	584,703	1.86%
Total votes	31,465,091	100.00%
Registered voters/turnout	37,689,767	83.48%
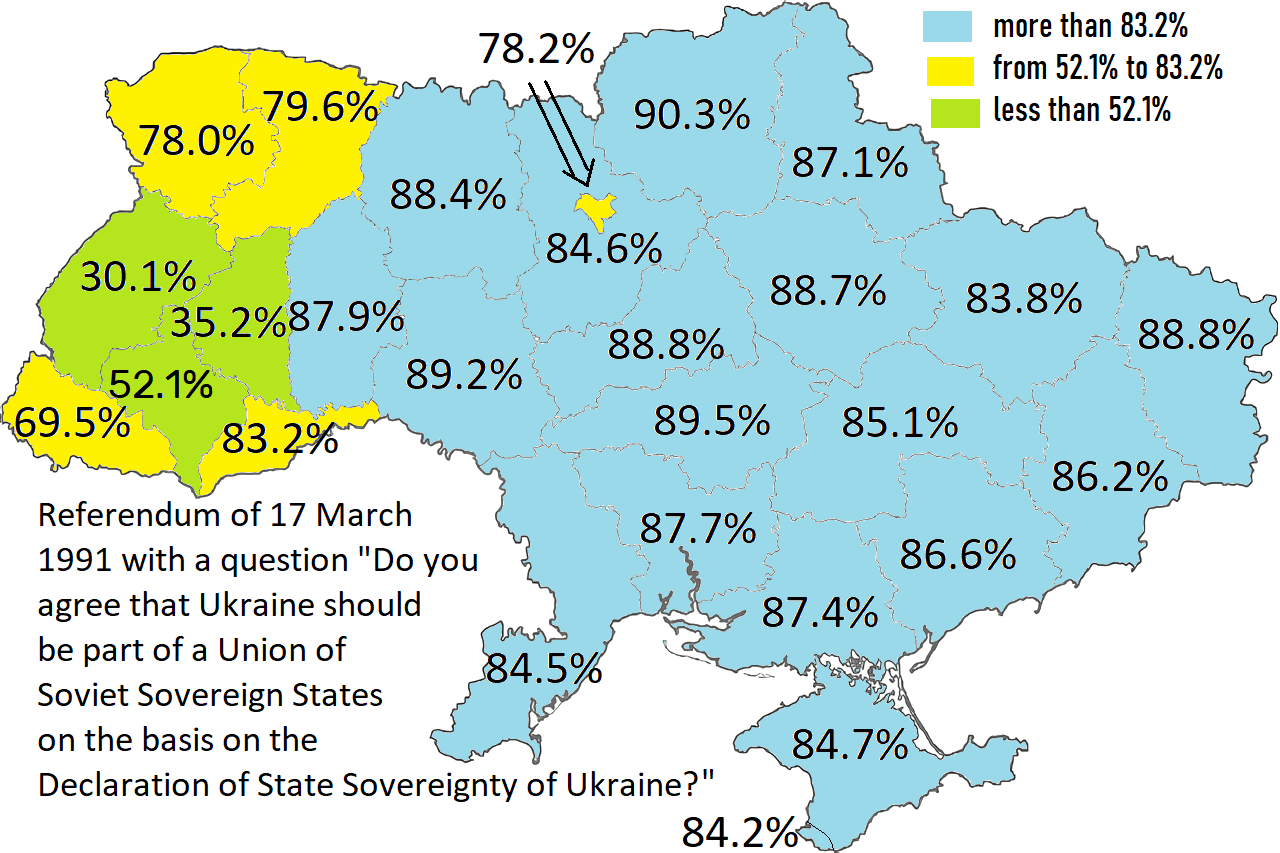
- Results by oblast

A sovereignty referendum was held in the Ukrainian SSR on 17 March 1991 as part of a USSR-wide referendum. Voters were asked two questions on reforming the Union of Soviet Socialist Republics into the Union of Sovereign States. Most voters supported the proposal, although in the pro-independence oblasts of Ivano-Frankivsk, Lviv and Ternopil, voters opted for independence as part of an additional question.

The referendum followed the Declaration of State Sovereignty by the republic's parliament on 16 July 1990 as sovereign republic within the Soviet Union in line with the results.

In August 1991, with the August Coup preventing the New Union Treaty from being adopted by the Soviet Union, a withdrawal from the USSR was proposed leading to a declaration of independence being drafted. The overwhelming majority of voters would back the idea in an independence referendum in December.

== Campaign ==
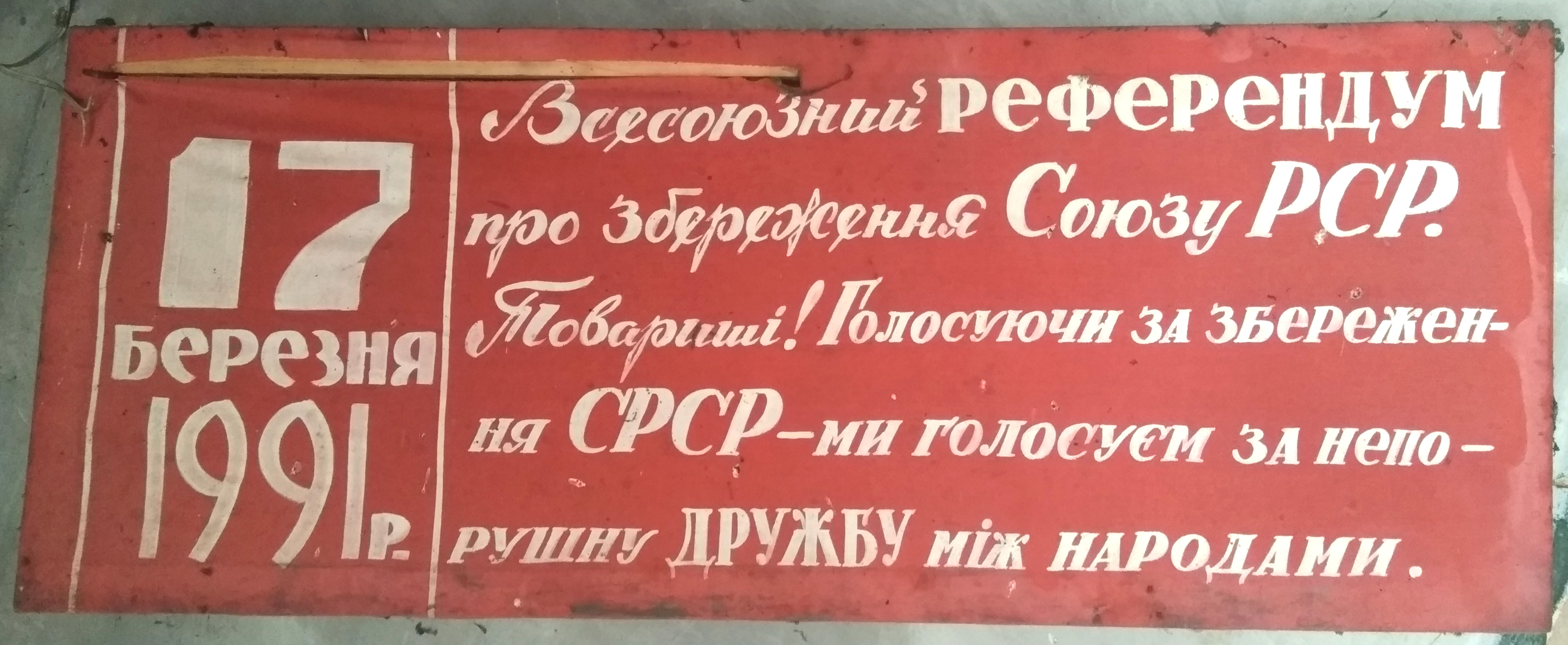
Banner for the All-Union referendum on the preservation of the USSR on 17 March 1991. Found in October 2019 in an abandoned factory building in the village of Markizivka, Cherkasy Oblast.

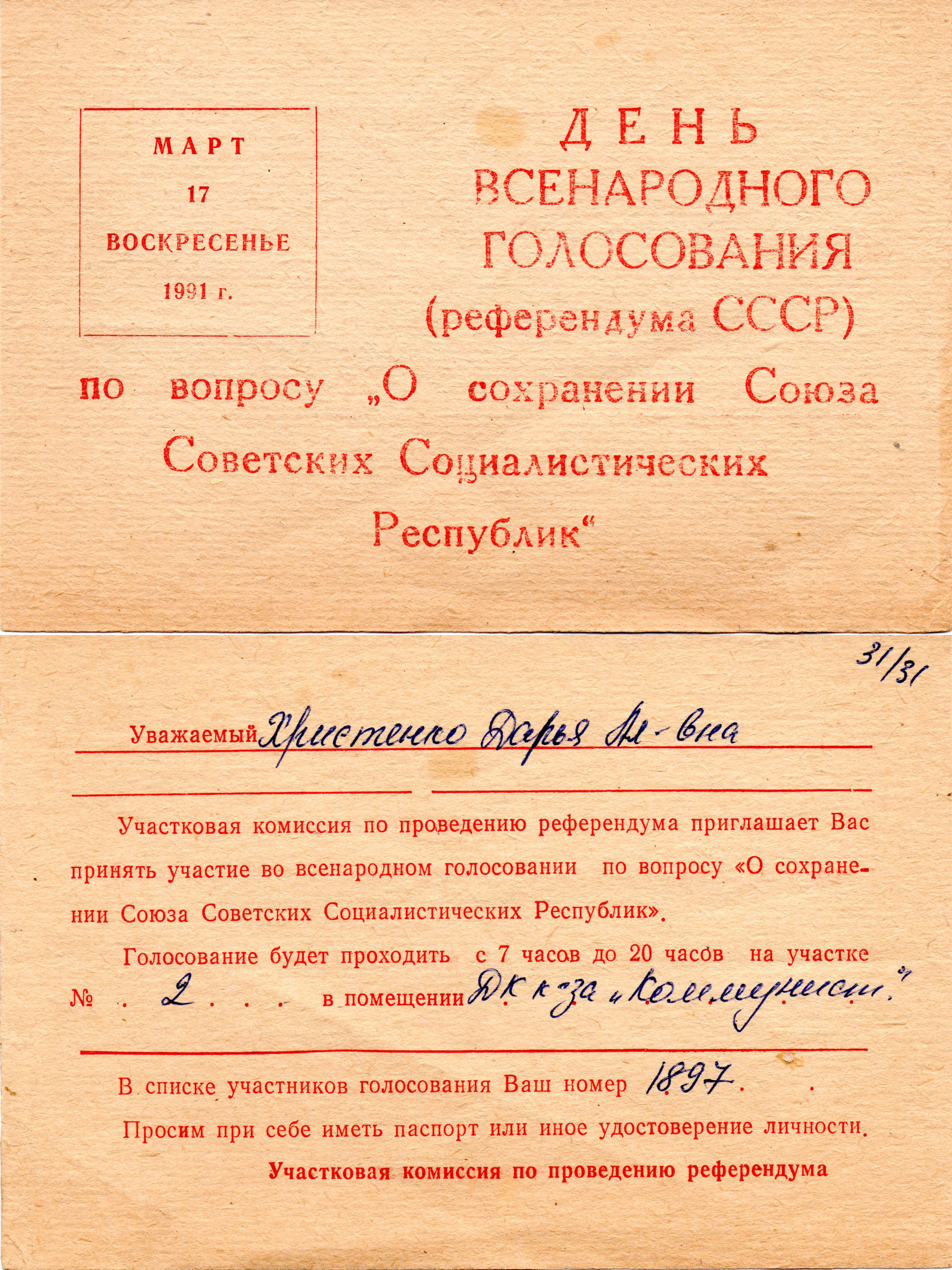
Invitation to participate in the All-Union referendum on 17 March 1991, sent to Darya Oleksandrovna Khrystenko, a resident of Bashtanka, Mykolaiv Oblast, Ukraine

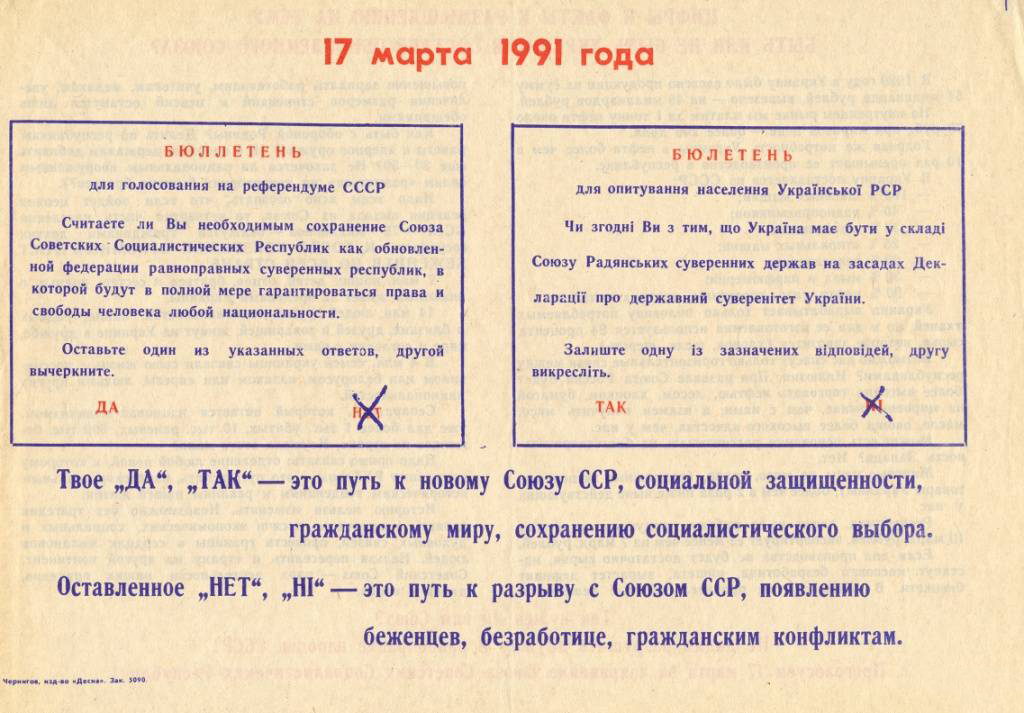
Bilingual pamphlet of the Chernihiv Oblast and city committees of the Communist Party of Ukraine calling for a 'Yes' vote on the New Union Treaty ("social security, civil peace and socialist choice."), and against the independence of Ukraine.

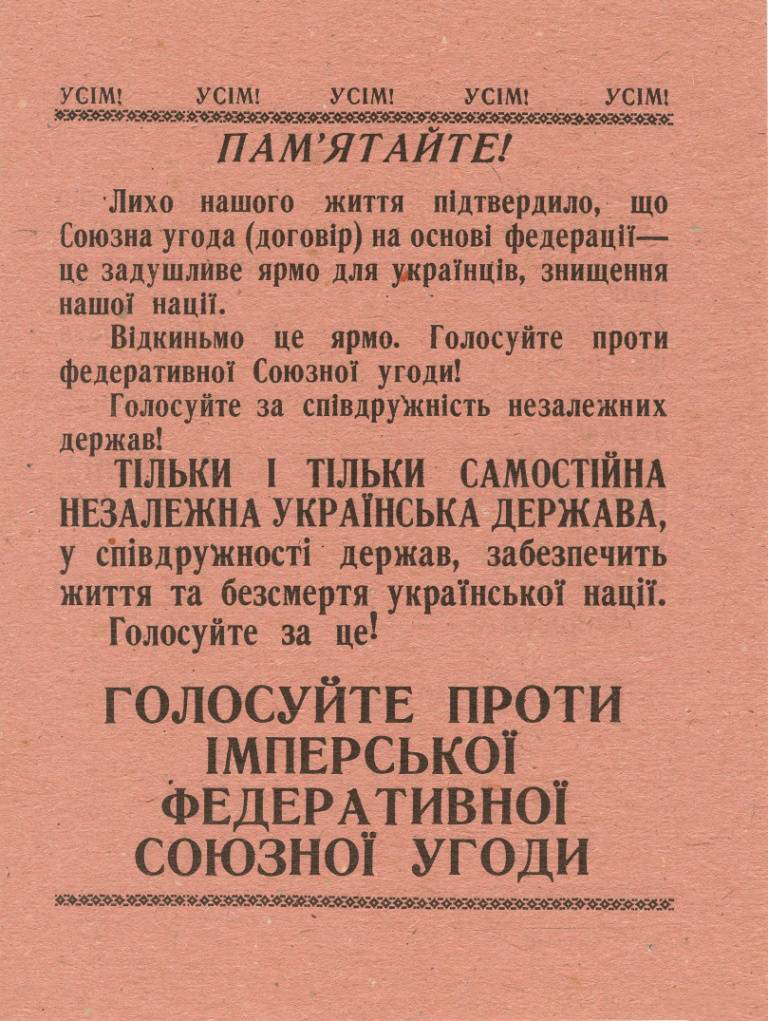
People's Movement of Ukraine (Rukh) pamphlet calling for a 'No' vote on the New Union Treaty. "Only an independent Ukrainian state can ensure the survival and immortality of the Ukrainian people. (...) Vote against the Imperial Federal Union Treaty."

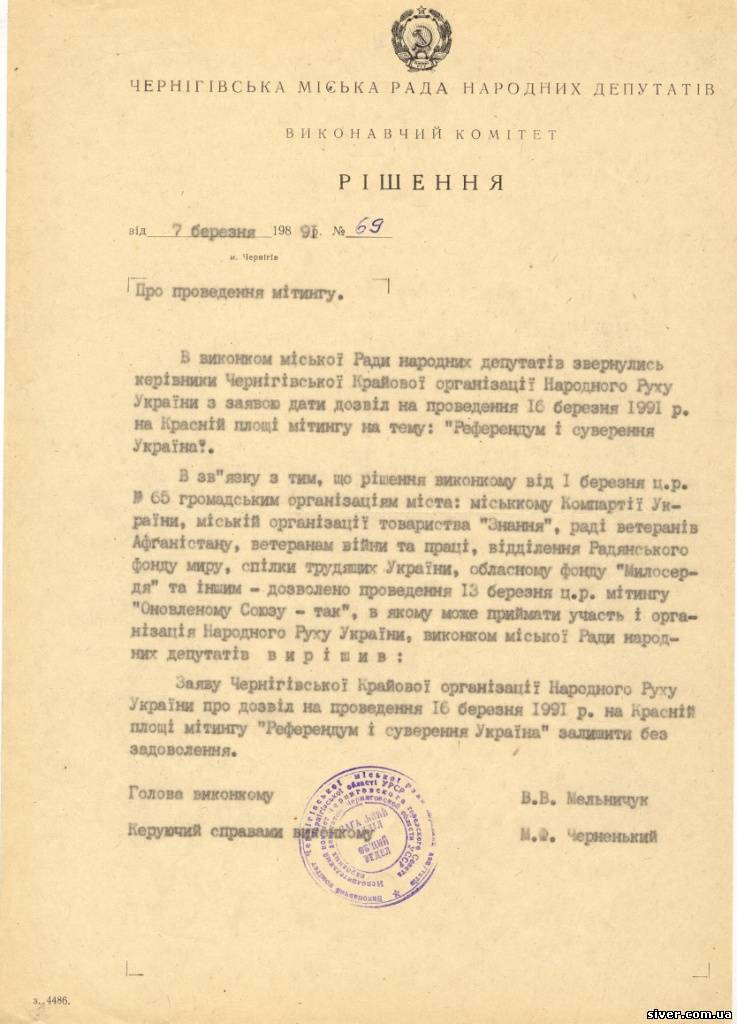
Decision of 7 March 1991 by the Chernihiv City Executive Committee prohibiting the People's Movement of Ukraine (Rukh) rally entitled ‘Referendum and Sovereign Ukraine’ from taking place on 16 March 1991 in Krasna Square, Chernihiv.

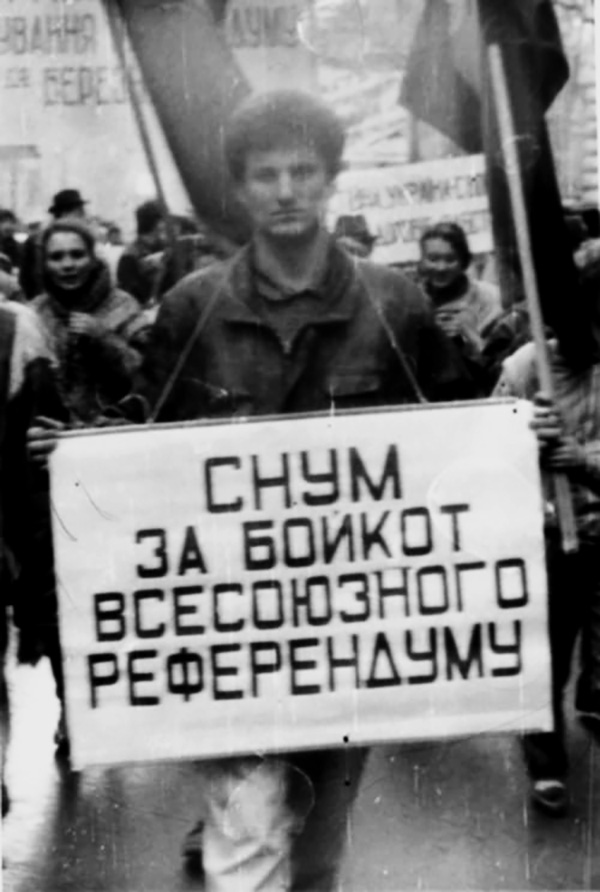
An Independent Ukrainian Youth Association (SNUM) demonstration: "SNUM calls for a boycott of the All-Union referendum."

== Republic-wide ==
Throughout the entire Soviet Union, citizens were first asked:

Do you consider necessary the preservation of the Union of Soviet Socialist Republics as a renewed federation of equal sovereign republics in which the rights and freedom of an individual of any nationality will be fully guaranteed?

A boycott campaign reduced the against votes in Western Ukraine.

Choice	Votes	%
For	22,110,899	71.48
Against	8,820,089	28.52
Total	30,930,988	100.00
Valid votes	30,930,988	98.15
Invalid/blank votes	583,256	1.85
Total votes	31,514,244	100.00
Registered voters/turnout	37,732,178	83.52

The Ukrainian SSR included an additional question for all of the republic's citizens; the voters were asked:

Do you agree that Ukraine should be part of a Union of Soviet Sovereign States on the basis on the Declaration of State Sovereignty of Ukraine?

Choice	Votes	%
For	25,224,687	81.69
Against	5,655,701	18.31
Total	30,880,388	100.00
Valid votes	30,880,388	98.14
Invalid/blank votes	584,703	1.86
Total votes	31,465,091	100.00
Registered voters/turnout	37,689,767	83.48

== Provincial ==
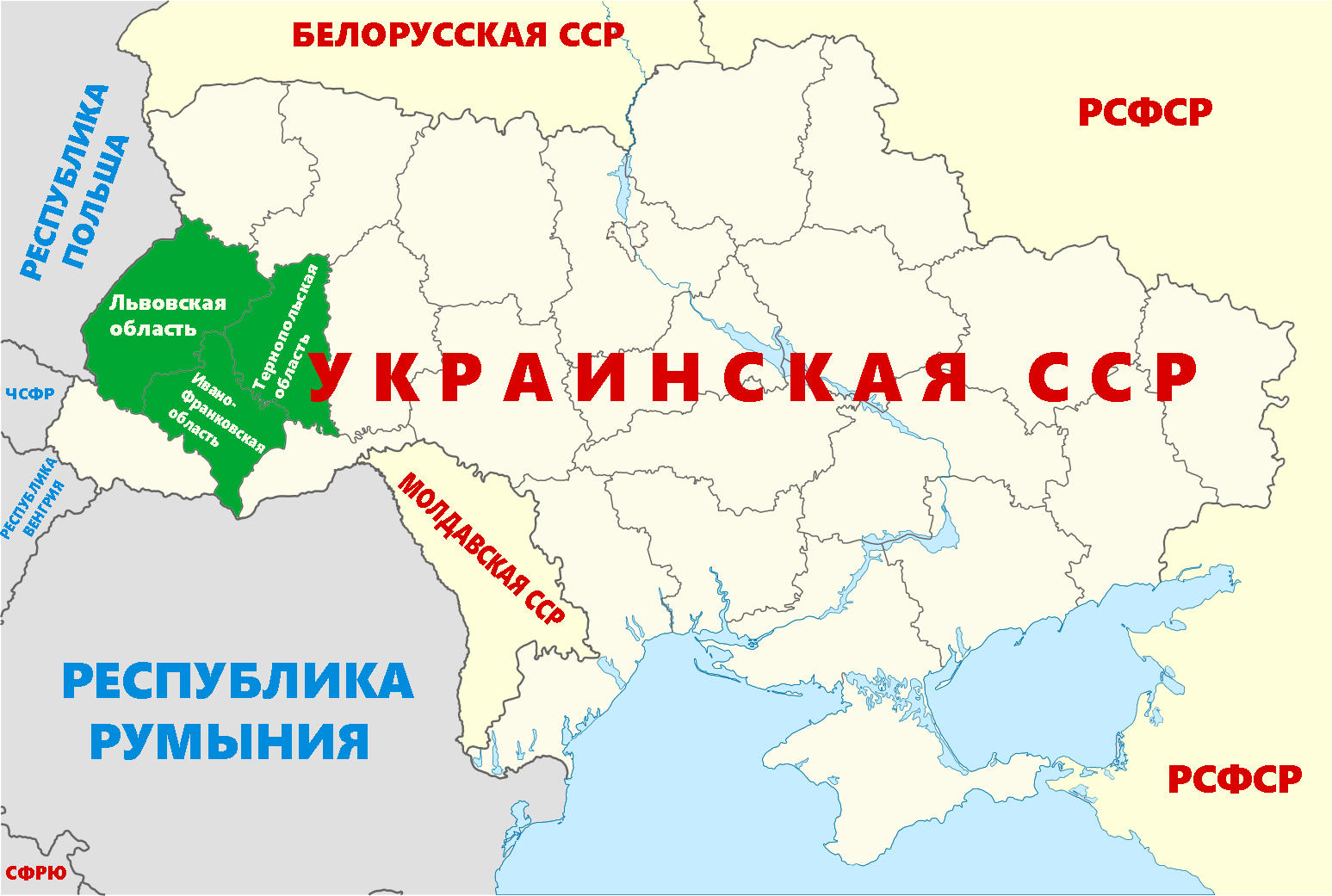
Location of Galicia in Ukraine

In the Galician oblasts of Ivano-Frankivsk, Lviv, and Ternopil, voters were asked an additional question regarding the creation of an independent state of Ukraine:

Do you want Ukraine to become an independent state that by itself decides all questions of domestic and foreign policy, secures equal rights of citizens regardless of their ethnic or religious affiliation?

Choice	Votes	%
For		88.3
Against		11.7
Total		
Source: Katchanovski
