= Declaration of State Sovereignty of Ukraine =

1990 resolution by the Parliament of Ukraine declaring sovereignty

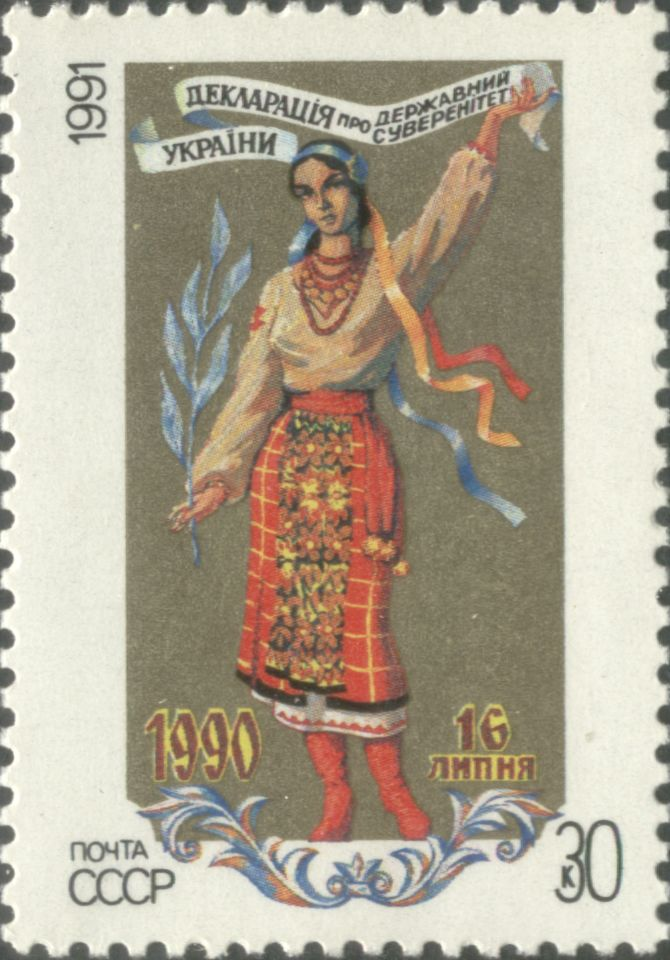
The Declaration of State Sovereignty of Ukraine was marked on a 1991 USSR postage stamp

The Declaration of State Sovereignty of Ukraine (Ukrainian: Декларація про державний суверенітет України, romanized: Deklaratsiia pro derzhavnyi suvernitet Ukrainy, IPA: [deklɐˈrɑts⁽ʲ⁾ijɐ pro derˈʒɑu̯nɪj sʊweren⁽ʲ⁾iˈtɛt ʊkrɐˈjinɪ]) was adopted on July 16, 1990, by the recently elected parliament of Ukrainian SSR by a vote of 355 for and four against.

The declaration established Ukraine, not Ukrainian SSR, as official name of the republic, and defined it as a sovereign nation state developing on the base of Ukrainian people's right for self-determination. It declared Ukraine's right to have its own Armed Forces, Internal Troops and Security Service. The document decreed that Ukrainian SSR laws took precedence over the laws of the USSR, and declared that the Ukrainian SSR would maintain its own army and its own national bank with the power to introduce its own currency. The declaration also proclaimed that the republic has intent to become "a permanently neutral state that does not participate in military blocs," and that it would not accept, nor produce, nor procure nuclear weapons.

The Declaration established the principles of Self-Determination of the Ukrainian Nation, Rule of the People, State Power, Citizenship of the Ukrainian SSR, Territorial Supremacy, Economic Independence, Environmental Safety, Cultural Development, External and Internal Security, and International Relations.

The Declaration established Ukrainian SSR citizenship while guaranteeing citizens the right to retain USSR citizenship, approving this by a vote of 296 for and 26 against. Additionally, on July 16, 1990, parliament by a vote of 339 for and five against proclaimed July 16 a national holiday in Ukraine.

== Historical context ==
=== Background ===
Following the beginning of Perestroika and Glasnost reforms in the Soviet Union, dissidents, including Levko Lukianenko, Stepan Khmara, Viacheslav Chornovil, Oles Shevchenko, Mykhailo and Bohdan Horyn, Ihor and Iryna Kalynets, Henrikh Altunian, Mustafa Dzhemilev, Yevhen Sverstiuk, Yosyf Zisels, Anatoliy Lupynis, Myroslav Marynovych, Yevhen Proniuk, Vasyl Lisovyi, Vasyl Ovsiyenko, Serhiy Babych and others, were able to return to Ukraine from Soviet prison camps and resumed their activities in struggle for national independence. In central and western regions of Ukraine, Ukrainian Helsinki Union and the People's Movement of Ukraine rose to prominence, meanwhile the eastern part of the republic was engulfed by a wave of labour strikes.

In this environment, Soviet Ukraine's first democratic election took place in March 1990. As a result of the vote, 90% of mandates in the Supreme Soviet of the Ukrainian SSR were taken by new candidates. On 15 May 1990 the last Soviet-era convocation of the Ukrainian parliament opened its work on a constant basis. On 8 June, an opposition group known as the People's Council was formed inside of the legislature with 125 mandates. The majority group "For a sovereign Soviet Ukraine", which was established on 28 June included into its rown only 239 members out of 380 Communist representatives.

The declaration was adopted during the collapse of the USSR. Interethnic tensions in the Asian and Caucasian republics had spilled over into bloody inter-ethnic clashes. On March 11, 1990, Lithuania declared its independence from the USSR, and Latvia and Estonia were actively preparing for the restoration of independence. On the streets of Ukrainian cities, the Ukrainian Interparty Assembly had already registered citizens of the Ukrainian People's Republic. Under the influence of new members and street protests under its walls, members of the new parliament took a course for the proclamation of Ukraine's state sovereignty and eventual independence.

Under pressure from public sentiment, the XXVIII Congress of the Communist Party adopted a resolution "On the State Sovereignty of the Ukrainian SSR" (June 1990). As the majority in the Verkhovna Rada of the Ukrainian SSR were Communists, the deputies of the Verkhovna Rada of the Ukrainian SSR adopted the Declaration in pursuance of the resolution of the Congress. Several draft projects of the Declaration of State Sovereignty were prepared by various parliamentary groups. After two months of discussions, on 16 July 1990 the declaration was approved by parliamentarians under the leadership of deputy speaker Ivan Plyushch.

Shortly before Ukraine, three other Soviet republics (Moldavia, Russia and Uzbekistan) had also proclaimed their sovereignty.

=== Aftermath ===
On 24 October 1990, Ukraine's Supreme Soviet adopted changes to the Constitution of the Ukrainian SSR, depriving the Communist Party of its leading role in state and society, and establishing supremacy of Ukrainian law over regulations of the Soviet Union. Simultaneously, a motion to return all Ukrainian military personnel serving outside of the republic was approved. Other acts adopted at the time established Ukraine's economic autonomy, created the National Bank of Ukraine, stopped the action of some Soviet decrees in Ukraine, subjected all enterprises and banks in the republican territory to Ukrainian jurisdiction and stopped the transfer of tax payments to the all-Union budget.

During the only referendum in the history of the USSR (All-Union Referendum on the Preservation of the USSR), which took place on March 17, 1991, with the assistance of the Government of the Ukrainian SSR, a republican consultative poll was held in Ukraine at the insistence of the People's Movement for Perestroika as part of the Union of Sovereign Republics on the basis of the Declaration of Sovereignty of Ukraine." More than 80% of respondents answered positively.

The question put for vote envisioned the creation of a completely different union state - not the Union of Soviet Socialis Republics, but the Union of Sovereign, Republics. Thus, the consequence of the ideological struggle of the People's Movement of Ukraine was that the referendum and poll in Ukraine legitimized at least two (and with Gorbachev's wish - three) completely different forms of union state and took a step towards independence - commitment to the republican government, development and adoption of the Declaration of Sovereignty of Ukraine.

== See also ==
- Declaration of Independence of Ukraine
- 1991 Ukrainian sovereignty referendum
- Declaration of State Sovereignty of the Russian Soviet Federative Socialist Republic
- Nuclear weapons and Ukraine
