= Kiev Bolshevik Uprising =

Uprising in Kiev in 1917

Kyiv Bolshevik Uprising
- Part of Ukrainian War of Independence, October Revolution
Date	8–13 November 1917
Location	Kiev
Result	Victory of the Kievan revolutionary committee

Belligerents
(Russian Soviet Federative Socialist Republic) Kievan Committee of the Bolshevik Party; Central Rada	Kiev Military District

Commanders and leaders
Georgy Pyatakov; Yan Gamarnik; Volodymyr Zatonsky	Lieutenant-General Mikhail Kvetsinsky

Strength
6,000 Bolshevik supporters 8,000 Central Rada supporters	10,000

The Kiev Bolshevik Uprising (8–13 November 1917) was a military struggle for power in Kiev after the fall of the Russian Provisional Government in the October Revolution. It ended in victory for the Kievan Committee of the Bolshevik Party and the Central Rada.

== Chronology ==
In the autumn of 1917, shortly after the Bolshevik Great October Revolution in Petrograd, Ukrainian Bolsheviks attempted to overthrow the Kiev government. Unlike in the Russian capital, however, the rebellion in Kiev failed. The Ukrainian Bolshevik Revolution came as a surprise to the leaders of the new Central Rada. Like most of the Russian public, Ukrainian officials were sure that the Russian Provisional Government would not remain in power for more than a few weeks.

The day after the events in Petrograd, the Ukrainian Central Council declared that it considered the transfer of power to the Council of Workers and Soldiers deputies unacceptable because the council was "only a part of the organized revolutionary democracy." Condemning the coup as undemocratic, the Central Council promised to fight to support any uprising in Ukraine.

The news of the Petrograd coup caused a surge in armed struggles in the capital of Ukraine. For the next three days, street fighting was waged in Kiev between supporters of the Soviet government and government forces; the latter were eventually forced to surrender. Despite its declarations, the Ukrainian Central Council adopted a position of friendly neutrality towards the Bolsheviks in this fight. The Bolsheviks seemed less dangerous to many Ukrainian politicians than the toppled Provisional Government, which had begun to express increasing hostility towards the Ukrainian national movement during the last weeks of its existence.

Taking advantage of the defeat of government forces, Ukrainian units took control of the city's main governmental institutions. Power in Kiev and Ukraine was transferred to the Central Council and its executive body, the General Secretariat. A Kiev Military District (KMD) commander was appointed: Lieutenant Colonel Viktor Pavlenko, a participant in the Ukrainian National movement. Kiev Bolsheviks did not object to the actions of the Central Council; both sides considered their main opponent to be the toppled Russian government, which seemed as if it could still return to power. However, soon afterwards it became obvious that the provisional government had finally descended from the political forefront. On the daily agenda, before the "proletarian revolution", rose the question of establishment of Soviet power in Ukraine. Ten members of the Kiev Committee of the Russian Social-Democratic Workers Party (Bolsheviks) had joined the Central Rada.

On November 8, at the initiative of the Central Rada, the Regional Committee in Protection of Revolution in Ukraine was created as a temporary government in Kiev. The committee, consisting of representatives of political parties, councils, and the city Duma, met in the Ukrainian Club building. The KMD headquarters supported the Russian Provisional Government and did not trust the State Committee, because it included the Bolsheviks. On November 9, the Central Rada defined its negative position in relation to the Petrograd coup, condemned Bolshevik actions, and said that "it would decisively fight against all attempts to support such uprisings in Ukraine". The Rada expressed agreement with the creation of a Russian homogeneous socialist government with representatives of all socialist parties.

The Kievan Bolsheviks, headed by Central Rada member Georgy Pyatakov, firmly adhered to Lenin's principles and did not agree with the Central Rada. That day, they left the State Committee for the Protection of the Revolution and held a joint meeting at the Bourgogne Theatre with representatives of workers' and soldiers' councils, trade unions, factory committees, and military units. Participants approved a resolution supporting the Bolshevik Revolution in Petrograd, and affirmed the Soviet government. The congress elected a revkom consisting of Bolsheviks such as Jan Hamarnyk, Oleksandr Horwits, Andriy Ivanov, Isaak Kreisberg, Volodymyr Zatonsky, and Ivan Kulyk, to whom they planned to transfer power. The same group instigated the January Uprising two months later to support the sack of Kiev by the advancing Bolshevik forces from the Ukrainian People's Republic of Soviets. In response to Bolshevik activities, KMD military forces were ordered to its center on November 10, 1917. They surrounded Mariinskyi Palace, where the local revkom was located, and searched the building containing the Kievan Duma Executive Committee and the Bolshevik Committee. Nearly all of the Kievan Committee of the Russian Social-Democratic Worker's Party (Bolsheviks) and the revkom, a total of 14 people, were arrested. That day, the State Committee for the Protection of the Revolution ceased to exist because KMD commander Mikhail Kvetsinsky refused to take orders from it; the committee's functions were transferred to the General Secretariat.

The Bolsheviks responded by reinstating the revkom (which included Volodymyr Zatonsky, Andriy Ivanov, and Ivan Kudrin) the following day, and began military operations against the KMD forces. The seventh session of the Central Rada was taking place, and the deputies formed a committee to find ways to stop the mayhem in Kiev. The session also authorized all power in Ukraine to be transferred to the Central Rada. For the next few days, street firefights occurred in some parts of the city (including Pechersk and Demiivka). On November 13, KMD headquarters on Bankova Street signed a cease-fire agreement with the Kiev revkom and withdrew from the city.

On November 16, 1917, at a joint meeting of the Central Rada and the executive committee of the soviets of the workers' and soldiers' deputies in Kiev, both bodies acknowledged the Rada as Ukraine's regional council. The III Universal of the Ukrainian People's Republic was created on November 20, declaring Ukraine an autonomous part of the Russian state with its capital in Kiev.

== See also ==
- Vinnytsia Bolshevik Uprising
