= 1st Congress of the Communist Party (Bolsheviks) of Ukraine =

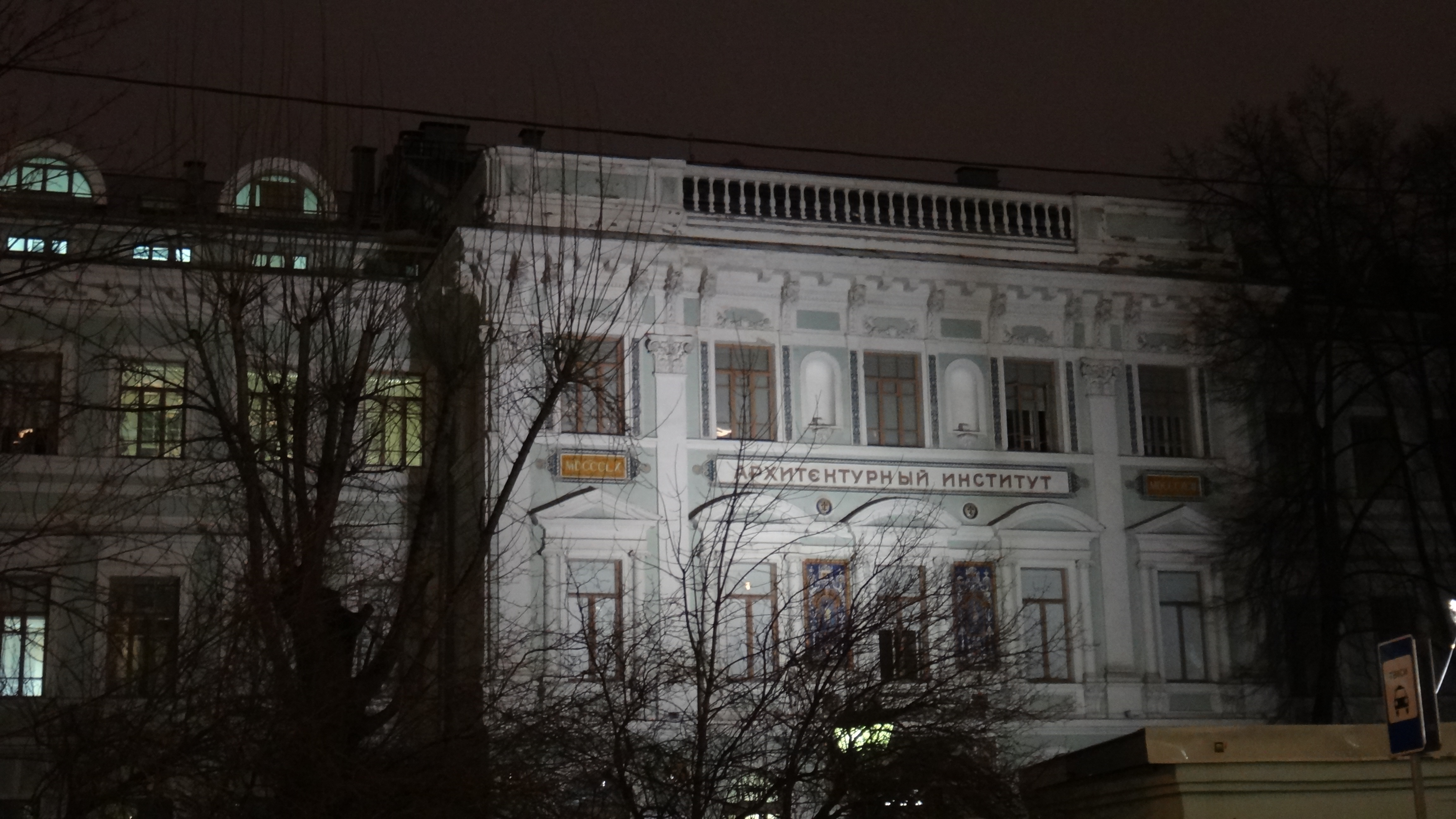
Building of the Moscow Architectural Institute at ulica Rozhdestvenka, 11 in Moscow

The 1st Congress of the CP(b)U (Communist Party of Ukraine (Soviet Union)) was held in Moscow in July 5–12, 1918. It was a constituent congress which led to creation of the political party by way of uniting existing Russian Bolsheviks in Ukraine and left faction of the Ukrainian Social-Democrats. The congress took place at the address ulica Rozhdestvenka, 11 (later ulica Zhdanova). Today, the building is located at MArchI (Moscow Architectural Institute).

The 65 plenipotentiary and 147 consultative delegates represented 45 Party organizations that accounted for over 4,000 Party members. The congress also had about 60 guests.

On 6 July 1918, delegates of the Congress with arms in hands participated in liquidation of the Left SR uprising in Moscow.

== Preceding events and preparation ==
An instruction on the creation of a single Bolshevik organization in Ukraine that the Central Committee of the Russian Communist Party (b) adopted in December 1917. It was realized at a regional congress (Krai Congress) of the RSDRP (b) in Kyiv on 16–18 December 1917, when the Ukrainian organization was named the RSDRP (b) – Social-Democracy of Ukraine.

A couple of weeks after the signing of the Treaty of Brest-Litovsk, on 19 March 1918, the Second All-Ukrainian Congress of Soviets convened at Yekaterinoslav (Dnipro), where the congress discussed and approved the treaty and also announced that Ukraine was only formally losing its federative ties with Soviet Russia and that workers of Ukraine would carry on a fight against the restored bourgeois regime. Recognition of Ukrainian independence was forced onto Soviet Russia by the Treaty of Brest-Litovsk. A cordial greeting about the declaration of independence of the "Ukrainian Federative Soviet Republic" was published in the Russian newspaper Pravda on 22 March 1918. Upon conclusion of the 2nd Congress of Soviets many members of the congress emigrated to Taganrog where at that time dominated Ukrainian population.

At that time, before 1918, in Ukraine existed two separate regional associations of the RSDLP(b): Donets-Kryvyi Rih industrial basin (centered in Yekaterinoslav, today Dnipro) and Southwestern Krai (centered in Kyiv and related to the Southwestern Krai). These two regional party organizations were established in July 1917 to coordinate party activity and struggle for power locally. The Kyiv Bolsheviks were the first to recognize the need to unify party organizations; moreover, many argued for forming a Social Democratic Party of Ukraine separate from the RSDLP(b), which would remain part of the RSDLP(b). The issue of establishing a unified all-Ukrainian Bolshevik organization arose in earnest following the October coup in Petrograd in 1917 and the formation of the Ukrainian People's Republic. However, in response to an initiative put forward by Kyiv party members, the Central Committee of the RSDLP(b) spoke out against a "separate Ukrainian party—regardless of its name or the program it might adopt." Even after the Ukrainian People's Republic of Soviets was proclaimed in Kharkiv in December 1917 and a provisional government—the People's Secretariat—was established, and Soviet Ukraine had to be recognized as a "self-determining entity," the Central Committee of the RSDLP(b) reaffirmed the long-standing principle regarding the Bolsheviks' party organization in Ukraine: it was to operate "with the status of a regional (essentially local or provincial) organization."

From the very beginning, two factions (or wings) have emerged: the Kyiv-based, conditionally the left, and the Yekaterinoslav-based, conditionally the right. Based on these factions, two views emerged on creating the party and on uniting the Bolshevik organizations of Ukraine. One was advocated by Nikolay Skripnik (Mykola Skrypnyk), who proposed at the Taganrog meeting (April 1918) a draft resolution that provided for the creation of a separate, organizationally independent Communist Party of Ukraine, with its Central Committee, congresses, and connected with the Russian Communist Party through the future international commission (Third International).

Another point of view, which reflected the centralizing tendencies of a part of the party workers of the Yekaterinoslav region and Donbas, was advocated by Emanuel Kviring. He proposed a draft resolution that provided for the creation of an autonomous party in Ukraine with its own Central Committee and congresses but subordinated to the general Central Committee and congresses of the Russian Communist Party.

In the roll-call vote, Skripnik's resolution, aimed at the creation of the CP(b)U, organizationally separated from the RKP(b), won the majority of votes. To prepare and convene a congress of Bolshevik organizations of Ukraine, the Taganrog meeting elected the Organizational Bureau in the composition of Nikolay Skripnik (secretary), Andrei Bubnov, Yan Gamarnik, Vladimir Zatonsky, Stanisław Kosior, Isaak Kreisberg, Georgy Pyatakov.

The decision of the meeting caused great concern in Moscow and personally for V.I. Lenin, since the only factor that allowed him to influence the situation in Ukraine and keep it under control was the party organizations of the Russian Communist Party (Bolsheviks). The weakening of this lever could lead to unforeseen consequences in the future, including the loss of Ukraine as a constituent part of the RSFSR. In addition, the formation of a separate Communist Party of Ukraine objectively destroyed not only the tactical tasks, but also the strategic goals of the RCP(b).

The situation in the party organizations of Ukraine required immediate intervention by the Central Committee of the RCP(b). Already at the end of April 1918, V.I. Lenin meets with members of the Organizational Bureau of Andrei Bubnov, Vladimir Zatonsky, Nikolay Skripnik, other party workers who most firmly defended the idea of the formation of a separate Communist Party of Ukraine, and a few days later, on May 3, 1918, under the leadership of Lenin, a meeting of the Central Committee of the RCP(b) was held, at which the question was again considered the issue on the attitude to the creation of the Communist Party (Bolsheviks) of Ukraine.

On the one hand, in the message of the Pravda newspaper on May 9, 1918, it was stated that "the Central Committee of the RCP(b), having discussed the issue of separating a separate Ukrainian Communist Party from the Russian Communist Party, does not find any objections to the creation of the Ukrainian Communist Party, since Ukraine is "independent state", and on the other hand, as historical and party literature shows, there was a second point of this decision, which for tactical reasons was not subject to publication in the open press, but unequivocally decided the future fate of the Communist Party of Ukraine as a component and integral part of a single centralized party.

Meanwhile, the Organizational Bureau headed by Nikolay Skripnik did a lot of work on strengthening the party underground in Ukraine and preparing for the First Congress of the Communist Party (Bolsheviks) of Ukraine. Suffice it to say that in just three months, 15 city-, 24 district- and sub-district, and more than 200 primary party organizations were created in the republic. In July 1918, the Bolshevik organizations of Ukraine had more than 4,000 members.

== Agenda ==
- Report of the Organization Bureau on convening the First Congress of the CP(b)U (delivered by Nikolay Skripnik)
- Report of the All-Ukrainian partisan provisional committee (delivered by Mikhail Mayorov)
- Report of the Bolshevik faction in the People's Secretariat (delivered by Andrei Bubnov)
- About the current moment (delivered by Yuriy Pyatakov)
- About armed uprising (delivered by Andrei Bubnov)
- About state relations of Soviet Ukraine with Soviet Russia (delivered by Emmanuel Kviring)
- About attitudes towards so-called "Soviets" (Radas)
- About attitudes towards other political parties (delivered by Vladimir Zatonskiy)
- About merging with left faction of the Ukrainian Social Democrats (Ukrainian Social Democratic Labour Party)
- About the Party (delivered by Nikolay Skripnik)
- About organizational issues (delivered by Nikolay Skripnik)
- About elections to the 1st Central Committee

== General overview of the congress ==
V. I. Lenin was elected honorary chairman of the congress. On the eve of the opening of the congress, he received a group of delegates, discussed with them the most important issues of the agenda, theses of the main reports and draft resolutions, and advised the party leadership on the revolutionary struggle of the Ukrainian people and the formation of the Communist Party of Ukraine. At the beginning of the work, the congress was warmly welcomed by representatives of the Social Democracy of the Kingdom of Poland and Lithuania, German, Hungarian, Czechoslovak, Romanian, South Slavic and Bessarabian communist groups under the Central Committee of the RCP(b), as well as the head of the Federation of Foreign Groups under the Central Committee of the RCP(b), Bela Kun.

The Congress listened to the reports of Nikolay Skripnik about the work of the Organizational Bureau for convening the congress and M. M. Mayorov on the activities of the All-Ukrainian Party temporary committee and approved the work of these bodies. When considering the issue of the current moment (the political situation and tasks of the party), as well as when discussing the issue of the armed uprising and several others, an intra-party struggle took place at the congress, caused by existing disagreements among part of the party workers in Ukraine regarding the assessment of prospects and driving forces of revolution in Ukraine, methods of struggle under the conditions of occupation, construction of the Communist Party of Ukraine. Some party workers (V. K. Averin, E. Y. Kwiring, Y. A. Yakovlev, etc.) held right-wing views, underestimated the internal possibilities of the revolutionary process in Ukraine, others (A. S. Bubnov, Y. B. Gamarnik, S. V. Kosior, Y. M. Kotsyubynskyi, I. M. Kreisberg, and others) overestimated them, downplayed the importance of the strengthening of Soviet power in Russia for the victory of the revolution in Ukraine, and tried to impose a line on a premature general armed uprising. The special danger of such "left" views was that it was precisely among the supporters that they sought and often found support from "left communists" - bitter enemies of Lenin's policy of peace and socialist construction, whose herald in Ukraine was Georgy Pyatakov. The congress condemned the positions of supporters of both right-wing and "left-wing" views and defined the tactical line of the CP(b)U, emphasizing that the decisive factor in the victory of the revolutionary forces of Ukraine is the strengthening of Soviet Russia.

After a sharp polemic, the Congress decided to form an autonomous CP(b)U on local issues, which is part of the RCP(b) and "subordinate in matters of programmatic general congresses of the Russian Communist Party and in matters of general policy to the Central Committee of the RCP". 33 delegates voted for this decision, 5 against and 16 abstained.

In the resolution "On Armed Uprising", the Congress developed a specific program of measures to prepare for it, which included, in particular, the creation of a network of underground military-revolutionary committees and the All-Ukrainian Central Military-Revolutionary Committee to guide the preparation and conduct of the uprising. The Revkoms were supposed to act under the leadership of party organizations.

The deeply internationalist decision on the relationship between Ukraine and Russia was of fundamental importance. Expressing the interests of the Ukrainian people, the congress, in the resolution "Ukraine and Russia," spoke in favor of the revolutionary unification of Soviet Ukraine and Soviet Russia, further strengthening the friendship of the Ukrainian and Russian peoples as the main condition for victory over the forces of the counter-revolution. The resolution exposed the nationalist slogan of "independence of Ukraine" as a screen used by German imperialists and their accomplices and Ukrainian bourgeois nationalists to enslave the working people. The main task of the congress was the formation of the Communist Party of Ukraine. The congress decided (on proposition of E. Kwiring): "To unite the party communist organizations of Ukraine into an autonomous, in local matters, the Communist Party of Ukraine with its Central Committee and its congresses, but which is part of the unified Russian Communist Party with subordination to general congresses in programmatic matters of the Russian Communist Party, and in general political issues - the Central Committee of the RCP".

However, E. Kwiring and his supporters, even after the resolution proposed by them was adopted by the congress, continued the struggle directed against the integrity of the Communist Party of Ukraine itself. When voting on the resolution on organizational issues, the structural construction of the party, on the rights and duties of regional party committees, Kwiring made amendments, the essence of which was that the regional committees of the Communist Party of Ukraine should also exist on "common grounds." At first glance, this amendment was allegedly unprincipled, but, as N. Skripnik pointed out, it allowed an ambiguous interpretation, because regional committees of the Communist Party of Ukraine "will exist on general grounds with Latvian, Polish, etc., and not with the Urals and others included in the RCP(b)". That is, in case of approval of Kwiring's amendment, the Communist Party of Ukraine practically retained the right to influence its regional committees.

How heated the discussions on these issues were is shown by the fact that, when all of the amendments to the resolution proposed by E. Kwiring were rejected by the majority of the congress delegates, he actually resorted to blackmail, declaring: "If the congress takes the path of suppression regional organizations, then part of the congress will go the other way, because for them (representatives of the Donets-Krivoi Rog region) the connection with the Ukrainian party is generally not as significant as with the Russian one."

The constant threats from Kwiring and his supporters caused deep indignation in N. Skripnik, but in order to prevent a split in the congress and not to bury the idea of creating a party, he proposed a compromise wording regarding the procedure for organizing regional bureaus before the convening of regional party conferences.

The congress decided to create illegal regional party organizations in the occupied territory of Ukraine. In the resolution "On the attitude towards other parties", the congress emphasized that no agreements with SRs, Mensheviks, Bundists, Ukrainian SRs, Ukrainian social democrats and anarchists are inadmissible and party organizations must wage a merciless struggle against them. At the same time, the congress indicated the need to establish contacts with the parties that express the interests of the small peasantry, with the aim of "pushing them on the path of active struggle for the power of the Soviets and subordinating their struggle to the actual leadership of the proletarian Communist Party."

The historical significance of the congress lies in the fact that it completed the process of uniting the Bolshevik organizations of Ukraine, created the Communist Party of Ukraine, which took shape on the inviolable Leninist ideological, organizational, theoretical and tactical principles as an integral and integral part, a combat unit of a single RKP(b).

== Central Committee ==
The Congress elected the following members to the Central Committee on 12 July 1918:

Elected Members

1. Amosov Ivan Karpovich
2. Bubnov Andrei Sergeevich
3. Butsenko Afanasiy Ivanovich
4. Gruzman Shulim Aizikovich
5. Zatonskiy Vladimir Petrovich
6. Kartvelishvili Lavrentiy Iosifovich
7. Kviring Emmanuil Ionovich
8. Kosior Stanislav Vikentievich
9. Kreisberg Isaac Mironovich
10. Lutovinov Yuriy Khrisanfovich
11. Pyatakov Yuriy Leonidovich
12. Farbman Rafail Borisovich
13. Rovner Pinkhus Lazarevich
14. Tarskiy (Sokolovskiy) Leonid Lvovich
15. Schwartz Isaac Izrailevich

Candidates

1. Gamarnik Jan Borisovich
2. Lebed Dmitriy Zakharovich
3. Mayorov Mikhail Moiseevich (Biberman Meer Moiseevich)
4. Skripnik Nikolay Alekseevich
5. Slinko Petr Fedorovich
6. Yakovlev (Epstein) Yakov Arkadievich

The same day, on 12 July 1918 took place a plenum (plenary session) of the Central Committee that elected Yuriy Pyatakov as the Secretary of the Central Committee (see First Secretary of the Communist Party of Ukraine).

=== The Central Committee plenums ===
- 12 July 1918
- 8–9 September 1918
- 16 October 1918

=== Changes to the composition between congresses ===
At the Central Committee plenum on 8–9 September 1918, Comrade Rafail and Lavrentiy Kartvelishvili were removed from the Central Committee, while Mikhail Mayorov and Pyotr Slinko gained full member status. At the same time, Georgiy Pyatakov was relived from duties of the party secretary and replaced by Serafima Gopner.

== See also ==
- Central Committee of the 1st Congress of the Communist Party (Bolsheviks) of Ukraine
- 7th Congress of the Russian Communist Party (Bolsheviks) (March 1918)
