= 2nd Congress of the Communist Party (Bolsheviks) of Ukraine =

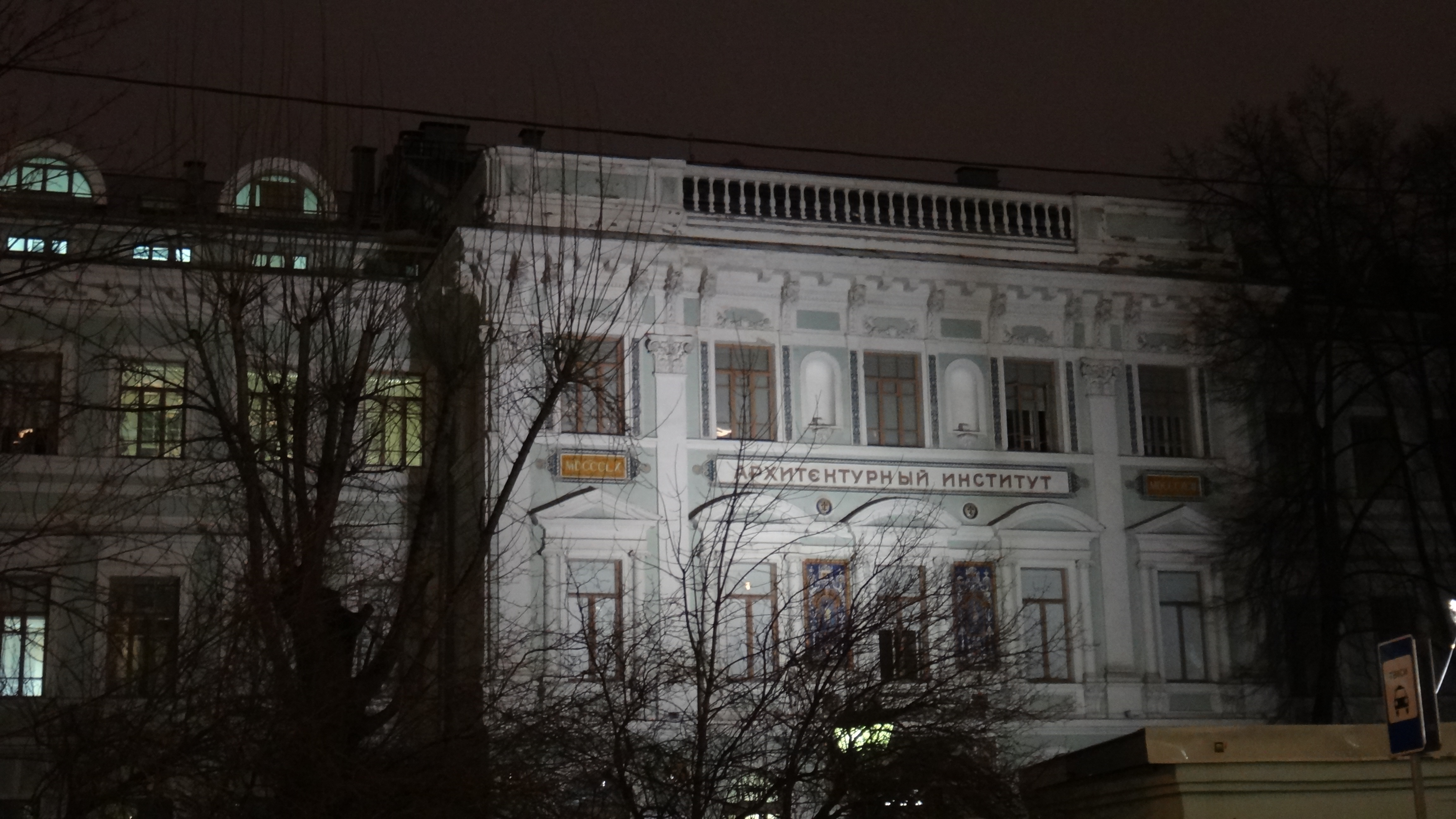
Building of the Moscow Architectural Institute at ulica Rozhdestvenka, 11 in Moscow

The 2nd Congress of the CP(b)U (Communist Party of Ukraine (Soviet Union)) was held in Moscow, between October 17 and 22, 1918.

There were 125 party delegates who represented around 9,000 Communists of underground organizations of Ukraine and Crimea. The congress also attended representatives of Bulgarian, German, Hungarian, Czech groups of the Russian Communist Party (Bolsheviks) as well as the Romanian Communist Party and the Communists of Poland.

== Preceding events and preparation ==
The decision of the 1st congress of the CP(b)U on the creation of the Communist Party of Ukraine was met with approval in the vast majority of party branches, it corresponded to their aspiration to unity on an all-Ukrainian scale as part of a single party, with its Central Committee, significantly intensified their work, which delegates of the 2nd congress of the CP(b)U, which took place three months later, emphasized with particular elation in their speeches.

However, the issue of the basic law of the internal life of the Communist Party of Ukraine - the statute, which fixes its name and purpose, regulates activities, defines the rights and obligations of party members and its bodies - was not considered at the 1st Congress of the Communist Party of Ukraine. As recorded in the minutes of the congress, when considering the organizational and practical tasks of the party, the speaker (N. Skripnik) did not dwell on the question of the statute, since it automatically fell away due to the fact of the adoption of the resolution on the entry of the Communist Party of Ukraine into the single Russian Communist Party, which had its own statute. The absence of its own statute, apparently, did not suit all party members, because already at the 2nd Congress of the CP(b)U, held in October 1918, the question of the statute arose again. Moreover, at the evening meeting on October 21, a statutory commission was even elected (S. Kosior, P. Rovner, I. Kreisberg, I. Schwartz, N. Beschetvertnoi), which was tasked with preparing a draft of the statute for the next meeting together with the presidium of the congress.

== Agenda ==
- Information from localities
- Report of the Central Committee of the Communist Party (Bolsheviks) of Ukraine (CC KP(b)U)
- Report of the All-Ukrainian Central Military Revolutionary Committee (AUCMRC)
- Information about international situation
- Information about current moment
- About celebration of the First anniversary of the Great October Socialist Revolution
- About relationships inter-partisan organizations and revolutionary committees
- About the attitude towards the Party of Left Socialist Revolutionaries, Left Bund members and other parties that announced recognition of the Soviet power platform
- About the CP(b)U statute
- About the convocation time of the 3rd Congress of the Communist Party (Bolsheviks) of Ukraine
- Elections of governing bodies of the CP(b)U

== Statutory Commission ==
- Stanisław Kosior
- Pinkhus Rovner
- Isaak Kreisberg
- Isaac Schwartz
- Nikolay Bestchetvertnoi

== Central Committee ==
The Congress elected the following members to the Central Committee on October 22, 1918:

Elected Members

1. Sergeyev Fyodor Andreyevich (Comrade Artyom)
2. Beschetvertnoi Nikolay Ilyich
3. Gruzman Shulim Aizikovich
4. Drobnis Yakov Naumovich
5. Zaks (Gladnev) Samuil Markovich
6. Zatonskiy Vladimir Petrovich
7. Zimak Alexander Iosifovich
8. Kwiring Emmanuil Ionovich
9. Pyatakov Yuriy Leonidovich
10. Reut Mikhail Venediktovich
11. Slinko Petr Fedorovich
12. Stalin (Dzhugashvili) Iosif Vissarionovich
13. Tarskiy (Sokolovskiy) Leonid Lvovich
14. Schwartz Isaac Izrailevich
15. Yakovlev (Epstein) Yakov Arkadievich

Candidates

1. Amosov Ivan Karpovich
2. Bliznichenko Andrei Yemelyanovich
3. Vinokurov Naum Mikhailovich
4. Gamarnik Jan Borisovich
5. Zharko Afanasiy Mikhailovich
6. Zolotov Fyodor Mikhailovich
7. Klochko Vladimir Yuryevich
8. Kosior Stanislav Vikentievich
9. Lugovoy (Levinstein) Alexander Vasilyevich
10. Morshin I. D. (Rusin Alexey Ivanovich)
11. Rovner Pinkhus Lazarevich
12. Skripnik Nikolay Alekseevich
13. Smolyakov Lazar Abramovich
14. Kharchenko Taras Ivanovich
15. Chernysh (Borisov) B. V.

The next day on October 23, 1918, took place a plenum (plenary session) of the Central Committee that elected Emanuel Kwiring as the Secretary of the Central Committee (see First Secretary of the Communist Party of Ukraine).

=== Former members ===
Elected Members

1. Bubnov Andrei Sergeevich
2. Butsenko Afanasiy Ivanovich
3. Kartvelishvili Lavrentiy Iosifovich
4. Kreisberg Isaac Mironovich
5. Lutovinov Yuriy Khrisanfovich
6. Farbman Rafail Borisovich

Candidates

1. Lebed Dmitriy Zakharovich
2. Mayorov Mikhail Moiseevich (Biberman Meer Moiseevich)

=== The Central Committee plenums ===
- 23–26 October 1918

== General overview of the congress ==
In 15 reports from Oblast, Governorate and City underground committees of CP(b)U, there was analyzed situation at places, disclosed the party work on reinforcement of the Bolshevik underground cells and revolutionary committees as well as their connections with masses, leadership in fighting of working people against the oppressors. In informational reports of the CC CP(b)U and the AUCMRC results were summed up on CP(b)U activities on creation and strengthening of underground party organizations and revolutionary committees, leadership of the 1918 All-Ukrainian rail worker strike, armed struggle against the occupiers, creation in the "neutral zone" Ukrainian insurgent divisions. Delegates criticized the fallacy of tactics of CC CP(b)U and AUCMRC which led to a premature call to general armed uprising in August 1918. The congress emphasized that in order to strengthen the party leadership through all forms of people's war, it is necessary to shift the center of gravity of the party's work to the occupied territory, especially to the industrial areas, to strengthen the Ukrainian Soviet Divisions; that victory over the occupiers and the counter-revolution can be achieved only on the basis of the union of the working people of Ukraine and Russia. The congress indicated that the CP(b) of Ukraine should coordinate its actions with the forces of proletarian Russia. In a special resolution, the congress noted the need to unify the trade unions of Ukraine and Russia and obliged the communists to strengthen the work in the trade unions so that they act under the slogans of the Soviet power. Congress in special resolution put forward a demand to strengthen the party leadership of underground revolutionary committees. In the resolution "On the celebration of the anniversary of the October Revolution", the congress obliged the party organizations to release special leaflets, carry on in workers' areas one-day strikes and demonstrations and mass rallies in the villages. The congress was held under the banner of proletarian internationalism. In the address "To the workers of all countries", he declared solidarity with the revolutionary struggle of the proletariat of Europe. In the spirit of V. I. Lenin's instructions, the congress resolved the issue of providing comprehensive aid to the revolutionary movement among the Austro-German soldiers. The Congress elected the CC CP(b)U. For the first time, the Audit Commission of the CP(b)U was elected. On October 22, 1918, delegates of the congress took part in the meeting of the All-Russian Central Executive Committee, Moscow Councils of Trade Committees and Trade Unions, where V.I. Lenin, who expressed great attention to Ukraine and warned the Communist Party about the need for the intervention of the Entente in Ukraine, about the importance of the right choice, an expedient moment for the people against the counter-revolution, expressed confidence that "when the Ukrainian victory of the workers and peasants will go hand in hand with the strengthening of power in Russia and its successes, then socialist proletarian Ukraine will not only win, but also be invincible!"

To prevent separatist tendencies in party building, the 8th Congress of the RCP(b) in March 1919 adopted a special resolution in which the existence of Soviet republican parties in Ukraine, Latvia, Lithuania and Belarus was actually recognized as temporary (the need for the functioning of a single centralized CP was emphasized), while it is stated that the Central Committees of Ukrainian, Latvian, and Lithuanian communist parties enjoy the rights of regional party committees and will be fully subordinated to the Central Committee of the RCP(b). Meanwhile, views opposed to the principles of party building decreed by the Central Committee of the RCP(b) became widespread among the Bolsheviks of Ukraine. Based on the right of the Ukrainian people to an independent Soviet state, individual members of the CP(b)U argued for the independence of the Ukrainian CP. In 1919, V. Shakhray and S. Mazlakh published the brochure "To the wave. What is happening in Ukraine and with Ukraine", which actually became the ideological platform of Ukrainian national communism. The authors of the brochure were expelled from the party, but another group of party workers (H. Lapchinskyi, P. Popov, Ya. Lander, etc.) took similar positions. The Central Committee of the RCP(b) qualified such actions as nationalist and divisive, and reprimanded their leaders. The replenishment of the CP(b)U with left elements of Ukrainian socialist parties (Ukrainian social democrats – independents and Ukrainian social revolutionaries – strugglers) increased the circle of supporters among the Ukrainian Bolsheviks of national-communist views.

=== Organizational issues ===
==== Party statute ====
The party congress opened on the morning of October 22, at which, after the election of the members of the Central Committee of the CP(b)U, the congress concluded its work, not mentioning a single word about the statutory commission formed the day before. Judging by everything, the statutory commission, formed by the Second Congress of the CP(b)U, has not finished its work. In connection with this, it becomes clear why a rather powerful team of researchers of the history of the Communist Party of Ukraine for many decades did not manage to find in the archives even drafts of the draft statute of the Communist Party of Ukraine. However, the issue of the statute of the Communist Party of Ukraine arose repeatedly during the two years, especially at the end of 1919.

The analysis of archival documents shows that the vast majority of rank-and-file communists who worked in the deep underground did not know about the status of the newly formed Communist Party of Ukraine, and the absence of its charter put party organizations in an ambiguous position, requiring their "self-determination", the development of a line of relations, on the one hand - from the Central Committee of the RCP(b), and from the other - from the Central Committee of the CP(b)U. After all, which party were they members of? After all, in the party tickets that began to be issued in 1919, it was noted that the owner was a member of the Communist Party (Bolsheviks) of Ukraine, and not a single word mentioned the RCP(b). Moreover, the statute of the CP(b) of Ukraine was submitted in the tab to the party ticket. But it is known that at the congresses of the CP(b)U its statute was not approved.

It turns out that after the Bolsheviks took control of most of Ukraine and at the beginning of the party and the Soviet development in the republic, the Central Committee (CC) of the CP(b)U again returned to this issue and, on April 3, 1919, instructed one of its members - Taras Kharechko (member of the CC) - to draw up a temporary statute, which was later published in the newspaper "Kommunist" is an organ of the Central Committee and the Kyiv City Committee of the CP(b)U. This statute formulated provisions on membership in the party, on the structure of the republican party organization - from the Central Committee to povit (uyezd) and volost organizations inclusively- and also contained instructions to volost and povit party committees and party centers.

In addition, a 3-month candidacy period was introduced for workers and peasants entering the CP(b)U, and a 6-month one for representatives of other social groups, etc. It is appropriate to say that these provisions of the CP(b)U draft statute were later borrowed for the new statute of the RCP(b), which was approved in December 1919 by the VIII All-Russian Conference of the RCP(b) and permanently included in all the statutes of the RCP(b) - CPSU and changed only depending on the specific existing historical conditions in which the party operated.

At that time, the statutory question for the majority of local party organizations was so confused and became so acute that it was even brought up for consideration by the plenum of the Central Committee of the CP(b)U later on February 6, 1920, which was forced by its decision to confirm to local party organizations that "The statute of the Russian Communist Party (b) extends to Ukraine as well," and recommended using the existing party tickets before developing of own new form.

==== Party membership tickets ====
Party tickets of the CP(b)U really needed unification, because in each region they differed both in terms of content and form. At the same time, some party organizations issued party tickets in Russian, and others in Ukrainian; moreover, with different party names: Ukrainian Communist Party (Bolsheviks) of Ukraine, Communist Party (Bolsheviks) of Ukraine, etc.

Before the Central Committee of the Communist Party (Bolsheviks) of Ukraine had time to approve its new forms of party tickets, the resolution of the 9th Congress of the Russian Communist Party (Bolsheviks) on organizational issues established a system of a single party ticket as the basis for the registration of party members, which allowed the Central Committee of the Russian Communist Party (Bolsheviks) to solve several problems at the same time. In particular, to carry out a centralized record of party members, to carry out the distribution and regrouping of party forces on a nationwide scale, to ensure promotion and advancement of party members, etc. That is, the introduction of the system of a single party ticket laid the foundations of centralized management not only of party life, but also of national economic affairs complexes of national republics.

In May 1920, the first batch of unified party tickets in Russian language arrived in Ukraine, which to some extent caused a negative reaction on the part of the Central Committee of the CP(b)U, and immediately became the subject of consideration at its May (1920) plenum. In the adopted decision, the Central Committee of the CP(b)U decided to print party tickets in Ukrainian language, and those that had previously been sent were returned to Moscow. However, the aforementioned demarches from the Central Committee of the CP(b)U could no longer help preserve even the nominal independence of the Communist Party of Ukraine. The Central Committee of the RCP(b) gradually, step by step, increasingly restricted its rights, turning it into an ordinary regional party organization, fully subordinated to the Central Committee of the RCP(b).

After the 4th conference of the CP(b)U, the question of own party tickets and the statute of the Communist Party of Ukraine was never taken into consideration until 1990, and the norms laid down in the statutes of the RCP(b) - VKP(b) - CPSU, and the introduction of a single party ticket led to the absolute centralization of party life and actually paralyzed the will of the Central Committees of the Communist Parties of the national republics, deprived them of the opportunity to independently and promptly solve socio-economic and political problems, which subsequently caused enormous damage to the communist movement in the entire post-Soviet space.
