= Second All-Ukrainian Congress of Soviets =

1918 congress

Second All-Ukrainian Congress of Soviets (Ukrainian: Другий Всеукраїнський з'їзд Рад) was a congress of soviets (councils) of workers, peasants, Red-army-men deputies that took place in Katerynoslav (Dnipro) on March 17-19, 1918.

== Composition ==
There were 964 delegates. By the end of the congress, the number of delegates had increased to 1,250.

- Bolsheviks - 401
- Bolshevik supporters - 27
- Left SRs (Russia and Ukraine, with supporters) - 414
- USDLP (left wing) - 13
- Unaffiliated - 82
- others - 25

The presidium composition was:
Skripnik, Ivanov, Kviring, Gamarin[k], Terletsky, Odoyevsky, Boichenko, Tkachinsky, Serdiuk, Medvedev.

- Bolsheviks - 4
- Left SRs (Russia) - 5
- Left SRs (Ukraine) - 1

== Agenda ==
- current moment
  - deposition towards the Central Council of Ukraine
  - deposition towards war and peace
- organization of armed forces
- Ukraine and Russian SFSR
- government report
- land and finance issues
- election to the Central Executive Committee
- others

== Decisions ==
Despite the sharp interfactional struggle all Bolshevik's resolution have passed.

- the congress approved the Treaty of Brest-Litovsk
- the congress declared independence of Ukraine and also announced that relationships of the Soviet republics will remain within the limits identified earlier
- (current moment) the congress condemned the policy of Central Council of Ukraine demanding withdrawal of the Austria-Germany troops from the territory of Ukraine and calls were placed to combat the widespread establishment of Soviet power. Representatives of left wing Ukrainian parties were proposing to seek a compromise with the Central Council of Ukraine with aim to consolidate national forces, but the majority did not support their propositions
- the congress passed a law about socialization of land that was adopted at the 3rd All-Russian Congress of Soviets, resolutions "About political system", decrees on 8-hour workday and workers' control, about organization of the Red Army of Ukraine

The congress elected 102 members to the Central Executive Committee (CVK):

- Bolsheviks - 47
- SRs (Russia and Ukraine) - 49
- left USDLP - 5
- Lewica - 1

Volodymyr Zatonsky was elected Chairman of the CVK.

== See also ==
- 1st Congress of the Communist Party (Bolsheviks) of Ukraine
