= Communist Party of Ukraine (Soviet Union) =

Banned political party in Ukraine

- Ukrainian name: Комуністична Партія України
- Russian name: Коммунистическая партия Украины
- First Secretary: Stanislav Hurenko (last)
- Founders: Georgy Pyatakov; Mykola Skrypnyk; Stanislav Kosior; Volodymyr Zatonsky; Yan Gamarnik; Andrei Bubnov; Isaak Kreisberg
- Founded: 20 April 1918; 108 years ago
- Banned: 30 August 1991; 35 years ago
- Preceded by: Ukraine cells of the Russian Social Democratic Labour Party (Bolsheviks); Ukrainian Social Democratic Labour Party (left wing)
- Succeeded by: Party of Democratic Revival of Ukraine; Socialist Party of Ukraine (banned); Peasant Party of Ukraine; Communist Party of Ukraine (banned)
- Headquarters: Building 11 Ordzhonikidze Street, Lypky, Kyiv
- Newspaper: Pravda Ukrainy (in Russian); Radyanska Ukrayina (in Ukrainian)
- Youth wing: Komsomol of Ukraine; Young Pioneers
- Ideology: Communism; Marxism–Leninism (Soviet)
- Political position: Far-left
- National affiliation: Communist Party of the Soviet Union
- Colours: Red
- Slogan: "Workers of the world, unite!"
- Anthem: The Internationale
- Verkhovna Rada (1990): 239 / 450 (53%)

Party flag

The Communist Party of Ukraine (Ukrainian: Комуністична Партія України, romanized: Komunistychna Partiya Ukrayiny, КПУ, KPU; Russian: Коммунистическая партия Украины, romanized: Kommunisticheskaya partiya Ukrainy) was the founding and ruling political party of the Ukrainian SSR operated as a republican branch of the Communist Party of the Soviet Union (CPSU).

Founded as the Communist Party (Bolsheviks) of Ukraine (CP(b)U) in 1918 in Taganrog, then part of Ukrainian Soviet Republic, it was the sole governing party in Ukraine as part of the Soviet Union. While the anti-Bolshevik Ukrainian People's Republic had its own political parties of socialist ideologies, the Communist Party of Ukraine was created out of the party of Russian Bolsheviks in Ukraine known as the RSDRP(b) – Social-Democracy of Ukraine. The party was denied the right to have a separate party statute and was governed by the statute of the Russian Communist Party (Bolsheviks), All-Union Communist Party (Bolsheviks) and Communist Party of the Soviet Union. In 1952, the party was renamed as the Communist Party of Ukraine.

Like all other CPSU republican branches, the CPU was committed, in accordance to the CPSU party statute, to adherence to Marxist–Leninist ideology based on the writings of Vladimir Lenin and Karl Marx, and formalized under Joseph Stalin. The party had pursued state socialism, under which all industries were nationalized and a planned economy was introduced. Prior to the adoption of central planning in 1929, Lenin had introduced a mixed economy, commonly referred to as the New Economic Policy, in the 1920s, which allowed to introduce certain capitalist elements in the Soviet economy after the disastrous experience of war communism.

On 30 August 1991, the Communist Party was outlawed in Ukraine. After the ban was lifted in 1993, the Communist Party of Ukraine was re-created in Donetsk under the leadership of Petro Symonenko. Following the 2014 Revolution of Dignity, all communist parties on the territory of Ukraine were outlawed and banned, with the ideology being criminalized.

== History ==
=== Russian Bolsheviks in Ukraine ===
The party traces its beginning to committees and party's cells of the Russian Social Democratic Labour Party (RSDLP) that existed at the end of the 19th century in all bigger cities and industrial centers on Ukrainian territory which was part of the Russian Empire. Under influence from the League of Struggle for the Emancipation of the Working Class in Saint Petersburg, in 1897 such organization was also formed in Kyiv and Yekaterinoslav which also were taking part in preparation and convocation of the 1st Congress of the Russian Social Democratic Labour Party in 1898. With release of newspaper Iskra in December 1900 in Germany, on territory of Ukraine spread out a network of the Lenin's Iskra group and organizations.

Among the most notable activists in Ukraine during that period were Ivan Babushkin, Rosalia Zemlyachka, Pyotr Krasikov, Isaak Lalayants, Friedrichs Lengniks, Maxim Litvinov, Grigory Petrovsky, Mykola Skrypnyk (Nikolay Skripnik), Dmitry Ulyanov, Vasiliy Shelgunov, Alexander Schlichter, Alexander Tsiurupa, and others. Following the 2nd Congress of the Russian Social Democratic Labour Party (1903) in social-democratic organizations has developed a struggle between Mensheviks and Bolsheviks. On behalf of Vladimir Lenin, in 1904 Vatslav Vorovsky with Lalayants and Levitskiy created in Odessa the Southern Bureau of the RSDLP that led activities of Odessa, Yekaterinoslav, Nikolayev committees, brought together around itself Bolshevik organizations of the South, conducted great deal of work in preparation to the 3rd Congress of the Russian Social Democratic Labour Party in 1905.

During the 1905 Russian Revolution, Bolsheviks in Ukraine played only a minor role. In more than 50 cities and settlements Soviets of working deputies were created. In December 1905, Bolsheviks led number of armed uprisings in Ukraine, among which were in Horlivka, Alexandrovsk (Zaporizhia), Kharkiv. Kyiv, Mykolaiv and many other cities were covered with strike action. In course of the revolution the RSDLP organizations in Ukraine grew significantly and in 1907 they were accounted for over 20,000 men. (Note: Due to russification of Ukraine, the Ukrainian Soviet Encyclopedia does not differentiate between two homonymic words in both languages (Russian and Ukrainian) that have different semantics. The Russian word for people "chelovek" (Russian: человек) (person, human) looks as it was adopted in Ukrainian here as [male] "cholovik" (Ukrainian: чоловік) (man, guy). Given estimation for men, possibly includes estimation for people in whole if Russian was used.) In 1905, the Ukrainian Social Democratic Spilka joined the RSDLP. Organizers and leaders of party's activities during this time were Comrade Artyom (Fyodor Sergeev), Vladimir Bonch-Bruyevich, Miron Vladimirov, Kliment Voroshilov, Serafima Gopner, Sergey Gusev, Lidia Knipovich, Gleb Krzhizhanovsky, Grigory Petrovsky, Nikolay Skripnik, Alexander Schlichter, Yemelyan Yaroslavsky, and others.

During the following period of government reaction in 1907–10, Bolshevik organizations in Ukraine have suffered significant losses, yet continued their revolutionary activities. Guided by decisions of the 1912 Prague Conference, those Bolsheviks carried out work to expand and strengthen ties with the masses, their international upbringing, preparing workers to new revolutionary battles, were exposing supporters of what was labeled as "liquidationism", "otzovizm" (recalling representatives from the State Duma), and bourgeois nationalism. During the years of World War I (1914–18), the Bolsheviks of Ukraine propagated the Lenin's slogan of transforming the imperialist war into a civil war and fought against "social chauvinism and revolutionary defeatism."

During the 1917 February Revolution, known as the February bourgeois democratic revolution in communist jargon, the Bolshevik organizations guided by the Central Committee of the Russian Social Democratic Labour Party claimed that they led the struggle of the working people against monarchy, and after Nicholas II's abdication led a struggle for the masses against whom communists named as conciliators and bourgeois nationalists. The process of differentiation of the Bolsheviks and the Mensheviks in the joint organizations of the RSDLP intensified and as well as the process of creation of independent Bolshevik organizations that in July 1917 accounted for around 33,000 men.

According to Yevgenia Bosch, the Kyiv party organization after the February Revolution accounted for only near 200 members (Note: Bosch, Ye., page 11) and it mainly was concentrated on elections to the Soviet of Workers' Deputies. The performance of the party organization was far from stellar and huge advantage in the soviet (council) was secured by what Bosch called "petty bourgeois parties". The majority in the soviet was formed by Mensheviks. The soviet's executive committee (ispolkom) was also dominated by Mensheviks and Bundists, while Bolsheviks managed to have own representative Maks Savelyev. The Kyiv party organization chose not to participate in elections to the Soviet of Soldiers' Deputies due to lack of relations with local military. Also the Kyiv Bolsheviks chose to ignore the All-Ukrainian National Congress that was convened on proposition of the Central Council of Ukraine on 18 – 20 April [O.S. 5 – 7 April] 1917. (Note: Bosch, Ye., page 12) The most important role for the organization was participation in the 1 May street demonstration to the point that the Bolsheviks decided to conducted own one in spite that the event was already organized by the Soviet of Workers' Deputies.

Unlike any other Bolshevik organizations in Ukraine that adopted the Lenin's April Theses without discussions, on 23 April 1917, the Kyiv party cell approved resolution in which it called the April Theses "yet insufficiently substantiated and developed". On 28 April 1917, at the city's assembly Bolsheviks stated that those theses require further discussion and promised to publish them in their newspaper. They never did. At the 7th All-Russian conference of Bolsheviks where the theses were adopted practically unanimously, the Kyiv Bolsheviks, led by Yurii Pyatakov and who had other thought, did not dare to oppose Vladimir Lenin.

=== Struggle for establishment of the Soviet power in Ukraine ===
Following the "July Days" and the semi-legal 6th Congress of the Russian Social Democratic Labour Party, Bolsheviks of Ukraine began to prepare the workers for an armed uprising "for Soviet power" (Ukrainian: за владу Рад, Russian: за власть Советов). Big help was provided to them by the Central Committee of the Petrograd-based RSDLP(b) that maintained connection with more than 50 of its party organizations in Ukraine. Active role in the preparation process of the masses to the "Socialist Revolution" (October Revolution) was conducted by Vasiliy Averin, Yevgenia Bosch, Kliment Voroshilov, Yan Gamarnik, Serafima Gopner, Vladimir Zatonsky, Andrei Ivanov, Emanuel Kviring, Yuriy Kotsiubynsky, Dmitriy Lebed, Grigory Petrovsky, Vitaly Primakov, Fyodor Sergeyev, Ivan Smirnov, and others. During the summer of 1917 on territory of modern Ukraine were formed two regional (oblast) branches of the RSDLP(b) of Southwestern Krai and Donets-Krivoi Rog Basin and later in the fall the bureau of the RSDLP(b) military organizations of the Southwestern Front (due to ongoing World War I). According to Yevgenia Bosch, the regional branch of the RSDLP(b) was supposed to consist of 7 guberniyas (Governorates): Kyiv, Chernihiv, Podolia, Volhynia, Poltava, Kherson, and Yekaterinoslav. (Note: Bosch, Ye., page 22) Also membership of the party in Ukraine grew significantly in 1917 from 7,000 in April to 50,000 in October. Following the October Revolution in Petrograd, at the 2nd All-Russian Congress of Soviets among its delegates, there were 65 Bolsheviks from Ukraine.

The very next day after the October Revolution, on 8–13 November (26–31 October by old style), 1917 Bolsheviks in Kyiv, who have been headquartered at the Mariinskyi Palace, attempted to secure power in Kyiv with less success and, after the Bolshevik's victory over the Kyiv Military District garrison, the authority in Kyiv was secured by the liberal democratic Regional Committee in Protection of Revolution in Ukraine where important role played the Central Council of Ukraine. In a week the Central Council adopted its "Third Universal" where it condemned the Bolshevik coup-d'état and declared Ukraine in federative union with the social democratic Russian Republic (instead of the communist Soviet Russia). In response to that on 26 November 1917, the Bolshevik Sovnarkom published its manifesto to the all population "About struggle with counter-revolutionary insurgency of Kaledin, Kornilov, Dutov, and supported by the Central Rada (О борьбе с контрреволюционным восстанием Каледина, Корнилова, Дутова, поддерживаемым Центральной Радой)".

On 16—18 December (3—5 by old style), 1917, the regional congress of the RSDLP(b) of the South-West region was held in Kyiv, and on 18—19 December (5—6), the regional conference of the RSDLP(b) of the Donets-Kryvyi Rih basin was held in Kharkiv. They called on the workers to fight against the Ukrainian Central Council.

=== Communist Party of Ukraine ===
==== Establishment ====
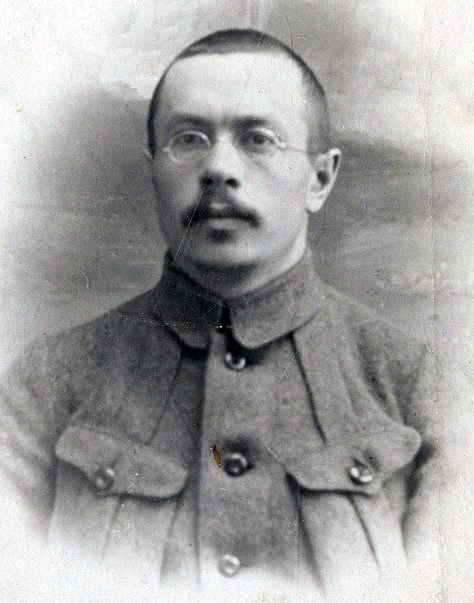
Vasyl Shakhrai, one of early proponets of the party's establishment

Ideas of establishing a separate Ukrainian Bolshevik party were first expressed by Poltava activists Vasyl Shakhrai and Serhii Mazlakh in late 1917. Similar views were supported by a group of Kyiv Bolsheviks including Volodymyr Zatonsky and Yuri Lapchynsky, who were eventually joined by Mykola Skrypnyk. Most of the party's constituent members were former Russian Bolsheviks who in 1917 proclaimed themselves "RSDRP(b) – Social-Democracy of Ukraine" and with the help of the Antonov-Ovseyenko expeditionary forces of Petrograd and Moscow Red Guards instigated a civil war in Ukraine by routing local Red Guards. Some Ukrainian politicians from left faction of the Ukrainian Social Democratic Labour Party (also known as Left Ukrainian Social Democrats or unofficially as "Ukrainian Bolsheviks") joined the Bolsheviks in January 1918.

After the signing of the Treaty of Brest-Litovsk, the Bolshevik faction of Ukraine was forced to dissolve as all Bolsheviks were forced out of Ukraine. Following the 1918 Central Powers occupation of Ukraine in the aftermath of the Treaty of Brest-Litovsk, Ukrainian Bolsheviks had to retreat to Taganrog, where a conference was held by their leadership on 18-20 April 1918 with the involvement of representatives of the Donetsk-Krivoi Rog Soviet Republic. At that conference, a resolution to create a separate Ukrainian Bolshevik party under the name Communist Party (Bolshevik) of Ukraine was adopted on the proposal of Skrypnyk. An organizational bureau of the party was formed, composed of Georgy Pyatakov, Mykola Skrypnyk, Stanislav Kosior, Volodymyr Zatonsky, Yan Gamarnik, Andrei Bubnov and Isaak Kreisberg.

Upon the creation of the party there were two points of view on the party's structure and relationship with the Russian Communist Party: one idea proposed by the Kiev faction leader Mykola Skrypnyk included relationship with the Russian Communist Party through Comintern, while the other one proposed by the Yekaterinoslav and Donbas leader Emmanuel Kviring included relationship with the Central Committee of the Russian Communist Party. On 5–12 July 1918 in Moscow the 1st Party Congress of the Communist Party of Ukraine took place. During the congress, Ukrainian Bolsheviks were forced to abandon the notion of their party's independence, and it was included into the structure of Russian Bolshevik Party as its regional branch. During the congress there the central committee consisting of 15 members and 6 candidates to membership was established: Ivan Amosov, Andrei Bubnov, Afanasi Butsenko, Shulim Gruzman, Vladimir Zatonski, Lavreti Kartvelishvili, Emmanuel Kviring, Stanisław Kosior, Isaak Kreisberg, Iuri Lutovinov, Georgi Piatakov, Rafail Farbman, Pinkhus Rovner, Leonid Tarski, Isaak Shvarts; Yan Gamarnik, Dmitri Lebed, Mikhail Maiorov, Mykola Skrypnyk, Petro Slynko, Iakov Iakovlev. At the time of the party's creation, only 7% of its members identified as ethnic Ukrainians.

==== Consolidation of power and purges ====
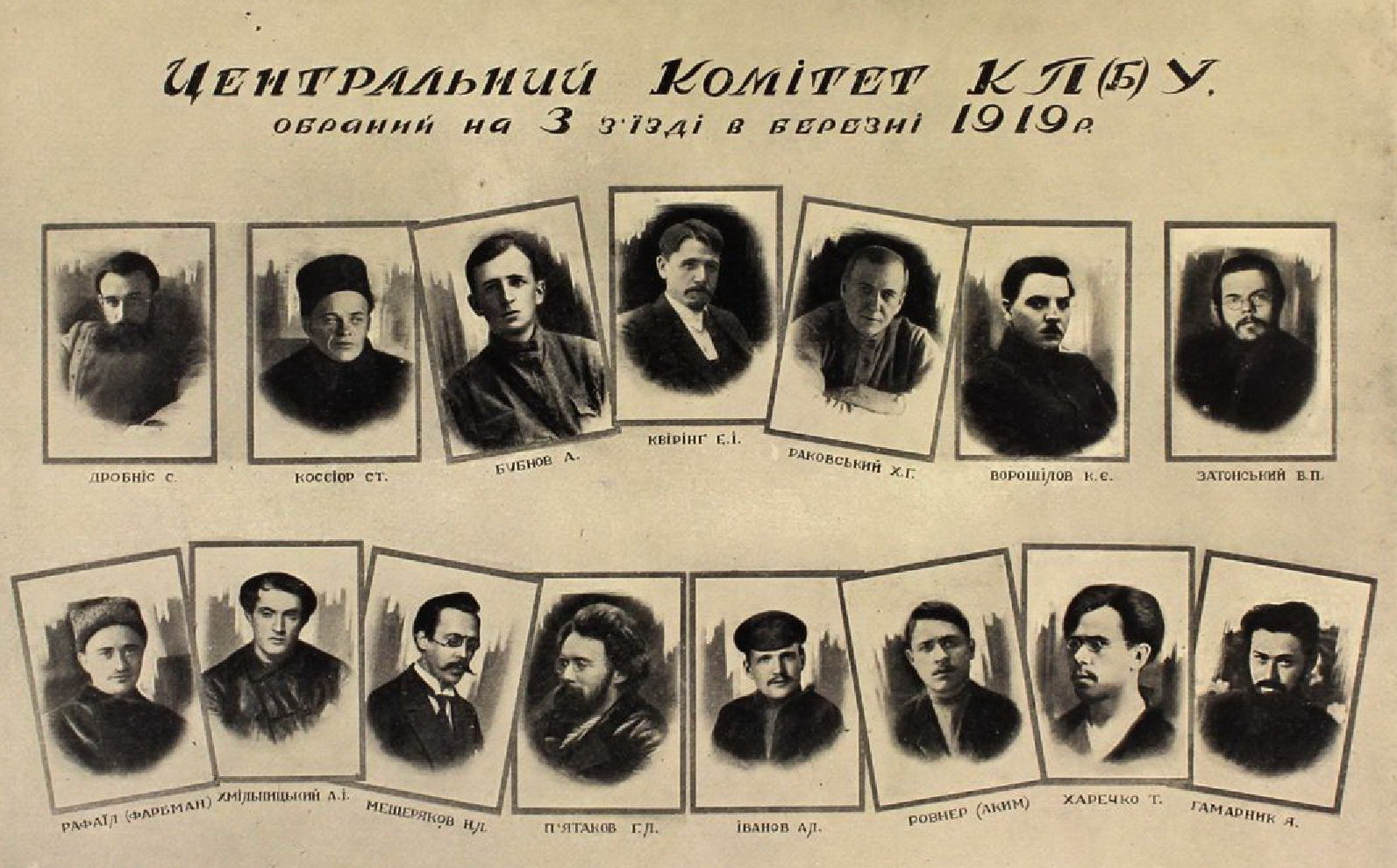
Members of the party's Central Committee in 1919

The Bolsheviks returned to Ukraine several months later in what is known both as the second Soviet-Ukrainian War and the Ukrainian War of Independence. In May 1919 the Communist Party of Ukraine had 36,000 members, more than half of them concentrated in the Donbas, Kharkiv and Katerynoslav. A major part of the party's members were ethnic Russians and Jews, and half of its activists in regions had arrived from Great Russia. Very few locals supported the Bolsheviks and joined their guerrilla units fighting against the White Army. Due to the mass flight of party members to Russia, in October 1919 the Central Committee of the Communist Party of Ukraine was disbanded. The party restored its power in Ukraine following the retreat of Denikin's troops in December of the same year. During that period it supported the policies of War Communism, which were extremely unpopular among the Ukrainian population and led to numerous revolts. In 1920 the Ukrainian Communist Party (Borotbists) merged with the Communist Party of Ukraine, followed by the Ukrainian Communist Party in 1925. As of 1923, only 24% of members of the Communist Party of Ukraine were ethnic Ukrainians.

In 1922-1923 the party's representatives in Moscow, Mykola Skrypnyk, Alexander Shumsky and Hryhoriy Hrynko, opposed the plans of Joseph Stalin and Russian Communist leadership to reincorporate Ukraine and other Soviet republics into the Russian SFSR, and managed to persuade Lenin to preserve Ukrainian SSR as part of the newly established Soviet Union. During the 12th Congress of the Russian Communist Party (Bolsheviks) a resolution to increase the number of local party members in republics was adopted. This decision signified the beginning of Ukrainization in the Soviet Union, which reached its peak following the removal of Kviring and his replacement by Lazar Kaganovich as leader of the Communist Party of Ukraine in 1925. Simultaneously, in 1926-1928 a political purge was organized under Kaganovich's supervision against Ukrainian National Communists and Trotskyists, resulting in the expulsion of 36,000 members of the party.

Following the beginning of collectivization in 1929-1930, 26,700 members were expelled from the party in another purge. During the First Five-Year Plan, the Party took direct responsibility for collectivization of agricultural land and eventually in forced requisitions of grain that led to the deadly Holodomor. Leading figures of the Ukrainian Communist Party at the time, such as Grigory Petrovsky, Vlas Chubar and Stanisław Kosior, lobbied for the reduction of grain collection quotas by Moscow, but their petitions were rejected by the Politburo. In January 1933 Pavel Postyshev was sent to Ukraine by Stalin in order to oversee the fulfillment of government's plans, which included the purposed decimation of Ukrainian peasantry with hunger and abolition of Ukrainization policies. Protesting against the new centralization by Moscow and renewal of Russification, several notable Ukrainian Communists, including Mykola Khvylyovy and Mykola Skrypnyk, committed suicide. Mass arrests started against former members of the Borotbists and Ukrainian Communist Party. In November 1933 Postyshev declared Ukrainian nationalism, and not Russian chauvinism, to be the main enemy of the party. This declaration signified the beginning of a wave of terror against Ukrainians accused of "bourgeois nationalism". In January 1934 a political purge was performed among members of the Central Committee of the Communist Party of Ukraine. The terror campaign reached its peak in 1937-1938, as a result of which 61 of the 62 members of the Ukrainian Central Committee were eliminated.

In January 1938 Nikita Khrushchev replaced Stanisław Kosior as the First Secretary of the Communist Party of Ukraine. He was tasked by Stalin to complete the purge of Ukrainian Communists and promote further Russification. As a result of the purges, membership in the party had decreased by over a half At the same time, the share of ethnic Ukrainian party members grew significantly during the 1930s, along with the simultaneous decrease in the number of workers in its rows.

==== World War II and postwar years ====
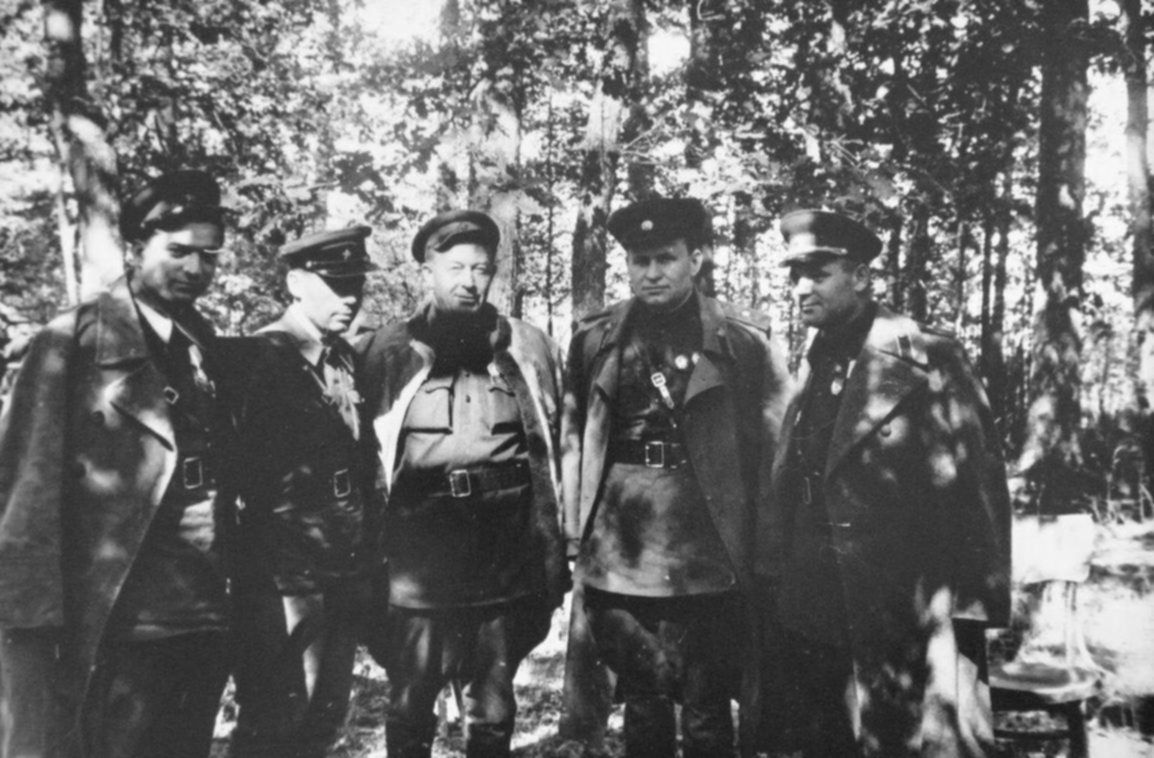
Party secretary Demian Korotchenko meeting with partisan commanders in 1943

Following the Soviet annexation of Eastern Galicia and Volhynia in November 1939 mass arrests started against Poles and Ukrainians in the annexed areas, including members of the Communist Party of Western Ukraine. In December 1939 Communist Party of Ukraine established its branches in all six oblasts of newly incorporated Western Ukraine. As of 1940, 63,1% percent of the party's members were ethnic Ukrainians, but in the Central Committee that number comprised only 40%.

During the Second World War members of the Communist Party of Ukraine organized the Soviet partisan movement in German-occupied territories. At the same time, only 2% of the partisans belonged to the party. According to orders from Khrushchev, members of the resistance were tasked with employing scorched earth tactics in Ukrainian territories. Following the expulsion of Germans from Ukraine in 1944, Central Committee of the Communist Party of Ukraine organized the suppression of the Ukrainian Insurgent Army. Between 1945 and 1949 the party's membership had grown from 200,000 to 784,000. This period was characterized by permanent purges in the party leadership. In 1946 a new campaign against "bourgeois nationalism" was initiated by Ukrainian Communists on the instruction of Stalin's deputy Andrei Zhdanov, resulting in further suppression of Ukrainian culture. During the same period, Ukraine suffered from a severe famine.

On 13 October 1952, the party was officially renamed as the Communist Party of Ukraine. Following the death of Stalin in 1953, the Central Committee of the party adopted a resolution condemning excess Russificatory practices in Western Ukraine. Russian-born Leonid Melnikov was removed from the post of First Secretary and replaced with ethnic Ukrainian Oleksiy Kyrychenko, and the economic rights of Soviet Ukraine were increased through decentralization of government. Despite this, the Communist Party of Ukraine remained under strict control from Moscow and continued to follow the centralist ideological line. The party ignored the growing protests of Ukrainian intelligentsia against Russification. By 1958, a little more than 60% of the party's members were of Ukrainian ethnicity.

Following the replacement of Nikolay Podgorny by Petro Shelest on the post of First Secretary in 1963, Russificatory policies were toned down, and a project of Ukrainization in Soviet Ukraine's educational sphere was prepared by the party leadership. However, in 1972 Shelest was removed from his post. His successor Volodymyr Shcherbytsky followed the line of absolute loyalty to the central leadership in Moscow. Under Shcherbytsky's rule, a new campaign against Ukrainian nationalism began, and the party apparatus was increasingly Russified. Brezhnev Era saw the rise of the Dnipropetrovsk clan in Ukrainian and general Soviet politics.

==== Downfall and emergence of successor organizations ====
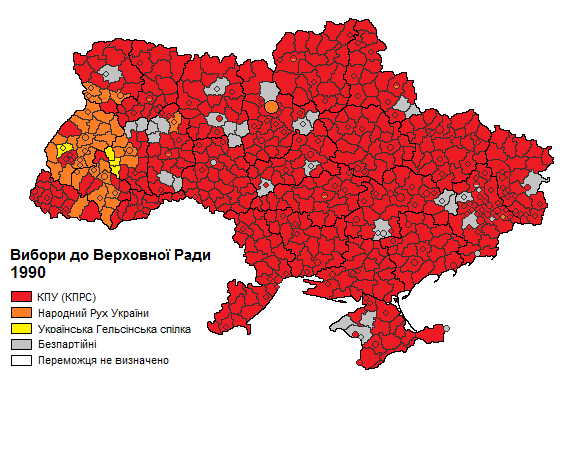
Map of the results of the 1990 Ukrainian Supreme Soviet election with districts won by Communists in red

Following the start of Perestroika, the Communist Party of Ukraine suffered a significant fall in popularity, and by 1990 its membership had decreased. One of the major events which contributed to this fall was the Chernobyl disaster, which demonstrated gross negligence of the party leadership. The Communist Party of Ukraine was at the time recognized to be among the most conservative republican branches of the Communist Party of the Soviet Union, with the whole upper echelon of nomenklatura being personal appointees of Shcherbytsky. After the latter resigned on 28 September 1989, officially due to ill health, the party started disintegrating. During the 1990 Ukrainian Supreme Soviet election, the Communist Party of Ukraine gained around 85% of seats, but many of its elected representatives started deserting the organization, joining the People's Council and other fractions. Throughout 1990, the party lost over 28,000 members. Unable to control the situation, on 22 June 1990 Volodymyr Ivashko resigned from the post of First Secretary in favour of conservative Communist Stanislav Hurenko. On 16 July members of the Communist Party of Ukraine voted for the Declaration of State Sovereignty of Ukraine. Defection of party's representatives in the Supreme Soviet continued, and by November of the same year, only a little more than half of its elected deputies remained loyal to the Communist leadership. On 24 October 1990, article 6 on the monopoly of the Communist Party of Ukraine on power was excluded from the Constitution of the Ukrainian SSR.

Following the January Events of 1991 in Lithuania, the process of disintegration in Ukrainian party nomenklatura accelerated. During the August Coup attempt in Moscow, the party's leader Hurenko supported the actions of the State Committee on the State of Emergency. However, after the coup's defeat, on 23 August the party's Politburo condemned those actions, and Hurenko himself resigned from the Central Committee. On 26 August 1991 the Verkhovna Rada of newly independent Ukraine suspended and on 30 August 1991 prohibited the Communist Party of Ukraine based on the fact that "the leadership of the Communist Party of Ukraine in its actions supported the coup d'état". As a result of these sanctions, the party fell apart in a similar way to its parent organization, the Communist Party of the Soviet Union, with its subordinate groups being reorganized into separate political entities. On 26 October 1991 the first congress of the Socialist Party of Ukraine was organized by former Communist Party fraction member Oleksandr Moroz, meanwhile a group of agrarians led by Serhiy Dovhan and Oleksandr Tkachenko formed the Peasant Party of Ukraine (SelPU). The remaining members either changed political direction or created their own left-wing parties such as the Vitrenko bloc, Social-Democratic (United) party, and others.

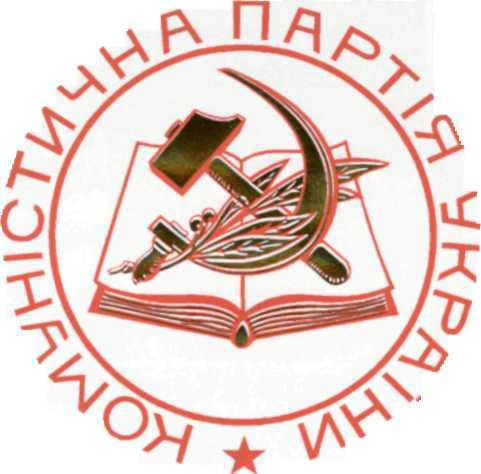
Logo of the reestablished Communist Party of Ukraine used during the 1990s

Because accusations of participation in the August Coup against the party's members couldn't be confirmed during the investigation, no member of the Communist nomenklatura in Ukraine was brought to responsibility. Many former members of the party supported Leonid Kravchuk during the 1991 Ukrainian presidential election, and were later appointed regional governors, working to prevent lustration and decommunization in the country. Due to efforts of some other communist cells across Ukraine that did not join the Socialist Party, the Communist Party of Ukraine was re-established in March 1993 at a congress in Donetsk under the leadership of Petro Symonenko, eventually joining the Union of Communist Parties – Communist Party of the Soviet Union from Moscow. Some members who had previously entered the Socialist Party, such as Adam Martyniuk, joined the party after its re-establishment. Despite this, the formal ban against the Communist Party's activities lasted until 2001, when the Constitutional Court of Ukraine recognized it to be unconstitutional, as the recreated party was not a legal successor of the Soviet-era Communist Party of Ukraine. In May 2002, members of the original Communist Party called up a congress and merged their organization into the recreated Communist Party of Ukraine. Following the 2014 Revolution of Dignity, all communist parties in the territory of Ukraine were outlawed and banned, with the ideology criminalized.

== Organizational structure ==
=== Central Committees ===
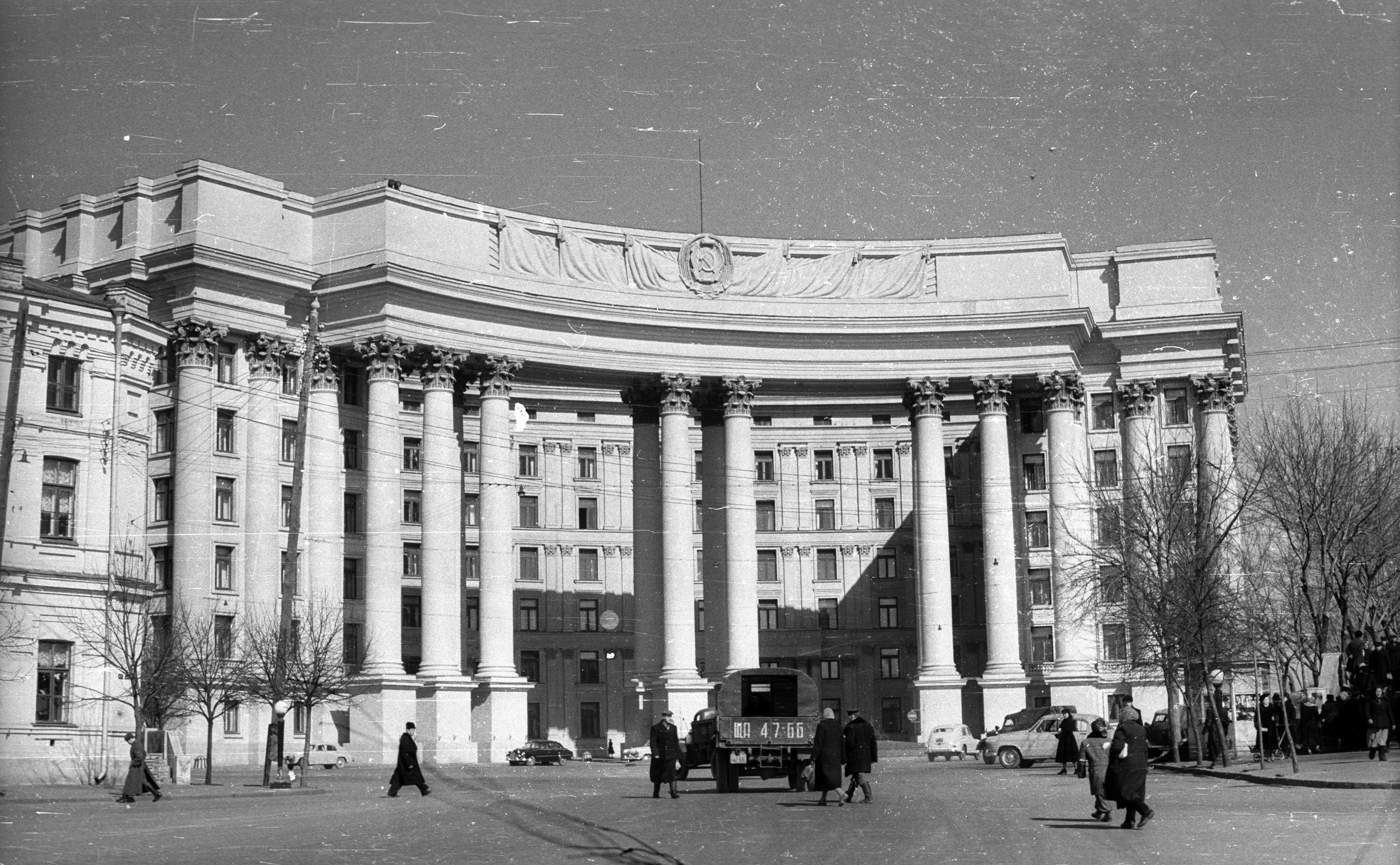
Building of Central Committee of the Communist Party of Ukraine in Kyiv (now housing the Foreign Ministry)

Initial composition of the committee was elected at the 1st party Congress on 12 July 1918 and consisted of the following people: Ivan Amosov, Andrei Bubnov, Afanasiy Butsenko, Shulim Gruzman, Vladimir Zatonsky, Lavrentiy Kartvelishvili, Emmanuil Kviring, Stanislav Kosior, Isaak Kreisberg, Yuriy Lutovinov, Yuriy Pyatakov, Rafail Farbman, Pinkhus Rovner, Leonid Tarsky (Sokolovsky), Isaak Shvarts. Beside full members there also were candidate to the committee. The initial composition included Yan Hamarnik (Yakov Pudikovich), Dmitriy Lebed, Mikhail Mayorov (Meyer Biberman), Mykola Skrypnyk, Petro Slynko, Yakov Yakovlev (Epshtein). On 9 September 1918 Mayorov and Slynko replaced Kertvelishvili and Farbman as full members, while the last two lost their membership. During World War II on 2 October 1942 there was created the Illegal Central Committee of the Party consisting of 17 members. The committee was dissolved on 29 June 1943. Among the members of the committee were such personalities as Sydir Kovpak, Leonid Korniets, Oleksiy Fedorov, and others.

=== Politburo ===
The party had its own Politburo created on 6 March 1919. On 25 September 1952, the committee was renamed into the Bureau of the Central Committee (CC) of CP(b)U, and in October the same year as the Bureau of the CC CPU. On 10 October 1952 it became the Presidium of the CC CPU. On 26 June 1966 again the bureau was finally left with its original name as the Politburo of the CC CPU. At first it consisted of five members and later another one was added. The first Politburo included Andriy Bubnov, Emanuel Kviring, Vladimir Mescheryakov, Georgiy Pyatakov, Christian Rakovsky, and later Stanislav Kosior, all centrists. From 23 March until 15 April 1920, there was elected a Provisional Bureau which the next day was ratified by the Russian Communist Party (Bolsheviks).

=== Orgburo ===
Along with Politburo the party like its Russian counterpart had its own Orgburo that was created the same day as Politburo.

== Party leader ==
The party was headed by its secretary. The position was highly influential and often was considered to be more important than the head of state (see Ukrainian SSR).

Years	Name	Remarks
1918 - 1920	Secretary of Central Committee	
1920 - 1925	First Secretary of Central Committee	
1925 - 1934	General Secretary of Central Committee	
1934 - 1991	First Secretary of Central Committee	

The following list is composed of the secretary of the Central Committee of the party who were the leaders of the Party. The position also was changing names between being called the First Secretary or the General Secretary, depending on a political atmosphere in the Soviet Union. The position was not officially of the head of state, but certainly was very influential, especially within the republic. The longest serving secretary was Vladimir Shcherbitsky with some 17 years as the head of the Communist Party, the second best is split between Stanislav Kosior and Nikita Khrushchev, both of which have 11 years.

== Party Congresses and Conferences ==
There were 28 Congresses with the last one consisting out of two stages. There also were three consolidated conferences of the party from 1926 to 1932.

=== List of the party congresses and conferences (on equal rights as congresses) ===
- 1st Congress of the Communist Party (Bolsheviks) of Ukraine — Moscow, 5—12 July 1918
- 2nd Congress of the Communist Party (Bolsheviks) of Ukraine — Moscow, 17—22 October 1918
- 3rd Congress of the Communist Party (Bolsheviks) of Ukraine — Kharkiv, 1—6 March 1919
- 4th Conference of the Communist Party (Bolsheviks) of Ukraine — Kharkiv, 17—23 March 1920
- 5th Conference of the Communist Party (Bolsheviks) of Ukraine — Kharkiv, 17—22 November 1920
- 6th All-Ukrainian Conference of the Communist Party (Bolsheviks) of Ukraine — Kharkiv, 9—14 December 1921
- 7th All-Ukrainian Conference of the Communist Party (Bolsheviks) of Ukraine — Kharkiv, 6—10 April 1923
- 8th All-Ukrainian Conference of the Communist Party (Bolsheviks) of Ukraine — Kharkiv, 12—16 May 1924
- 9th Congress of the Communist Party (Bolsheviks) of Ukraine — Kharkiv, 6—12 December 1925
- 10th Congress of the Communist Party (Bolsheviks) of Ukraine — Kharkiv, 20—29 November 1927
- 11th Congress of the Communist Party (Bolsheviks) of Ukraine — Kharkiv, 5—15 June 1930
- 12th Congress of the Communist Party (Bolsheviks) of Ukraine — Kharkiv, 18—23 January 1934
- 13th Congress of the Communist Party (Bolsheviks) of Ukraine — Kyiv, 27 May — 3 June 1937
- 14th Congress of the Communist Party (Bolsheviks) of Ukraine — Kyiv, 13—18 June 1938
- 15th Congress of the Communist Party (Bolsheviks) of Ukraine — Kyiv, 13—17 May 1940
- 16th Congress of the Communist Party (Bolsheviks) of Ukraine — Kyiv, 25—28 January 1949
- 17th Congress of the Communist Party (Bolsheviks) of Ukraine — Kyiv, 23—27 September 1952
- 18th Congress of the Communist Party of Ukraine — Kyiv, 23—26 March 1954
- 19th Congress of the Communist Party of Ukraine — Kyiv, 17—21 January 1956
- 20th Extraordinary Congress of the Communist Party of Ukraine — Kyiv, 16—17 January 1959
- 21st Congress of the Communist Party of Ukraine — Kyiv, 16—19 February 1960
- 22nd Congress of the Communist Party of Ukraine — Kyiv, 27—30 September 1961
- 23rd Congress of the Communist Party of Ukraine — Kyiv, 15—18 March 1966
- 24th Congress of the Communist Party of Ukraine — Kyiv, 17—20 March 1971
- 25th Congress of the Communist Party of Ukraine — Kyiv, 10—13 February 1976
- 26th Congress of the Communist Party of Ukraine — Kyiv, 10—12 February 1981
- 27th Congress of the Communist Party of Ukraine — Kyiv, 6—8 February 1986
- 28th Congress of the Communist Party of Ukraine — Kyiv, 19—23 June 1990 (first stage), 13—14 December 1990 (second stage)

=== List of the party conferences ===
- 1st Conference of the Communist Party (Bolsheviks) of Ukraine — Kharkiv, 17—21 October 1926
- 2nd Conference of the Communist Party (Bolsheviks) of Ukraine — Kharkiv, 9—14 April 1929
- 3rd Conference of the Communist Party (Bolsheviks) of Ukraine — Kharkiv, 6—9 July 1932

== Party newspapers ==
=== Central newspapers ===
- Silski Visti (1920–1991)
- Ukraina Moloda (1991)

=== Regional newspapers ===
- Bilshovyk Poltavshchyny (1917-1941)

== See also ==
- First Secretary of the Communist Party of Ukraine
- Handbook on history of the Communist Party and the Soviet Union 1898–1991
- Institute of History of the Party
- All-Ukrainian Congress of Soviets
