= Galician Soviet Socialist Republic =

1920 Bolshevik state in western Ukraine

Galician Soviet Socialist Republic Галицкая Социалистическая Советская Республика Galicyjska Socjalistyczna Republika Rad Галицька Соціалістична Радянська Республіка
- 1920
- Flag

- Territory where Soviet power was established in July-September 1920
- Status: Unrecognized state
- Capital: Ternopil
- Government: Revolutionary Committee (provisional)
- Chairman
  - 1920: Volodymyr Zatonsky
- Historical era: Interwar period
  - Established: 15 July 1920
  - Disestablished: 21 September 1920
Preceded by	Succeeded by
West Ukrainian People's Republic; Second Polish Republic	Second Polish Republic
- Today part of: Ukraine

The Galician Soviet Socialist Republic (Note: Russian: Галицкая Социалистическая Советская Республика, abbr. Галицкая ССР, ГССР; Ukrainian: Галицька Соціалістична Радянська Республіка, romanized: Halytska Sotsialistychna Radianska Respublika, abbr. Галицька СРР, ГСРР, Halytska SRR, HSRR; Polish: Galicyjska Socjalistyczna Republika Rad, abbr. Galicyjska SRR, GSRR) was a short-lived, self-declared Bolshevik political entity that existed from 15 July to formally 21 September 1920 with the capital in the city of Tarnopol (Ternopil). The communist state was established during a successful counter-offensive of the Red Army in the summer of 1920 as part of the Polish-Soviet War and in the course of which the Polish-Ukrainian joint military force (Polish Ukrainian Front) was forced to retreat from its positions along the Dnieper that it secured earlier in 1920 all the way to the foothills of the Carpathian Mountains.

== History ==
The republic became a buffer zone of the ongoing conflict within the area of the South-Western front of the Red Army. Due to the successful offensive in July 1920, the Soviet government also created the Polrevkom and had intentions of creating the Polish Socialist Soviet Republic. A similar, but less elaborate activity, of the communist Polrevkom, was related to the North-Western front of the Red Army (the "government" was seated in Białystok).

The Galician SSR was established on 15 July 1920 when the Galician Revolutionary Committee (Halrevkom), a revkom (provisional government) headed by Volodymyr Zatonsky (Vladimir Zatonsky) and created on 8 July in Kyiv under the auspices of the Communist Party of Bolsheviks of Ukraine (CP(b)U), issued its declaration.

The communist government moved to Tarnopol in Eastern Galicia on 1 August 1920 upon occupation of the region by the Red Army. The same day the Halrevkom adopted a decree "About establishing of Soviet power in Galicia". The national languages (of equal status) were declared to be Polish, Ukrainian and Yiddish. With its decrees, the communist government abolished private ownership of the means of production, established an eight-hour workday, separated church from state and nationalised church estates, established a single labour school with seven-year education, and nationalised the land. By the end of August, the Halrevkom tried to conduct elections to establish a permanent Soviet government and convene the All-Galician Congress of Soviets.

The Galician Socialist Soviet Republic was severely understaffed, and while released Ukrainian memoirs leave the fate of the erstwhile ZUNR officials unknown, many do mention that local educated Ukrainians worked for the Soviet administration, being afraid of what letting Poles and Jews dominating every administrative ministry would entail. Exemptions from confiscations such as from the Prodrazvyorstka, were also attractive for educated Ukrainians. Bolshevik reports claim that the Western Ukrainian population supported them out of their hatred for Petliura, whose alliance with Poland was seen as betrayal of the Galician state. However, Stephen Velychenko reports that it is yet to be determined just how many Ukrainians worked for the Soviet government, given that the prevalent opinion amongst the Ukrainian population at the time was that Polish rule would be the lesser evil. All revkoms were officially supposed to be one-half Ukrainian, one-quarter Jewish, and one-quarter Polish, but in reality the ethnicity of the ministry's head determined which language was used and which group was represented in each ministry the most. Borys Kolodii, a clerk in the War Commissariat, described how every official would assign positions to their co-nationals and then impose either Polish or Ukrainian as the de facto office language. The republic’s education and economy staff, as well as the local military district leaders, were overwhelmingly Polish Jews who used Polish as the official language. The Soviet Union had granted Eastern Galicia to Communist Poland as a province - Ukrainian Communists who wanted Galicia to be part of Soviet Ukraine were a minority, and contemporary reports claimed that Poles dominated the Galician revkoms. The majority of Polish Bolsheviks were from former Congress Poland and wished Galicia to be annexed to a Communist Poland in its entirety. While the Ukrainian staff had to follow the official regulation and operate in all three languages, the Poles and Jews ignored it and used only Polish without any consequences.

With the Polish offensive on 15 September, those plans failed and the Halrevkom withdrew from Tarnopol. On 21 September 1920, the republic was officially abolished and its revolutionary committee was transformed into the Galician Bureau of the Central Committee of the Communist Party of Ukraine. With the signing of the Peace of Riga in March 1921, the bureau was liquidated.

Halrevkom did not control the most important area of East Galicia: the Lviv area with its oilfields of Boryslav and Drohobych.

== Government composition ==
- Volodymyr Zatonsky – chairman
- Mykhailo Baran – deputy chairman
- Fedir Konar – head of departments of justice and interior
- Kazimierz Litwinowicz – secretary
- Ivan Nemolovsky – commissar of finances (later head of the department of railways)
- Myroslav Havryliv – commissar of enlightenment
- Mykhailo Kozoris – commissar of courts
- Omelyan Paliiv – commissar of military
- Ivan Siyak – secretary of the Sovnarkom (Council of commissars)
