= First Secretary of the Communist Party of Ukraine =

De facto leader of the Ukrainian Soviet Socialist Republic

First Secretary of the Central Committee of the Communist Party of Ukraine
- Russian: Первый Секретарь ЦК КПУ; Ukrainian: Перший Секретар ЦК КПУ
- Emblem of the Ukrainian Soviet Socialist Republic

- Final officeholder Stanislav Hurenko; 23 June 1990 – 30 August 1991
- Central Committee of the Communist Party of Ukraine
- Style: Comrade First Secretary
- Status: Party leader (republican level)
- Member of: Politburo; Secretariat; Central Committee of the Communist Party of the Soviet Union
- Residence: Bankova Street
- Seat: Kyiv, Ukrainian SSR
- Appointer: Central Committee of the Communist Party of Ukraine
- Constituting instrument: Party statutes
- Formation: Secretary of the Organizational Bureau: 20 April 1918; Secretary: 12 July 1918; First Secretary: 23 November 1920; General Secretary: 20 March 1925 – 23 January 1934
- First holder: Mykola Skrypnyk as Secretary of the Organizational Bureau; Georgy Pyatakov as First Secretary
- Final holder: Stanislav Gurenko as First Secretary
- Abolished: 30 August 1991
- Succession: Liquidated and banned due to support for the State Committee on the State of Emergency; President of Ukraine
- Deputy: Second Secretary of the Communist Party of Ukraine

The First Secretary of the Central Committee of the Communist Party of Ukraine (Ukrainian: Перший Секретар ЦК КПУ, romanized: Pershyi Sekretar TsK KPU, Russian: Первый Секретарь ЦК КПУ) was a party leader of the Ukrainian republican branch of the Communist Party of the Soviet Union. The office's name alternated throughout its history between First Secretary and the General Secretary.

The secretary was the de facto leader of the Ukrainian Soviet Socialist Republic through Article 6 of the Soviet Constitution, which made the Communist Party of the Soviet Union the "leading and guiding force of the Soviet society". These powers were revoked with the revision to Article 6 on 24 October 1990 that removed the Communist Party's monopoly on power.

The First Secretary was elected at a plenum (plenary session) of the Central Committee, while each Central Committee of the Communist Party of Ukraine was elected at the each Party's Congress. The longest serving secretary was Volodymyr Shcherbytsky with some 17 years.

== Name change ==
- 1918–1920 Secretary of the Central Committee of the Communist Party of Ukraine
- 1920–1921 First Secretary of the Central Committee of the Communist Party of Ukraine
- 1921–1921 Responsible Secretary of the Central Committee of the Communist Party of Ukraine
- 1921–1925 First Secretary of the Central Committee of the Communist Party of Ukraine
- 1925–1934 General Secretary of the Central Committee of the Communist Party of Ukraine
- 1934–1991 First Secretary of the Central Committee of the Communist Party of Ukraine

== Historical scope ==
The post of Secretary was elected by a plenum (plenary session) of the Central Committee of the Communist Party of Ukraine beginning since July 1918. Until 1920 it was a single post of the Central Committee Secretariat. In 1920 Nikolay Bestchetvertnoi was dismissed as the secretary and the Provisional Bureau of the Central Committee elected Stanislav Kosior as the Party's Secretary.

Later in 1920 there were introduced a post of the Second Secretary which acted as a deputy of the First Secretary. In 1921 after Vyacheslav Molotov was dismissed as the First Secretary, he was replaced with Feliks Kon as the Responsible Secretary. Kon became the only party official with such title which he held until end of 1921. Starting with 1921 beside the First and the Second secretaries, there were elected some additional secretaries, first of which became Stanislav Kosior.

In March 1925 on a statement of the Central Committee of the Communist Party of Ukraine the post held by Emanuil Kviring had changed its name to the General Secretary. Less than a month later a plenum of the Central Committee of the Communist Party of Ukraine reelected the party's leader Lazar Kaganovich with the new title name. In January of 1934 Stanislav Kosior was elected as the First Secretary returning to previous name which has been kept until the dissolution of the Soviet Union.

From 1927 to 1930, the Communist Party of Ukraine also had posts of a candidate to Secretariat members. Between 1931 and 1932 there were secretaries for specific types of industry as well as a separate secretary for the Donbas (Ivan Akulov). In June of 1937 there was introduced a post of the Third Secretary which existed until January of 1949. In May of 1940 a practice of electing a secretary for specifically assigned industry was renewed and continued throughout the World War II until the next planum of the Central Committee of the Communist Party of Ukraine in January of 1949.

Until 1952 the Communist Party of Ukraine was officially known as the Communist Party (Bolsheviks) of Ukraine (CP(b)U).

== List of first and second secretaries ==
- Mykola Oleksiiovych Skrypnyk (20 April–26 May 1918) (Secretary of the Organizational Bureau)

No.	Portrait	Name (Born-Died)	Term of office			Second	Congress
No.	Portrait	Name (Born-Died)	Took office	Left office	Time in office	Second	Congress
1	Georgy Pyatakov	Georgy Pyatakov (1890–1937)	12 July 1918	9 September 1918	59 days	None	1
2	Serafima Hopner	Serafima Hopner (1880–1966)	9 September 1918	22 October 1918	43 days	None	1
3	Emanuel Kviring	Emanuel Kviring (1888–1937)	23 October 1918	6 March 1919	134 days	None	2
(1)	Georgy Pyatakov	Georgy Pyatakov (1890–1937)	6 March 1919	30 May 1919	85 days	None	3
4	Stanislav Kosior	Stanislav Kosior (1889–1939)	30 May 1919	10 December 1919	194 days	None	3
–	Rafail Farbman	Rafail Farbman (1893–1966); Acting	10 December 1919	23 March 1920	104 days	None	3
5	Nikolay Bestchetvertnoi	Nikolay Bestchetvertnoi (1895–1937)	23 March 1920	25 March 1920	2 days	None	4
–	Stanislav Kosior	Stanislav Kosior (1889–1939); Acting	25 March 1920	17 October 1920	206 days	None	4
6	Vyacheslav Molotov	Vyacheslav Molotov (1890–1986)	23 November 1920	22 March 1921	119 days	Dmitriy Lebed	5
–	Feliks Kon	Feliks Kon (1864–1941); Acting	22 March 1921	13 December 1921	266 days	Dmitriy Lebed	5
7	Dmitry Manuilsky	Dmitry Manuilsky (1883–1959)	14 December 1921	10 April 1923	1 year, 117 days	Dmitriy Lebed	6
(3)	Emanuel Kviring	Emanuel Kviring (1888–1937)	10 April 1923	7 April 1925	1 year, 362 days	Dmitriy Lebed; Aleksei Medvedev; Ivan Klimenko	7; 8
8	Lazar Kaganovich	Lazar Kaganovich (1893–1991)	7 April 1925	14 July 1928	3 years, 98 days	Ivan Klimenko; Aleksei Medvedev	8; 9; 10
(4)	Stanislav Kosior	Stanislav Kosior (1889–1939)	14 July 1928	27 January 1938	9 years, 197 days	Aleksei Medvedev; Lavrentiy Kartvelishvili; Vasiliy Stroganov; Mendel Khatayevich; Pavel Postyshev; Mendel Khatayevich; Sergei Kudryavtsev	10; 11; 12; 13
–	Nikita Khrushchev	Nikita Khrushchev (1894–1971); Acting	27 January 1938	18 June 1938	142 days	Mykhailo Burmystenko (Acting)	13
9	Nikita Khrushchev	Nikita Khrushchev (1894–1971)	18 June 1938	3 March 1947	8 years, 258 days	Demyan Korotchenko	13; 14
(8)	Lazar Kaganovich	Lazar Kaganovich (1893–1991)	3 March 1947	26 December 1947	298 days	Demyan Korotchenko	15
(9)	Nikita Khrushchev	Nikita Khrushchev (1894–1971)	26 December 1947	16 December 1949	1 year, 355 days	Leonid Melnikov	15; 16
10	Leonid Melnikov	Leonid Melnikov (1906–1981)	16 December 1949	4 June 1953	3 years, 170 days	Aleksei Kirichenko	16; 17
11	Alexei Kirichenko	Alexei Kirichenko (1908–1975)	4 June 1953	26 December 1957	4 years, 205 days	Nikolai Podgorny	17; 18; 19
12	Nikolai Podgorny	Nikolai Podgorny (1903–1983)	26 December 1957	2 July 1963	5 years, 188 days	Leontiy Naidek; Ivan Kazanets	19; 20; 21
13	Petro Shelest	Petro Shelest (1908–1996)	2 July 1963	25 May 1972	8 years, 328 days	Nikolai Sobol; Oleksandr Liashko; Ivan Lutak	21; 22; 23
14	Volodymyr Shcherbytsky	Volodymyr Shcherbytsky (1918–1990)	25 May 1972	28 September 1989	17 years, 95 days	Ivan Lutak; Ivan Sokolov; Oleksiy Titarenko; Vladimir Ivashko	23; 24; 25; 26
15	Vladimir Ivashko	Vladimir Ivashko (1932–1994)	28 September 1989	23 June 1990	299 days	Stanislav Hurenko	27
16	Stanislav Hurenko	Stanislav Hurenko (1936–2013)	23 June 1990	30 August 1991	1 year, 68 days	Leonid Kravchuk; Hryhoriy Kharchenko	28

== Other members of Secretariat ==
=== Third Secretary ===
- Nikolay Popov (3 June 1937 – 3 July 1937)
- Demyan Korotchenko (22 July 1939 – 9 July 1946)
- Konstantin Litvin (10 July 1946 – 28 January 1949)

=== Other Secretaries ===
- Stanislav Kosior (14 December 1921 – 17 October 1922)
- Dmitry Lebed (November 1920 – May 1924)
- Yakov Drobnis (17 October 1922 – 10 April 1923)
- Mikhail Vladimirsky (17 May 1924 – 12 December 1925)
- Boris Kholyavskiy (17 May 1924 – 5 April 1925)
- Aleksandr Shumsky (17 May 1924 – 12 December 1925)
- Fyodor Kornyushin (7 April 1925 – 24 November 1926)
- Vladimir Zatonsky (12 December 1925 – 24 February 1927)
- Kuprian Kirkizh (12 December 1925 – 24 November 1926)
- Ivan Klimenko (12 December 1925 – 13 October 1927)
- Pavel Postyshev (24 November 1926 – 22 July 1930)
- Aleksei Medvedev (28 October 1927 – 18 November 1929)
- Afanasiy Lyubchenko (29 November 1927 – 13 June 1934)
- Lavrentiy Kartvelishvili (21 November 1929 – 15 June 1930)
- Roman Terekhov (22 July 1930 – 5 January 1933)
- Vladimir Chernyavskiy (13 December 1930 – 28 January 1932; in transport)
- Nikita Alekseyev (30 November 1931 – 28 January 1932; in supply)
- Fyodor Zaitsev (28 January 1932 – 8 June 1933; in transport)
- Naum Golod (July 1932 – 8 June 1933; in supply)
- Ivan Akulov (12 October 1932 – 18 November 1933; in Donbass)
- Mendel Khatayevich (29 January 1933 – 23 January 1934)
- Nikolay Popov (27 February 1933 – 3 June 1937)
- Moisei Spivak (17 May 1940 – 21 January 1944; in human resources)
- Iosif Lysenko (17 May 1940 – 1941; in propaganda and political agitation (went missing))
- Aleksei Stoyantsev (7 May 1941 – 1943; in aviation industry)
- Ivan Vivdychenko (7 May 1941 – 1943; in engineering)
- Ivan Gorobets (7 May 1941 – 1943; in metallurgy industry)
- Aleksei Kirichenko (7 May 1941 – 21 January 1944; in industry)
- Pyotr Zakharov (7 May 1941 – 1943; in construction and construction materials)
- A. Nikolayenko (7 May 1941 – 1943; in transport)
- Pyotr Matsuy (7 May 1941 – 1943; in power stations and power industry)
- Aleksei Kirichenko (21 January 1944 – July 1945; in human resources)
- Konstantin Litvin (6 October 1944 – 9 July 1946; in propaganda and political agitation)
- Aleksei Yepishev (10 July 1946 – 28 January 1949; in human resources)
- Ivan Nazarenko (10 July 1946 – 25 May 1948; in propaganda and political agitation)
- Demian Korotchenko (3 March 1947 – 26 December 1947; in industry)
- Nikolay Patolichev (3 March 1947 – 21 July 1947; in agriculture and procurement)
- Leonid Melnikov (21 July 1947 – 26 December 1947)
- Konstantin Litvin (28 January 1949 – 13 April 1950)
- Ivan Nazarenko (28 January 1949 – 25 June 1956)
- Zinoviy Serdyuk (28 January 1949 – May 1952)
- Grigoriy Grishko (28 February 1951 – 27 September 1952)
- Nikita Bubnovskiy (May 1952 – 27 September 1952)
- Nikita Bubnovskiy (26 March 1954 – 26 March 1963)
- Olga Ivaschenko (25 May 1954 – 8 January 1965)
- Stepan Chervonenko (26 June 1956 – 22 October 1959)
- Leontiy Naidek (4 December 1957 – 26 December 1957)
- Vladimir Scherbitskiy (4 December 1957 – 17 May 1961)
- Andrei Skaba (24 October 1959 – 29 March 1968)
- Anton Gayevoy (19 May 1961 – 3 July 1962; died in office)
- Pyotr Shelest (11 August 1962 – 1 July 1963)
- Ivan Grushetskiy (25 December 1962 – 18 March 1966)
- Vasiliy Komyakhov (25 December 1962 – 16 October 1966; died in office)
- Aleksandr Lyashko (1 July 1963 – 18 March 1966)
- Vasiliy Drozdenko (18 March 1966 – 20 March 1971)
- Aleksei Titarenko (18 March 1966 – 22 October 1982)
- Ivan Lutak (23 January 1967 – 19 June 1969)
- Fyodor Ovcharenko (29 March 1968 – 10 October 1972)
- Nikolay Borisenko (31 March 1970 – 8 May 1980; died in office)
- Yakov Pogrebnyak (20 March 1971 – 24 March 1987)
- Valentin Malanchuk (10 October 1972 – 26 April 1979)
- Aleksandr Kapto (26 April 1979 – 8 February 1986)
- Ivan Mozgovoy (28 May 1980 – 10 October 1988)
- Boris Kachura (22 October 1982 – 23 June 1990)
- Vasiliy Kryuchkov (21 September 1984 – 12 December 1988)
- Vladimir Ivashko (8 February 1986 – 25 April 1987)
- Stanislav Gurenko (25 March 1987 – 18 October 1989)
- Yuriy Yelchenko (25 April 1987 – 23 June 1990)
- Ivan Grintsov (11 October 1988 – until the party's liquidation)
- Leonid Kravchuk (18 October 1989 – 28 September 1990)
- Valentin Ostrozhinskiy (23 June 1990 – until the party's liquidation)
- Anatoliy Savchenko (23 June 1990 – until the party's liquidation)
- Vasiliy Lisovenko (15 April 1991 – until the party's liquidation)

=== Candidates to the Secretariat ===
- Nikolay Donenko (9 April 1929 – 18 November 1929)
- Olga Pilatskaya (9 April 1929 – 15 June 1930)
- Andrei Khvylia (9 April 1929 – 15 June 1930)
- Vladimir Chernyavskiy (21 November 1929 – 15 June 1930)
