= Pinkhus Rovner =

Ukrainian revolutionary (1875–1919)

- Born: 1875; Mykolaiv
- Died: 1919 (aged 43–44); Podilsk
- Other name: Akim Rovner

Pinkhus Lazarovich Rovner (Ukrainian: Пінхус Ровнер, Russian: Пинхус Лазарович Ровнер; 1875–1919) was a Ukrainian Bolshevik revolutionary. He also was known under his party aliases Akim Rovner or Akimov of Nikolayev. During the struggle of Bolsheviks with the Denikin's forces (Armed Forces of South Russia) in March-April of 1919, he was a member of the Organizational Bureau of the Central Committee of the Communist Party (Bolsheviks) of Ukraine. He also was one of the founding members of the Communist Party of Ukraine being a participant of the 1st Congress of the Communist Party (Bolsheviks) of Ukraine and the 3rd Congress of the Communist Party (Bolsheviks) of Ukraine.

== Biography ==
Born in to a Jewish family in 1875, the native of Mykolaiv, Pinkhus Lazarevych Rovner was a worker at one of the Mykolaiv shipbuilding factories. In 1902, he joined the workers' movement and in the next year became a member of the RSDLP. In 1903, the gendarmerie of Mykolaiv opened a file on him when a 32-year-old mechanic, Rovner, was arrested for spreading illegal literature and being a member of the RSDLP. On 6 August 1906, Rovner was detained again among 13 other participants of the meeting at 20 First Cartwright Street in Mykolaiv. After three months of arrest he was exiled to Olonets Governorate.

In 1908, Rovner returned to Mykolaiv along with Filipp Andreev, Ivan Chigrin and other Bolsheviks to reestablish the RSDLP(b) committee in the city. From September 1908, along with Andreev he published the underground newspaper Struggle with a circulation of 5,000 copies, releasing a total of four issues of the newspaper. The newspaper was printed at a well conspired typography "Manya" located underground of the Petrov's brothers estate on the 11th Military Street.

Akim was freed by the 1917 February Revolution out of his last exile to Yenisei Governorate, after which he moved to Petrograd and soon thereafter back home to Mykolaiv. In March 1918, Rovner participated in a local uprising after extinguishing of which most members of the local RSDLP(b) had perished. On 12 July 1918, he joined the Communist Party (bolsheviks) of Ukraine, becoming a member of its central committee.

With the advance of the Armed Forces of South Russia, the Red Army lost several key cities such as Kharkiv and Katerynoslav in June 1919, while the Volunteer Army continued its advance into two main strategic directions: one - Kiev, another - Mykolaiv and Odessa. On 7 July 1919, the Council of Workers' and Peasants' Defense announced the above-mentioned cities in a state of siege, while the Communist Party of Ukraine sent special commissioners Pinkhus Rovner and Isaak Shvarts to prepare a defense. In August 1919, however the Red Army units were defeated near Kherson and Mykolaiv by the Russian General Nikolai Shilling. Some units managed to retreat to Odessa where they became surrounded by the advancing White Guards and armed forces of the Ukrainian People's Republic. On 18 August 1919, Denikin's forces occupied Mykolaiv. Handbooks of the Soviet epoch stated that on 15 August 1919 the city party committee instructed Ivan Chigirin and Akim to leave for Odessa and hand over party documents to the Odessa regional party committee. After accomplishing the mission both Chigin and Rovner became available to revolutionary military council of the 11th Army (Red Army) which fought the Ukrainian People's Army. Chigirin and Rovner heroically perished in one of the battles.

== Controversy on money embezzlement ==
A collection of materials on history of the revolutionary movement in Central Ukraine "Years of Struggle" was published in Zinovyevsk in November 1927 where I. Radionov, an active participant of the revolutionary events, recalled: "At that time Akim has arrived from the Central Committee. He found the work of revolutionary committee satisfactory and stated that the only obstacle is the lack of funds. He left 50,000 rubles of his 100,000 available for the Odessa Military Revolutionary Committee for the Lyzavethrad Military Revolutionary Committee (VRK). Lyzavethrad VRK faced a lot of work to organize partisan units and to prepare them for an armed takeover which all that required a huge amount of money. Shortly after the departure of Akim, Mogilevsky has arrived..." The modern Ukrainian historian, writer and ethnographer Victor A. Savchenko wrote in his book "The civil war adventurers: historian investigation": "In Odessa State Archives I discovered a sensational materials of embezzlement of money of the 3rd Ukrainian Soviet Army by wives of the Soviet commanders and party functionaries". He cites a number of examples and further: "About one million rubles and jewelry routed also into the hands of comrades, the Odessa party functioniers Akim and Chigrin. In September 1919, they disappeared with the money. Perhaps, they left for Europe through Romania."

== Legacy ==
Pinkhus Rovner has also been mentioned as Akim Rovner in several works about the so called Russian Civil War of 1919-1920.

- Voronsky, A. "Heroic novellas" (Героические новеллы) Heroic novellas (in Russian). www.booksite.ru
- Years of struggle. Collection of materials in history of the revolutionary movement in Zinovyevsk region (Годы борьбы. Сборник материалов по истории революционного движения на Зиновьевщине). Годы борьбы. Сборник материалов по истории революционного движения на Зиновьевщине. militera.lib.ru; Годы борьбы. Сборник материалов по истории революционного движения на Зиновьевщине. old.library.kr.ua

== See also ==
- 1919 Soviet invasion of Ukraine
- Odessa Operation (1919)
- Military Revolutionary Committee
