= Institute of History of the Party (Ukraine) =

Soviet research institute

Institute of History of the Party was a research institution of the Central Committee of the Communist Party of Ukraine and one of 16 branches of the Institute of Marxism-Leninism (IML) that existed in the Soviet Union. The institute was active in 1929–1991 and later in its place was created a research institution of the National Academy of Sciences of Ukraine, the Institute of political and ethnonational researches (since 1998), while its archives were transformed into the Central State Archive of public organizations of Ukraine.

== Directors ==
- 1922–1930 Mykola Skrypnyk (as the Institute of the Party, Istpart)
- 1930–1933 Aleksandr Shlikhter (as the Institute of History of the Party and the October Revolution)

== See also ==
- Category:Kyiv Higher Party School alumni
