= Central Committee of the Communist Party of Ukraine (Soviet Union) =

Central and highest collectively ruling body

The Central Committee of the Communist Party of Ukraine was the central and the highest collectively ruling body of the Communist Party of Ukraine (CPU) between its party congresses. As a republican branch, it was subordinated to the Central Committee of the Communist Party of the Soviet Union (CC CPSU).

During World War II in 1942–1943, there existed the "non-legal" underground Central Committee of the Communist Party (Bolsheviks) of Ukraine.

== Overview ==
In its operations, the Central Committee was governed by the program and statue of the CPSU, decisions of the CPSU congresses, the CC CPSU plenums (plenary sessions), and the CPU congresses.

The Central Committee was elected in composition determined by a party congress. The Central Committee of the Communist Party of Ukraine included members and candidates for the Central Committee. During the elections of the Central Committee of the Communist Party of Ukraine, the principle of systematic renewal of its composition and leadership succession was observed. In case of withdrawal of members of the Central Committee, its composition was replenished from the number of candidates elected by the congress to become members of the Central Committee.

At the First Congress of the CP(b) of Ukraine, 15 members and 6 candidates were elected to the Central Committee. At the Twenty-sixth Congress of the Communist Party of Ukraine (see vol. 12, Appendix), 195 members and 93 candidates were elected to the Central Committee.

In accordance with the Statute of the Communist Party of the Soviet Union, the Central Committee of the Communist Party of Ukraine managed the activities of the Communist Party of Ukraine, carried out all work on the implementation of party policy within the Ukrainian SSR, organized the implementation of directives of the Central Committee of the Communist Party of the Soviet Union, directed and checked the activities of oblast (regional), city and district party organization, systematically listened to the reports of the regional, city and district party committees. According to the guiding principle of the organizational party structure, the principle of democratic centralism, the Central Committee reported on its activities to the congresses of the Communist Party of Ukraine and to the Central Committee of the Communist Party of the Soviet Union, systematically informed the party organizations about its work. The Central Committee of the Communist Party of Ukraine convened regular (at least once every 5 years) and extraordinary (extraordinary) congresses of the Communist Party of Ukraine in accordance with the procedure established by the Statute of the Communist Party of the Soviet Union. To discuss the most important issues on activities of the republican party organization in the period between congresses, the Central Committee of the Communist Party of Ukraine were allowed, as necessary, to convene the republican party conferences.

In the activities of the Central Committee of the Communist Party of Ukraine, the principle of collective leadership is strictly observed. Plenary meetings of the Central Committee are convened at least once every 4 months, at which the most important issues of the life and activity of the Communist Party of Ukraine, the development of the national economy, science and culture of the republic are comprehensively discussed and resolved. The issue of removal from the Central Committee of a member, a candidate for a member of the Central Committee, who has tarnished his honor and dignity, is decided at the plenum of the Central Committee of the Communist Party of Ukraine. At the plenum, a decision is also made to expel from the party a member, a candidate for a member of the Central Committee, a member of the Audit Commission of the Communist Party of Ukraine. To discuss the most important decisions of the party and to develop measures for their implementation, as well as to consider urgent issues of the life of the republic, the Central Committee convenes meetings of the active members of the republican party organization. At the plenary session of the Central Committee, the Political Bureau of the Central Committee of the Communist Party of Ukraine, the Secretariat of the Central Committee of the Communist Party of Ukraine are elected. The Central Committee approves the chairman of the Party Control Commission under the Central Committee of the Communist Party of Ukraine, heads of departments of the Central Committee, chief editors of republican party newspapers and magazines.

The Central Committee of the Communist Party of Ukraine directs the activities of all state and public organizations of the republic, conducts extensive and comprehensive organizational and political work on the mobilization of workers to carry out the tasks of communist construction. The Central Committee directs and controls the activities of the Lenin Communist Youth Union of Ukraine, relies on Komsomol organizations in the work on communist education of youth, supports and disseminates their useful initiatives. Under the direct leadership of the Central Committee of the Communist Party of Ukraine, the Central Committee of the Communist Party of Ukraine consistently and persistently implements the general line of the party, directs the activities of party, state and public organizations of the republic, and the creative initiative of the masses to implement the tasks of communist construction. First Secretary of the Central Committee of the Communist Party of Ukraine is Volodymyr Shcherbytskyi (since 1972).

== Central Committee institutions ==
- Political Bureau (Provisional Bureau, Bureau, Presidium)
- Organizational Bureau
- Executive Bureau
- Transborder Bureau and Trans-Frontlines Bureau – during occupations of Ukraine first by the Central Powers, second the Anton Denikin forces ("Armed Forces of South Russia")
- Secretariat (see First Secretary of the Communist Party of Ukraine)
- Audit Commission
- Central Control Commission
- Lenin Communist Youth Union of Ukraine
- Institute of History of the Party

== Communist Party of Ukraine congresses ==
- 1st Congress of the Communist Party (Bolsheviks) of Ukraine — Moscow, 5—12 July 1918
  - Central Committee of the 1st Congress of the Communist Party (Bolsheviks) of Ukraine
- 2nd Congress of the Communist Party (Bolsheviks) of Ukraine — Moscow, 17—22 October 1918
- 3rd Congress of the Communist Party (Bolsheviks) of Ukraine — Kharkiv, 1—6 March 1919
- 4th Conference of the Communist Party (Bolsheviks) of Ukraine — Kharkiv, 17—23 March 1920
- 5th Conference of the Communist Party (Bolsheviks) of Ukraine — Kharkiv, 17—22 November 1920
- 6th All-Ukrainian Conference of the Communist Party (Bolsheviks) of Ukraine — Kharkiv, 9—14 December 1921
- 7th All-Ukrainian Conference of the Communist Party (Bolsheviks) of Ukraine — Kharkiv, 6—10 April 1923
- 8th All-Ukrainian Conference of the Communist Party (Bolsheviks) of Ukraine — Kharkiv, 12—16 May 1924
- 9th Congress of the Communist Party (Bolsheviks) of Ukraine — Kharkiv, 6—12 December 1925
- 10th Congress of the Communist Party (Bolsheviks) of Ukraine — Kharkiv, 20—29 November 1927
- 11th Congress of the Communist Party (Bolsheviks) of Ukraine — Kharkiv, 5—15 June 1930
- 12th Congress of the Communist Party (Bolsheviks) of Ukraine — Kharkiv, 18—23 January 1934
- 13th Congress of the Communist Party (Bolsheviks) of Ukraine — Kyiv, 27 May — 3 June 1937
- 14th Congress of the Communist Party (Bolsheviks) of Ukraine — Kyiv, 13—18 June 1938
- 15th Congress of the Communist Party (Bolsheviks) of Ukraine — Kyiv, 13—17 May 1940
- 16th Congress of the Communist Party (Bolsheviks) of Ukraine — Kyiv, 25—28 January 1949
- 17th Congress of the Communist Party (Bolsheviks) of Ukraine — Kyiv, 23—27 September 1952
- 18th Congress of the Communist Party of Ukraine — Kyiv, 23—26 March 1954
- 19th Congress of the Communist Party of Ukraine — Kyiv, 17—21 January 1956
- 20th Extraordinary Congress of the Communist Party of Ukraine — Kyiv, 16—17 January 1959
- 21st Congress of the Communist Party of Ukraine — Kyiv, 16—19 February 1960
- 22nd Congress of the Communist Party of Ukraine — Kyiv, 27—30 September 1961
- 23rd Congress of the Communist Party of Ukraine — Kyiv, 15—18 March 1966
- 24th Congress of the Communist Party of Ukraine — Kyiv, 17—20 March 1971
- 25th Congress of the Communist Party of Ukraine — Kyiv, 10—13 February 1976
- 26th Congress of the Communist Party of Ukraine — Kyiv, 10—12 February 1981
- 27th Congress of the Communist Party of Ukraine — Kyiv, 6—8 February 1986
- 28th Congress of the Communist Party of Ukraine — Kyiv, 19—23 June 1990 (first stage), 13—14 December 1990 (second stage)

== Headquarters ==
Years	Photo	Building	Remarks
1922 – 1934		Building of Noble Assembly, Kharkiv	
1934 – 1938		Security Service of Ukraine building, Kyiv	
1938 – 1941		Building of Ministry of Foreign Affairs, Kyiv	
1943 – 1991		Presidential Administration Building (Kyiv)	

== Central Committee newspapers ==
- Pravda Ukrainy (Sovetskaya Ukraina 1938–1943, Pravda Ukrainy 1944–1991), Russian language newspaper
- Radyanska Ukrayina (Kommunist 1918–1926, Komunist 1926–1943, Radyanska Ukrayina 1944–1991), Ukrainian language newspaper
