= Vinnytsia Bolshevik Uprising =

Vinnytsia Bolshevik Uprising was an armed uprising of the Bolsheviks in Vinnytsia from November 10 (October 28) to November 12 (October 30) 1917 during the October Revolution.

The uprising preceded by a protest of revolutionary soldiers from quartered in Vinnytsia the 15th Reserve Infantry Regiment. On 5 November (23 October) they came out on demonstration of protest against the order of command of the Southwestern Front to dissolve the regiment.

The same day on the initiative of Bolsheviks of the Vinnytsia Soviet workers and soldiers deputies there was created a revolutionary committee (revkom) headed by a leader of local Bolsheviks Nikolai Tarnogorodsky. The revkom announced all orders of local authorities invalid without agreed upon by it. The committee also agreed not to allow departing to the frontlines the 15th Regiment and other revolutionary minded formations that were located in Vinnytsia as well as prohibited to issue arms from the military warehouses. Punitive formations that arrived to the city issued an ultimatum to the Vinnytsia Soviet: to deport the 15th Regiment to frontlines, issue arms out of warehouses for the front and arrest all Bolsheviks. The soviet rejected those requests and offered for punishers to leave the city.

Following the events in Petrograd and Kiev on 10 November (28 October) there started the uprising. Against the punishers came out Red Guards workers and various military formations (~6,000 soldiers). On 12 November (30 October) after a fierce fighting and by concentrating great military force, the counter-revolutionary command of the Southwestern Front forced the rebels to retreat out of the city. However to their help from Zhmerynka arrived two regiments of the 2nd Guards Corps that drove the punishers out of Vinnytsia. On 17 November (4 November) in the city was established the Soviet regime. According to Soviet encyclopedias, the consolidation of Soviet regime in Vinnytsia prevented the Central Rada of Ukraine that cunningly disarmed revolutionary formations and temporary occupied the city.
