= Yan Gamarnik =

Soviet general (1894–1937)

- Ян Гамарник
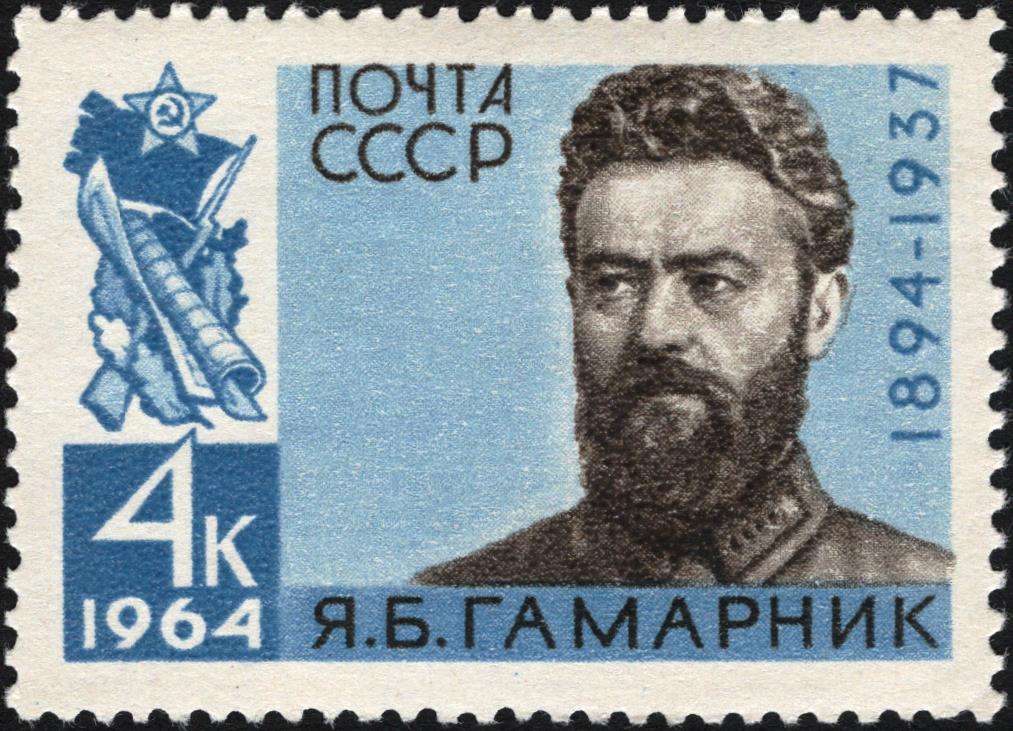
- Gamarnik on a 1964 Soviet stamp

First Secretary of the Communist Party of Byelorussia
- In office 4 December 1928 – 3 January 1930
- Preceded by: Vilgelm Knorinsh
- Succeeded by: Konstantin Gey

First Secretary of the Kyiv Regional Committee of the Communist Party of Ukraine (Bolsheviks)
- In office 25 April 1921 – July 1923
- Preceded by: Post established
- Succeeded by: Hryhoriy Hrynko

Head of the Political Directorate of the Red Workers' and Peasants' Army
- In office 1 October 1929 – 31 May 1937
- President: Kliment Voroshilov
- Preceded by: Andrei Bubnov
- Succeeded by: Pyotr Smirnov

Full member of the 15th, 16th Orgburo
- In office 17 November 1929 – 10 February 1934

Personal details
- Born: Jakov Tzudikovich Gamarnik; 14 June [O.S. 2 June] 1894 Zhytomyr, Volhynian Governorate, Russian Empire
- Died: 31 May 1937 (aged 42) Moscow, Soviet Union
- Party: CPSU (1917–1937)
- Children: Viktoria Kochneva
- Education: St Petersburg Psychoneurological Institute
- Awards: Order of the Red Banner (1928); Order of Lenin (1933)
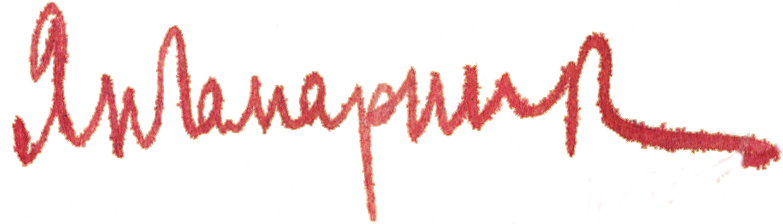
- Signature

Military service
- Allegiance: Soviet Union
- Branch/service: Army
- Years of service: 1919–1937
- Rank: Army Commissar of 1st rank
- Unit: 58th Rifle Division
- Commands: Army Political Administration (1929–37)

Yan Gamarnik (Russian: Ян Гамарник; Ukrainian: Ян Гамарнік (Гамарник), Yan Hamarnik/Hamarnyk), birth name Jakov Tzudikovich Gamarnik (Russian: Я́ков Цу́дикович Гама́рник)), sometimes known as Yakov Gamarnik (Russian: Я́ков Гама́рник; 14 June [O.S. 2 June] 1894 – 31 May 1937), was the Chief of the Political Department of the Red Army from 1930 to 1937, Deputy Commissar of Defense 1930—1934 and First Secretary of the Communist Party of Byelorussia 1928–1930.

== Biography ==
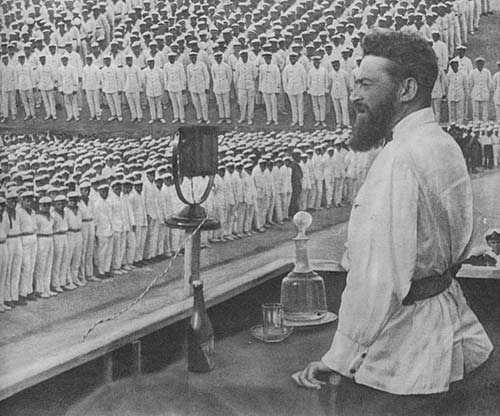
Gamarnik speaking to sailors on parade, 1933

Gamarnik was born in Zhytomyr in a Jewish family as Jakov Tzudikovich Gamarnik. He attended the St Petersburg Psychoneurological Institute and the Law School of Kiev University. In 1917 he became a member and the secretary of the Kiev Committee of the Communist Party of the Soviet Union. From 1921 to 1923 Gamarnik was a chairman of the Kiev city council. During his administration, Kiev was divided into five districts. He went through many Communist Party positions, both civil and military, e.g. a First Secretary of the Belarusian Communist Party of Belorussia from December 1928 to October 1929.

He was instrumental in preparing the 10-year development plan for the Far-Eastern region of the USSR. He was a member of the Central Committee elected by the 17th Congress of the All-Union Communist Party (Bolsheviks). He attended the Plenum of 23 February 1937.

An idealist, Gamarnik was a staunch supporter of Marshal Tukhachevsky's drive to make USSR a military superpower. In 1937 Gamarnik was accused of participating in an anti-Soviet conspiracy after the Case of Trotskyist Anti-Soviet Military Organization. The Politburo of the Soviet Communist Party ordered the decision "to remove Comrades Gamarnik and Aronshtam from their work in the People's Commissariat of Defense and to exclude them from the Military Council, as workers who were in close group ties with Yakir, who has now been expelled from the party for participation in a military-fascist conspiracy." The next day, on May 31, 1937, head of the Directorate for the Command Staff of the Red Army On May 30, 1937, the Politburo of the Central Committee of the All-Union Communist Party (Bolsheviks) made a decision: "To remove Comrades Gamarnik and Aronshtam from their work in the People's Commissariat of Defense and to exclude them from the Military Council, as workers who were in close group ties with Yakir, who has now been expelled from the party for participation in a military-fascist conspiracy."

On May 31, 1937, I.V. Smorodinov and A.S. Bulin of the People's Commissariat of Defense informed Gamarnik about the decisions of the Politburo, and told him that he was dismissed from the ranks of the Red Army. Immediately after their departure, Gamarnik shot himself on the eve of his inevitable arrest. Another explanation of his death is that Garmanik insisted on the innocence of General Mikhail Tukhachevsky's on separate charges "and was soon killed by Stalin's men." Despite his death he was added to the list of conspirators in the case of the Trotskyist Anti-Soviet Military Organization and labelled "enemy of the people".. He was rehabilitated posthumously in 1955.

== Family ==
Gamarnik's sister, Klaudia (born 1905) left school at 14, joined Komsomol in Kyiv in 1921, joined the communist party in 1927, and was working in the prosecutor's office in Moscow when she was expelled from the party on 13 June 1937, arrested on 13 August, and sentenced to eight years in labour camps. Her husband, Andrei Bogomolov, (1902–38), a secretary of the Moscow party committee, was arrested on 17 August 1937, sentenced to death on 25 April 1938, and shot the same day. They had two children, who were aged eight and two in 1937. In 1953, she appealed to have her criminal record removed, but the appeal was turned down on the grounds that she had consorted with 'enemies of the people', including her husband.

== Honours and awards ==
- Order of Lenin (22 February 1933)
- Order of the Red Banner (20 February 1928)
- The town Suchan was named Gamarnik in his honour (1932–1937)

Political offices
Preceded by Ipolit Dyakov	Mayor of Kyiv; 1921–1923	Succeeded by Hryhoriy Hrynko

== Sources ==
- Robert Conquest, The Great Terror: A Reassessment, Oxford University Press, May 1990, hardcover, ISBN 0-19-505580-2 pp 201–202;
- Several versions of Gamarnik biography
- Gamarnik in the Fleet, with photo
- Trotsky about Gamarnik and others
- Profile at Handbook on the history of the Communist Party and the Soviet Union 1898 – 1991
