= Volodymyr Zatonsky =

Ukrainian politician (1888–1938)

- Володимир Затонський
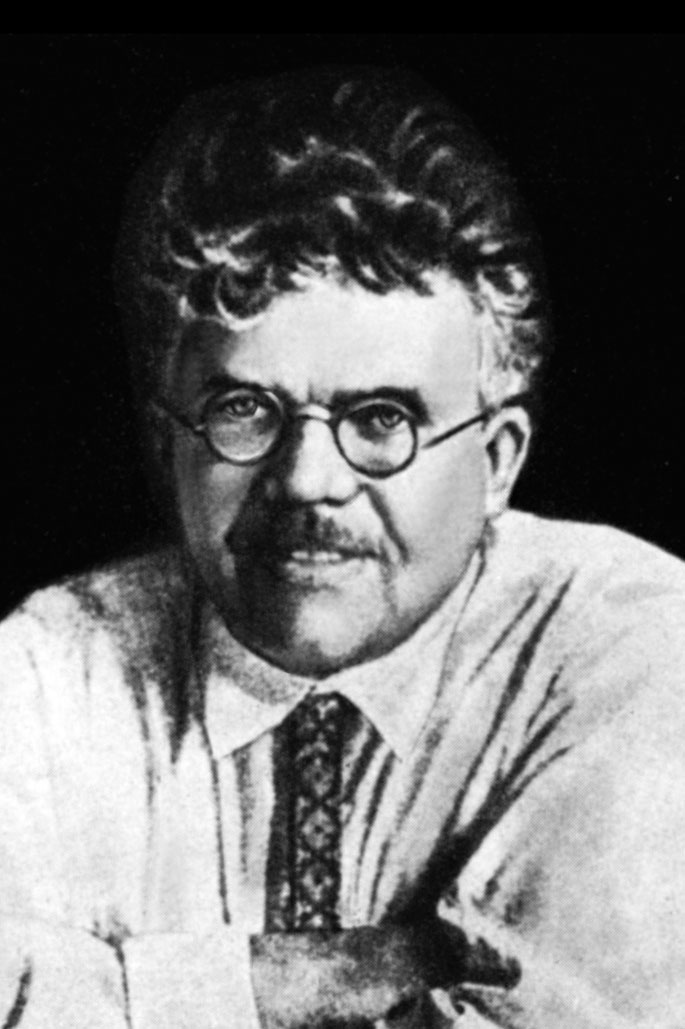
- Zatonsky in 1933

Chairman of TsVK
- In office March 19, 1918 – April 18, 1918
- Preceded by: Yukhym Medvedev
- Succeeded by: reorganized as Uprising Nine

Secretary of Education
- In office December 30, 1917 – April 18, 1918
- Prime Minister: Mykola Skrypnyk
- Preceded by: Office established
- Succeeded by: Himself (as Narkom of Education)

Narkom of Education
- In office November 28, 1918 – ?
- Prime Minister: Georgy Pyatakov; Christian Rakovsky
- Preceded by: Himself (as Secreatary of Education
- Succeeded by: ?

Chairman of Halych Revkom
- In office July 8, 1920 – September 21, 1920
- Preceded by: Office established
- Succeeded by: Office disestablished

Personal details
- Born: July 27, 1888 Lysets, Podolia Governorate, Russian Empire
- Died: July 29, 1938 (aged 50) Kyiv, Ukrainian SSR, Soviet Union
- Party: RSDLP (Mensheviks) (1905–1917); Bolshevik Party (1917–1937)
- Spouse: Olena Raskina
- Children: Dmytro Zatonsky
- Education: Kyiv University
- Awards: Order of the Red Banner

Volodymyr Petrovych Zatonsky (Ukrainian: Володи́мир Петро́вич Зато́нський; Russian: Влади́мир Петро́вич Зато́нский; July 27, 1888 – July 29, 1938) was a Ukrainian Soviet politician, academic and Communist Party activist, full member of the Ukrainian SSR Academy of Sciences (from 1929) and Academy of Sciences of the Soviet Union (from 1936). He was one of the founders of the Communist Party (Bolshevik) of Ukraine.

== Early life ==
Zatonsky was born in the village of Lysets in of Ushytsia uyezd, Podolia Governorate, Russian Empire (now in Kamianets-Podilskyi Raion, Khmelnytskyi Oblast, Ukraine) into the family of a volost pysar. In 1912 he graduated from Kyiv University, and later worked as a teacher of physics at Kyiv Polytechnic Institute.

== Political career ==
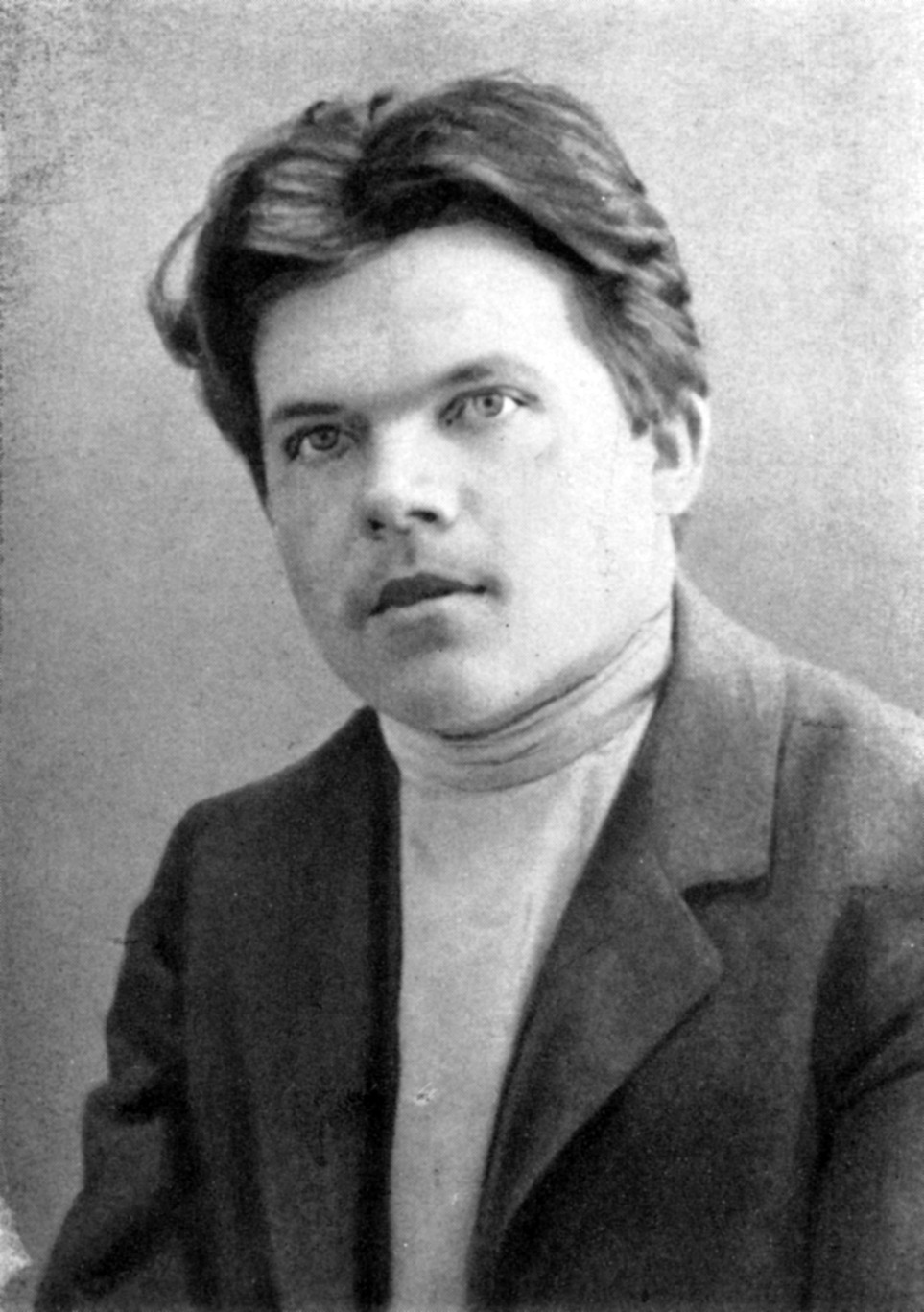
Zatonsky prior to 1912

Zatonsky joined the Russian Social Democratic Labour Party (RSDLP) party as a Menshevik in 1905. In March 1917 he joined the Bolsheviks as the member of the Kyiv Committee, later joining the Kyiv revkom as well. He was one of few who initiated the organization of the Congress of the Workers-Peasants and Soldiers deputies as well as the military coup in Kyiv. Zatonsky participated in the fight against the Central Rada.

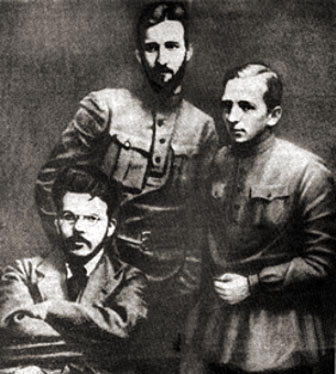
Members of the Ukrainian Military Revolutionary Committee, Volodymyr Zatonsky, Yuriy Kotsyubynsky, Andrei Bubnov, 1918

When the Red Army took over Kyiv in 1918 after the January Uprising, Zatonsky recalled that he only narrowly escaped execution as a counterrevolutionary when only Vladimir Lenin's mandate saved his life.

At the beginning of 1918 he was the Head of the Ukrainian delegation from the Ukrainian People's Republic of Soviets for the Brest-Litovsk Peace Conference. From March 19 to April 18, 1918, he was Chairman of the All-Ukrainian Central Executive Committee. In July 1918 he was a commissar of a strike force against the Left Socialist-Revolutionary rebellion in Moscow. He also represented the Ukrainian Soviet government in Russian Sovnarkom and was a member of the Foreign Bureau of the Central Committee of the Communist Party of Ukraine.

Beginning in November 1918 Zatonsky was the Narkom of People's Education. While on that post, he did everything in his power to shut down the Kamyanets-Podilsky State University as the concentration of the counter-revolutionary forces of Symon Petliura. From 1968 to 1997 the institute was named after Zatonsky. He personally was offered a position by Lenin as a representative of the Soviet Ukrainian People's Republic in the Russian SFSR.

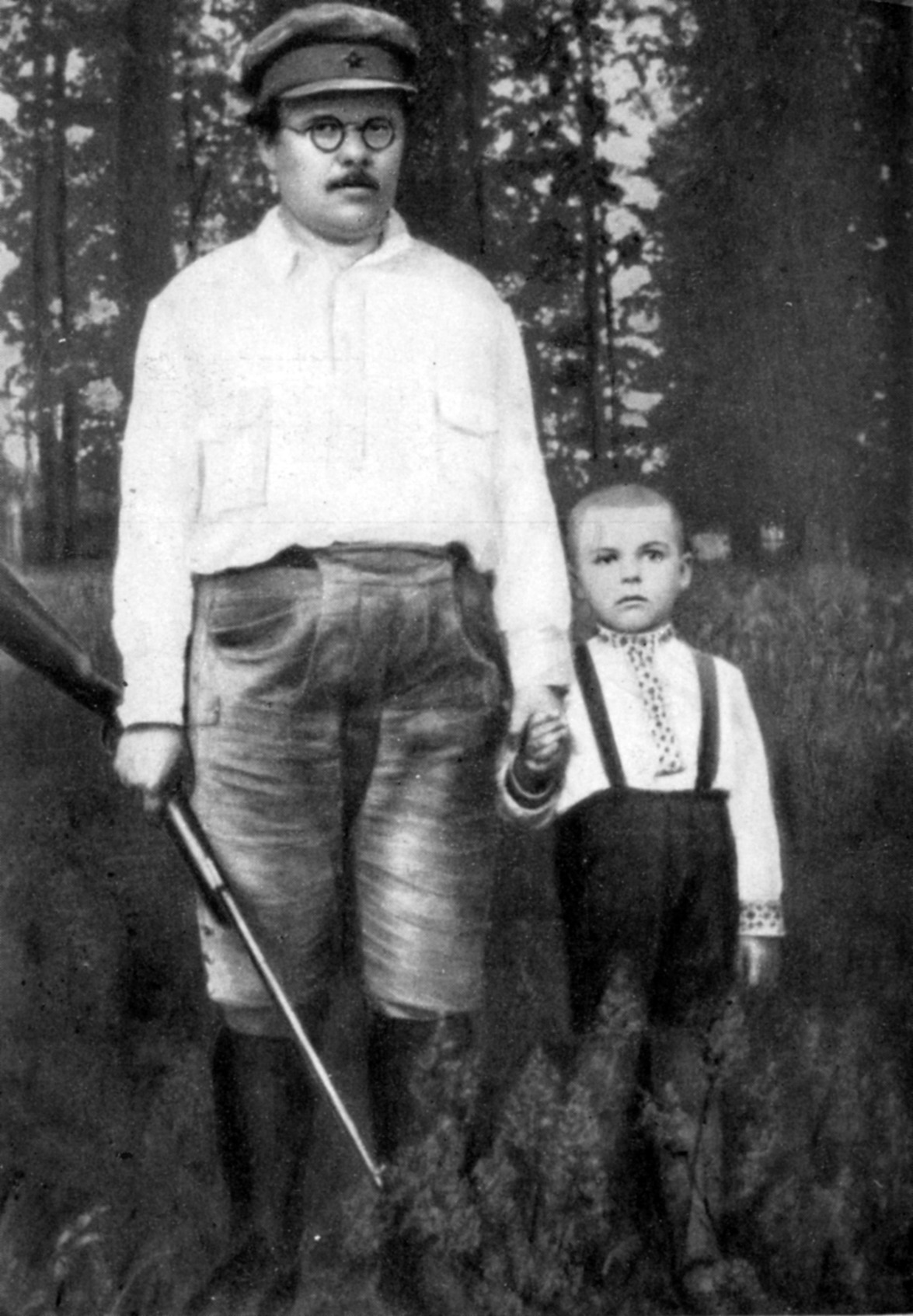
Zatonsky on a hunting trip with his son, 1928

On November 17–30, 1918, Zatonsky, Vladimir Antonov-Ovseyenko and Joseph Stalin became members of the Revolutionary Military Council (RMC) of the Special Group of Kursk Troops. The RMC developed a military-strategic plan for the liberation of Ukraine, and began to staff the front with troops. The headquarters of the formation was located in Kursk. From November 30, 1918, Zatonsky was a member of the RMC of the Ukrainian Soviet Army. In 1920 Zatonsky was chairman of Galrevkom. In 1921 he received the Order of the Red Banner for the suppression of the Kronshtadt mutiny.

Between 1921 and 1923 Zatonsky headed the Ukoopspilka. In 1922 he was one of the persons who signed for the establishment of the Union of Soviet Socialist Republics as the representative of the Ukrainian SSR. In 1923 he once again served as head of Soviet Ukraine's education ministry, and between 1924 and 1926 presided over the political directorate of the Ukrainian Military District. In 1927-1932 he took the post of People's Commissar of Workers' and Pesants' Inspection of Ukrainian SSR, and in 1933 replaced Mykola Skrypnyk as secretary for education. In September 1933 Zatonsky was appointed chief editor of the Ukrainian Soviet Encyclopedia. After 8 years of absence, in 1934 he returned to the Central Committee of the Communist Party of Ukraine, and was a candidate for membership in the Central Committee of the Communist Party of the Soviet Union.

== Arrest and death ==
On November 3, 1937, Zatonsky was arrested in a movie theater while he was with his family. Later the authorities conducted an unsanctioned search of his apartment, looking for proof of him being a spy for "bourgeois" Poland. After several days, his wife was arrested as well. Zatonsky was charged with being a member of an anti-Soviet "Ukrainian National Center". This was despite him being loyal to Stalin and not belonging to any movements of national direction inside of the party. On July 29, 1938, he was convicted after a 20-minute-long trial and sentenced to 10 years in prison without right of correspondence. During the Great Purge this was a euphemism for a death sentence, and the same day he was executed by firing squad. In 1956 Zatonsky, along with many others, was posthumously rehabilitated.

== Family ==
Wife, from 1915: Elena Samoylovna Zatonskaya, née Raskina (1888–?), a physician. She was the first president of the Ukrainian Psychoneurological Academy (UPNA), serving from the academy’s founding in 1932 until the members of the Ukrainian government and their families moved to Kyiv in 1934. From 1934 to 1937, she headed the Ukrainian Research Institute of Traumatology and Orthopedics. She was arrested in 1937.

The family had two children, a son and a daughter.

Son: Dmitry Vladimirovich Zatonsky (1922–2009), a well-known Ukrainian literary scholar and academician of the National Academy of Sciences of Ukraine.

Preceded by Mykola Khvylovy	Director of Chervony Shliach; 1927–1936	Succeeded by Position abolished
