= Isaak Kreisberg =

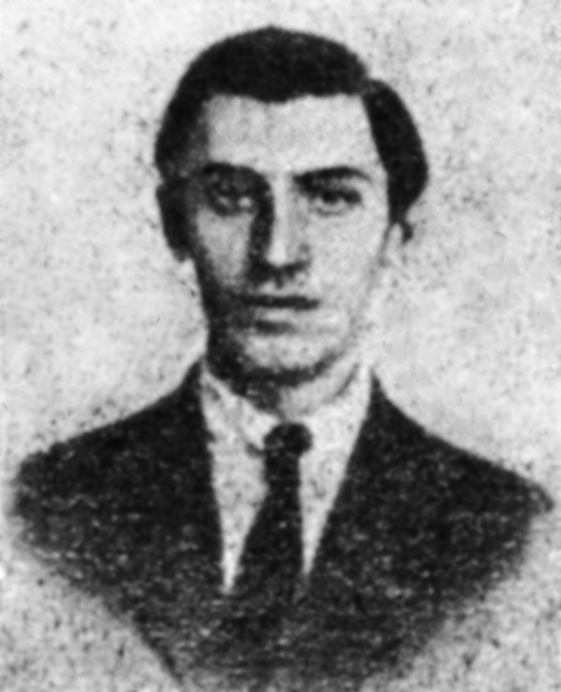
Isaak Kreisberg

Isaak Mironovich Kreisberg (Ukrainian: Ісак Миронович Крейсберг) was a Soviet political figure of Ukraine.

Born in 1898 in Kiev, Kreisberg was taking part in a revolutionary movement since 1912. In 1914 he joined the RSDLP and in 1915 was arrested and given three years of katorga (correctional labor) in arrest-companies of Kiev (released after the February Revolution). In March 1917 Kreisberg was elected to secretary of Kiev committee of RSDLP(b) and in April - June 1917 he was a member of the Southwestern regional committee of RSDLP(b) and executive committee of the Kiev council of workers' deputies.

On October 27, 1917 Kreisberg became a member of the Kiev Revolutionary Committee. Next day he was arrested, but later released. On January 15, 1918 Kreisberg once again became a member of the Kiev Military Revolutionary Committee and participated in fighting against the Ukrainian forces. With establishment of Soviet power in the city, in January - February 1918 he was a people's commissar of Kiev and a deputy of people's secretary of finance. In 1918 Kreisberg participated in underground revolutionary committee of Odessa and one of uprising leaders in Katerynoslav on December 28, 1918. Kreisberg was a member of the central committee of Communist Party (bolsheviks) of Ukraine at the 1st and 2nd party congresses. In January 1919 he participated in the peasant congress of Poltava Governorate, but was arrested by members of White movement faction and shot on January 16, 1919.
