= First All-Ukrainian Congress of Soviets (Kharkiv) =

1917 congress

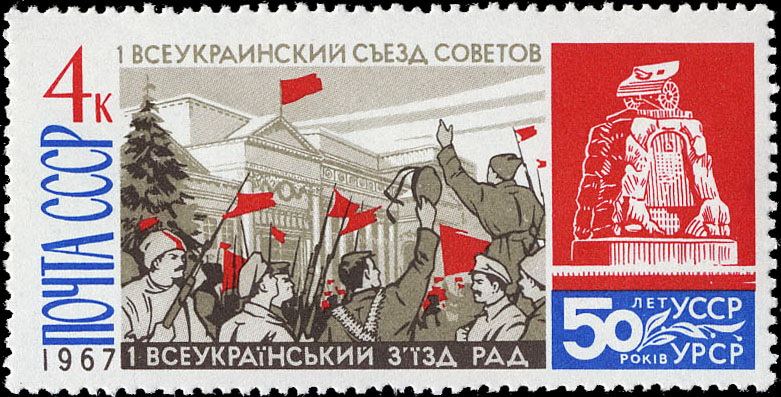
The stamp of the USSR commemorating 50th anniversary of the first All-Ukrainian congress of Soviets, 1967

First All-Ukrainian Congress of Soviets (Ukrainian: Перший Всеукраїнський з'їзд Рад, romanized: Pershyi Vseukrainskyi zizd Rad) was a congress of Soviets (councils) of workers, peasants, and Red Guards deputies that took place in Kharkiv on December 24-25, 1917.

== Overview ==
On December 21, 1917 the Red Guards of the Soviet Russia led by Vladimir Antonov-Ovseyenko occupied Kharkiv. At night on December 22, 1917 the Russian Red Guards with local Bolsheviks disarmed Ukrainian military units and arrested leaders of the Kharkiv City Council and garrison. On December 23, 1917 Bolsheviks established a revkom (revolutionary committee). The headquarters of a local Red Guard was established on December 14, 1917 and was located in the Stock Exchange building at Market Square (today Ploshcha Konstytutsii - Constitution Square).

The Congress of Soviets took place on December 24-25 1917, in the building of Noble Assembly (Market Square) in Kharkiv. The congress initially gathered 964 participants, which later rose to 1250. The congress reviewed several issues: attitudes towards the Central Rada of the Ukrainian People's Republic, war and peace, organization of military forces, about Ukraine and Soviet Russia, estate and financial issues and others.

The congress approved the Treaty of Brest-Litovsk between the Russian SFSR and Central Powers, declared the independence of the Soviet Ukrainian People's Republic as a federative republic of Soviet Russia, ratified the decree on socialization of land adopted by the 3rd All-Russian Congress of Soviets, and decrees on the 8-hour work day and labor control, organization of the Workers-Peasant Red Army of Ukraine. The policy of the Central Council of Ukraine in the resolution "On political moment" was condemned, requesting withdrawal of the Austrian and German Armed Forces from Ukraine. Participants elected the new composition of the Central Executive Committee of Ukraine of 102 members headed by Vladimir Zatonsky.

== Composition ==
There were about 200 delegates with deciding votes and six with consultative. A large majority were held by the Bolsheviks.

== Agenda ==
- "On the current moment" (Fyodor Sergeyev)
- "Self-determination of Ukraine"
- "Self-determination of Donets and Kryvyi Rih basins"
- "Organization of power in Ukraine"
- "Elections to the Central Executive Committee of Ukraine"

== Decisions ==
- (on current moment) The congress adopted a resolution in which declared about complete support for the October Revolution and welcomed the policy of Sovnarkom
- (self-determination of Ukraine) The congress noted that only the October Revolution and the Soviet government created by it ensured the implementation of the principle of the right of nations on self-determination that the victory of Socialist Revolution and decrees of Sovnarkom will liquidate any forms of national exploitation and inequality in Russia. The congress recognized the Ukrainian Republic as a federative part of the Russian Republic, announced decisive battle against the Central Council's policy disastrous for workers-peasants masses, and uncovered its bourgeois counter-revolutionary nature. The congress declared that will fight for the Ukrainian Workers-Peasant Republic established on a tight solidarity of workers masses of Ukraine with workers masses of all Russia independently of their national belonging. The congress called on all workers and peasants, all Ukrainian people in every way to protect and strengthen brotherly union with workers and peasants of Russia.
- (organization of power) The congress solved the fundamental question of socialist revolution in Ukraine. In its resolution adopted on December 25, 1917 the congress declared establishment of the Soviet power in Ukraine.
- (Donets and Kryvyi Rih basins) The congress protested against the criminal imperial policy of Kaledin's and the Ukrainian National Bourgeois counter revolution which tried to divide between each other Donets basin and declared that will seek unity of Donets basin within borders of the Soviet republic.

The congress elected 41 members to the Central Executive Committee (CVK), 35 of which were Bolsheviks. Twenty more seats were reserved for peasants deputies that were supposed to elected at an All-Ukrainian Congress of Soviet of peasant deputies. The head of the CVK was elected Yukhym Medvedev. The congress also established the People's Secretariat.

== Elected All-Ukrainian Central Executive Committee members ==
No.	Member	Political Party	Notes
1	Pyotr Anokhin	Bolshevik	
2	Mykola Artamonov	Bolshevik	
3	Voldemar Aussem	Bolshevik	People's Secretariat
4	Sergei Bakinsky	Bolshevik	People's Secretariat
5	Yevgenia Bosch	(Bolshevik)	People's Secretariat
6	Borys Bielenkyi	(Bolshevik)	
7	Oleksander Horvits	(Bolshevik)	
8	Boris Gokhman	(M.Int.)	
9	Mykola Danylevskyi	(Bolshevik)	
10	Petro Zahrebelnyi	(Bolshevik)	
11	Andrei Ivanov	(Bolshevik)	
12	Izrail Kulyk	(Bolshevik)	People's Secretariat
13	Yuriy Lapchynskyi	(Bolshevik)	People's Secretariat
14	Vladimir Lyuksemburg	(Bolshevik)	People's Secretariat
15	Yakiv Martianiv	(Bolshevik)	
16	Yukhym Medvedev	(left Ukrainian SD)	
17	Andriy Novikov	(SR)	
18	Arshak Aleksandrov	(left SR)	
19	Mikhail Ostrogorsky	(Bolshevik)	
20	Leonid Pyatakov	(Bolshevik)	
21	Oleksiy Piontkovskyi	(Bolshevik)	

No.	Member	Political Party	Notes
22	Mykola Poldiaev	(Bolshevik)	
23	Polikarp Reshetko	(Bolshevik)	
24	Ivan Sambur	(Bolshevik)	
25	Ovsiy Sehal	(Bolshevik)	
26	Serhiy Syvkov	(Bolshevik)	
27	Silin	(Bolshevik)	
28	Slutskyi	(Bolshevik)	
29	Smoliakiv	(Bolshevik)	
30	Fyodor Sergeyev	(Bolshevik)	People's Secretariat
31	Aleksander Emelianov (Surik)	(Bolshevik)	
32	Mykola Tarnohrodskyi	(Bolshevik)	
33	Yevhen Terletskyi	(left SR)	People's Secretariat
34	Yukhym Tyniakov	(Bolshevik)	
35	Samuil Firger	(Bolshevik)	
36	Alfred Tseiger	(Bolshevik)	
37	Mykola Chupylka	(Bolshevik)	
38	Vasyl' Shakhrai	(Bolshevik)	People's Secretariat
39	Stepan Sheludko	(SR)	
40	Shustrov	(Bolshevik)	
41	Isaak Erlikherman	(left SR)	

To the People's Secretariat were elected Nikolay Skripnik, Vladimir Zatonsky and Emmanuil Luganovsky (Portugeis) who were not elected to the All-Ukrainian Central Executive Committee. Later to the People's Secretariat were added Yevgeniy Neronovich, Yuriy Kotsiubynsky, Vladimir Antonov-Ovseyenko, Ivan Klimenko.
