= Ukrainian People's Republic of Soviets =

1917–1918 republic of the Russian SFSR

Ukrainian People's Republic of Soviets Українська Народна Республіка Рад
- Republic of the Russian SFSR
- 1917–1918
- Flag
- Capital: Kharkiv
- Area
  - Coordinates: 49°59′N 36°13′E
- Government
  - Type: Soviet republic
- Legislature: Soviets
- Historical era: World War I
  - Established: 25 December 1917
  - Merged with Odesa Soviet Republic into Ukrainian Soviet Republic: March 1918
| Preceded by | Succeeded by |
| Ukrainian People's Republic | Ukrainian Soviet Republic |
- Today part of: Ukraine; Russia

The Ukrainian People's Republic of Soviets (Ukrainian: Українська Народна Республіка Рад, romanized: Ukrainska Narodna Respublika Rad; Russian: Украинская Народная Республика Советов, romanized: Ukrainskaya Narodnaya Respublika Sovetov) was a short-lived (1917–1918) Soviet republic of the Russian SFSR that was created by the declaration of the Kharkiv All-Ukrainian Congress of Soviets "On the self-determination of Ukraine" on 25 December [O.S. 12 December] 1917 in the Zemstvo building in Kharkiv. Headed by the Provisional Workers' and Peasants' Government of Ukraine formed earlier in Russian Kursk. The republic was later united into the Ukrainian Soviet Republic and, eventually, liquidated, because of a cessation of support from the government of the Russian SFSR when the Treaty of Brest-Litovsk was signed.

== History ==
=== Preparation of the All-Ukrainian congress of Soviets in Kyiv ===
The idea to call for an All-Ukrainian Congress of Soviets was put forward by the Bolshevik faction within the executive committee of the Kyiv Council of workers' deputies during the united session of the executive committees of the councils (soviets) of workers' and soldiers' deputies of Kyiv city on 16 November [O.S. 3 November] 1917, soon after the Kyiv Bolshevik Uprising had failed to establish Soviet power in the city. The united session of the councils adopted the Bolshevik resolution concerning the Congress on 17 November [O.S. 4 November] 1917 (the next day). On 24 November [O.S. 11 November] 1917 the same resolution was adopted by the Kharkiv council of workers' and soldiers' deputies, also as a result of the Bolshevik proposal. The proposition that was put forward by the Kyiv Bolsheviks supported the Central Committee of the Russian Social Democratic Labour Party (bolsheviks) and the government of Soviet Russia.

On 30 November [O.S. 17 November] 1917, talks took place between Sergei Bakinsky (born Ludwig Bernheim) representing the Kyiv Bolsheviks, Mykola Porsh representing the Central Council of Ukraine, and Joseph Stalin, the newly appointed (26 November [O.S. 13 November] 1917) Russian People's Commissar on National Affairs. Stalin, at the behest of the government of the Russian Soviet Federative Socialist Republic, immediately recommended that action should be taken to assemble such a congress. He also insisted that power should not remain with the Central Council of Ukraine but should instead be transferred to the regional congress of Councils (Soviets) and to local councils (soviets). As a result of the proposition put forward by the Bolsheviks, the preparation for the assembly of the All-Ukrainian Congress of Soviets was undertaken by the regional executive committee of councils of workers', peasants, and soldiers' deputies of the Southwestern Krai that was created in the spring of 1917 in Kyiv.

On 7 December [O.S. 24 November] 1917 the regional executive committee adopted a declaration on the assembly of an All-Ukrainian Congress of Soviets on 16 December [O.S. 3 December] 1917 in Kyiv. An organizational bureau was created and this developed a system of representation on the assumption that around 500 people would attend the Congress. Representatives of all the councils of workers', peasants', and soldiers' deputies from guberniyas, counties, and cities should have participated in the Congress, including ones that were under influence of Ukrainian parties. However, the representational system gave a great advantage to delegates from the councils of the industrial regions and the big cities where Bolsheviks had the biggest influence. In contrast, the peasants' representation was so limited that it was going to be even smaller than in the Fourth State Duma under Tsarist rule.

=== Ukrainian Constituent Assembly ===
The Central Council of Ukraine had already passed a bill concerning elections to the Ukrainian Constituent Assembly, but over two weeks later, on 30 October [O.S. 17 October] 1917, the Russian Provisional Government accused the General Secretariat of Ukraine of separatism and threatened to take the matter to court. The government of Ukraine proposed sending a delegation to settle the disagreement but the Petrograd events of 7–8 November 1917 changed their plans. On 20 November 1917 the Central Council of Ukraine issued its Third (Universal) Decree in which it announced the date for the convening of the Ukrainian Constituent Assembly as 9 January 1918. On 29 November 1917, the Central Council finally adopted the Law "about elections to the Constituent Assembly of Ukrainian People's Republic".

=== December events, the congress and Soviet ultimatum ===
In order to activate the Bolshevik organizations and increase their control over the councils in Ukraine, the Bolshevik leadership considered it necessary to create an All-Ukrainian Bolshevik center. For this purpose Grigoriy Zinoviev, a member of the Communist Central Committee arrived in Kyiv along with Semyon Roshal, a Russian government commissar from the Romanian Front. On 11 December [O.S. 29 November] 1917 the Kyiv Military-Revolutionary Committee handed an ultimatum to the Central Council of Ukraine threatening to destroy Kyiv or transfer authority over Ukraine to the Bolsheviks. Simultaneously Yevgenia Bosch managed to direct the 2nd Guard Corps of the 7th Army from the Romanian Front to Kyiv in support of another Bolshevik uprising. This uprising was preemptively put down with almost no bloodshed due to the efforts of Yuriy Kapkan, the Kyiv commandant, and Pavlo Skoropadsky, the General of the 1st Ukrainian Corps.

On 16–18 December [O.S. 3–5 December] 1917 a regional congress of Bolsheviks in Ukraine took place in Kyiv. The congress decided to create a single party for Ukraine and call it "RSDLP(b) – Social-democracy of Ukraine" (Russian: РСДРП(б) – Социал-демократия Украины). The party elected a Chief Committee that consisted of Aussem, Shakhrai, Lapchinsky, Bosch, Zatonsky, Aleksandrov, Kulik, Grinevich, Gorvits and candidates Lyuksemburg, Gamarnik, Galperin, Pyatakov. On 17 December [O.S. 4 December] 1917 the All-Ukrainian Congress of Soviets was begun in the Merchant's Assembly building in Kyiv. After the Bolsheviks realized that they would not gain a majority in the Congress, they demanded that the gathering was not recognized as a congress, but rather as a meeting. When their proposal was rejected, the 127 Bolsheviks left the Congress. On the same day (17 December [O.S. 4 December] 1917) the government of Soviet Russia sent an ultimatum to the Central Council signed by Vladimir Lenin and Leon Trotsky giving the Ukrainian side 48 hours to respond. The next day the government of Russia, without waiting for an answer, declared that it considered the Central Council of Ukraine its enemy and appointed Vladimir Antonov-Ovseyenko as the commander of the Soviet Red Guards. On 18 December [O.S. 5 December] 1917 the 124 delegates that left the All-Ukrainian Congress of Soviets gathered in a special meeting in the Kyiv Central Bureau of Trade Unions and adopted a resolution about the relentless struggle with the Central Council, about the immediate election of the All-Ukrainian Central Executive Committee of Soviets and about moving to Kharkiv to carry out the Congress there. On 20 December [O.S. 7 December] 1917 the Central Council of Ukraine sent an answer to the Soviet ultimatum signed by Volodymyr Vynnychenko and Symon Petlyura, rejecting it. The next day the Red Guards led by Antonov-Ovsiyenko entered Kharkiv and completely took over the city on 22 December [O.S. 9 December] 1917. Ovsiyenko's Army was supported by Cheka military formations led by Mikhail Rozen. On the same day (22 December [O.S. 9 December] 1917) the first stage of the treaty of Brest-Litovsk negotiations began, although its signing would take over two months.

The decline of Russian moderate socialists after the October Revolution drove more supporters towards the Ukrainian nationalist parties. The Bolshevik Ukrainians reassembled in Kharkiv (where there was little support for Ukrainian nationalism) and on 24 December [O.S. 11 December] 1917 declared themselves as the government of all Ukraine. Local Bolsheviks in Odessa and Ekaterinoslav revolted and took over their cities.

=== Establishment of the Soviet government ===
After Kharkiv had been taken by the Red Guards for two days, the other All-Ukrainian Congress of Soviets finally took place. The session opened in the Noble Assembly building. On 25 December [O.S. 12 December] 1917, the Congress declared the creation of the Ukrainian People's Republic of Soviets and established as its governing body the Central Executive Committee of Ukraine (CVK of Soviet Ukraine). On 26 December [O.S. 13 December] 1917 the first session of the CVK of Soviet Ukraine took place, electing its presidium and commissions. Yukhym Medvedev of the Ukrainian Social Democratic Labour Party was elected as the chairman of the CVK. On the same day, the Soviet government established the People's Secretariat of Ukraine, an organisation similar to its main rival, the General Secretariat of Ukraine. Additionally, a telegram was telegraphed to the Russian Sovnarkom concerning the establishment of Soviet power in Ukraine.

== Government ==
=== Executive ===
Government functions were handed to the People's Secretariat of Ukraine (a combination of a People's Commissariat and a General Secretariat). The government consisted of 13 secretariats that corresponded to ministries and were headed by People's Secretaries. The government's first composition was adopted by the CVK on 27 December [O.S. 14 December] 1917 (30 December [O.S. 17 December] 1917 according to "Handbook of History of Ukraine").

| Secretariat | Secretary | Affiliation | Ethnicity |
|---|---|---|---|
| Trade and Industry | Fyodor Sergeyev (Artyom) | Bolshevik | Russian |
| Finances | Vladimir Aussem | Bolshevik | German |
| Internal Affairs | Yevgenia Bosch | Bolshevik | German |
| Labor | Nikolai Skripnik | Bolshevik | Ukrainian |
| Education | Vladimir Zatonsky | Bolshevik | Ukrainian |
| International Affairs | Sergei Bakinsky | Bolshevik | |
| Food Supply | Emmanuil Luganovsky | Bolshevik | Jewish |
| Court Affairs | Vladimir Lyuksemburg | Bolshevik | |
| Military Affairs | Vasiliy Shakhrai | Bolshevik | Ukrainian |
| Secretariat Affairs | Georgiy Lapchinsky | Bolshevik | Ukrainian |
| Land Cultivation | Yevgeniy Terletsky | Left SR | Ukrainian |
| Post and Telegraph | vacant | | |
| Roads | vacant | | |

12 January [O.S. 30 December] 1918 Vasiliy Shakhrai, who left to participate in the Brest-Litovsk peace talks, was replaced by the Ukrainian Bolshevik Yuriy Kotsyubynsky. On 1 February [O.S. 19 January] 1918 he was appointed Commander in Chief of the armed forces of the republic.
