= Ukrainian Republic =

Ukrainian Republic refers to Ukraine. Articles about historical Ukraine:

- Ukrainian People's Republic of Soviets, 1917–1918
- Ukrainian Soviet Republic, 1918
- Ukrainian People's Republic, 1917–1921
- West Ukrainian People's Republic, 1918–1919
- Ukrainian Soviet Socialist Republic, 1919–1991 (also called Ukrainian Socialist Soviet Republic)
- Ukraine, proclaimed in 1991
