= Yevheniia Bosh Bridge =

Coordinates: 50°26′32″N 30°33′52.3″E

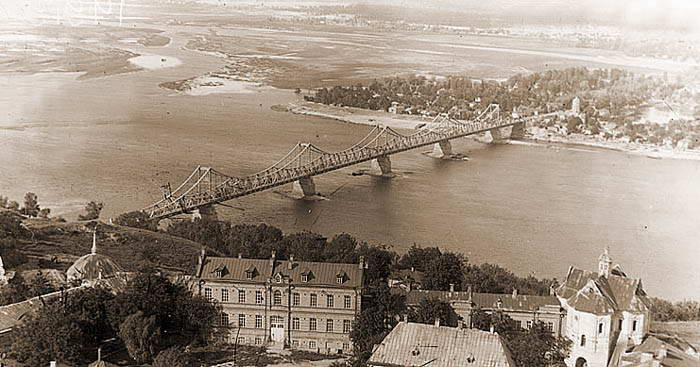
Мі́ст і́мені Євге́нії Бош (Yevheniia Bosh Bridge), 1930s

The Мі́ст і́мені Євге́нії Бош (Yevheniia Bosh Bridge) was a bridge across the Dnieper River in Kyiv that existed from 1925 to 1941. It was destroyed by Soviet military sappers in September 1941 during the Red Army's retreat from Ukraine.

== History and description ==
On June 9, 1920, retreating Polish troops blew up the pier of the Nicholas Chain Bridge (Mykolaiv Chain Bridge) closest to the right bank. The snapped chains dragged the entire structure down with them.

In 1921, a restoration team from the People's Commissariat of Transport blew up the remaining chain sections, which were obstructing navigation; they sank to the riverbed. The Chain Bridge was never rebuilt after this. Between 1921 and 1923, various proposals for recreating the bridge were considered, ranging from restoring it to its original form—by raising and repairing the chains and rebuilding the destroyed pier—to a project involving a major reconstruction of the pylons.

All proposals to restore the bridge using the original chain-suspension design were rejected because it was technically impossible to raise the bridge's wreckage from the riverbed.

A decision to revisit the bridge's reconstruction was made in late 1921; however, Evgeny Paton did not submit a plan for a major reconstruction (essentially a new structure) until January 1924. By that time, bridge engineering science had demonstrated that chain-suspension designs were ill-suited for multi-span bridges: they were prone to significant oscillation under load and were liable to total collapse if damaged at any single point. Therefore, it was decided to utilize the surviving piers but to construct the bridge using a beam design. The new bridge—featuring a navigable span 4.2 meters higher than the previous one—was built using I-beams that had remained on the banks of the Dnieper following the 1919 dismantling of strategic highway bridges in the Kyiv area. The new structure offered greater load-bearing capacity and width, as well as a superior weight-to-capacity ratio (the ratio of the weight of the metal used to the bridge's useful load-bearing capacity).

Construction took ten months. The new bridge opened on May 10, 1925, and was named in honor of Yevgenia Bosch —a Bolshevik who had fought against the Ukrainian People's Republic (UNR) during the Soviet-Ukrainian War and had taken her own life just months before the bridge's inauguration. Coinciding with the bridge's opening, the gasoline-powered tram service to Darnytsia was restored. On June 1, 1926, the tram line to the Left Bank was electrified.

The Yevhenia Bosh Bridge was the last of Kyiv's bridges to be mined and blown up by Soviet forces; it was destroyed on September 18, 1941, at 2:40 pm by a special combat engineer unit of the Soviet 37th Army—commanded by Colonel Oleksandr Holdovych—during the Red Army's retreat from the city. Footage of the destroyed bridge can be seen in issue No. 578 of the German newsreel Die Deutsche Wochenschau (covering the capture of Kyiv), in a color photograph by Johannes Hähle dating to early September 1941, and in a Slovak newsreel documenting Jozef Tiso's visit to Kyiv.

Slightly south of the destroyed bridge, near the Lavra, the Germans built a temporary wooden bridge named after Gerhard von Scharnhorst (which was destroyed during the retreat in 1943).

The bridge was not rebuilt after World War II.

== After its destruction ==
The bridge's piers remained standing until the mid-1960s—serving for a time as supports for a power transmission line —before being demolished by explosives during the construction of the Metro Bridge, which was built slightly further north.

In the spring of 2010, a temporary drop in water levels revealed the remains of three of the old bridge's piers.

== Images ==
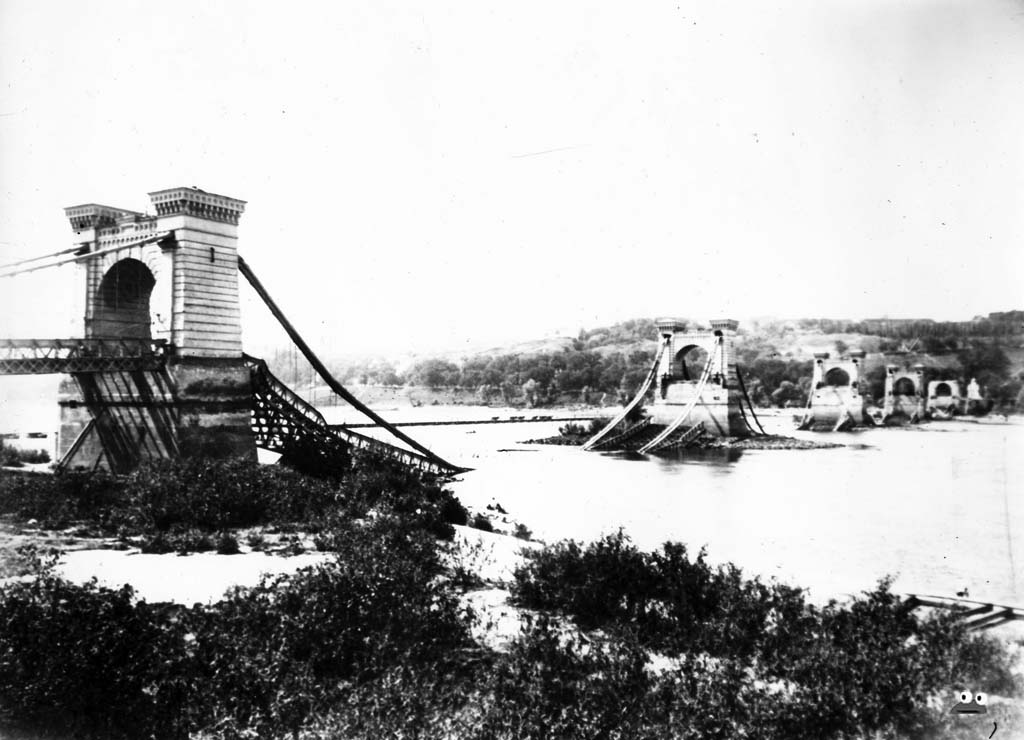
Destroyed Chain Bridge in Kyiv, first half of the 1920s

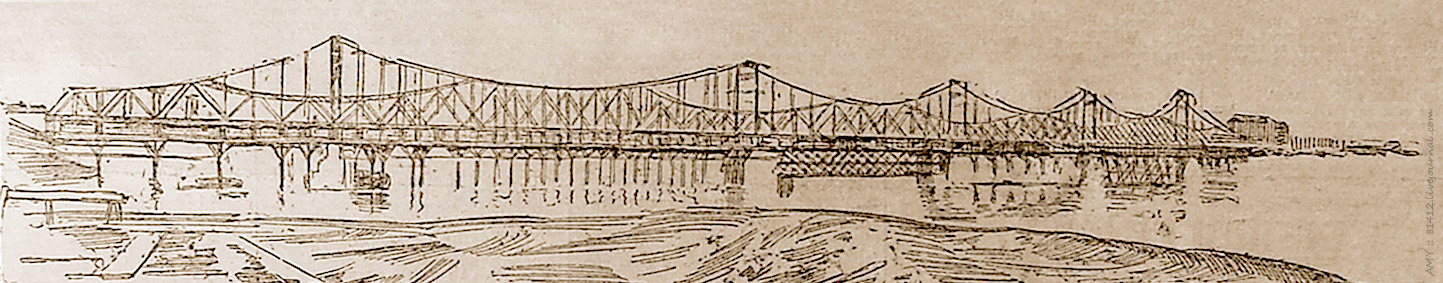
Yevheniia Bosh Bridge in Kyiv, *Bilshovyk* newspaper, May 10, 1925

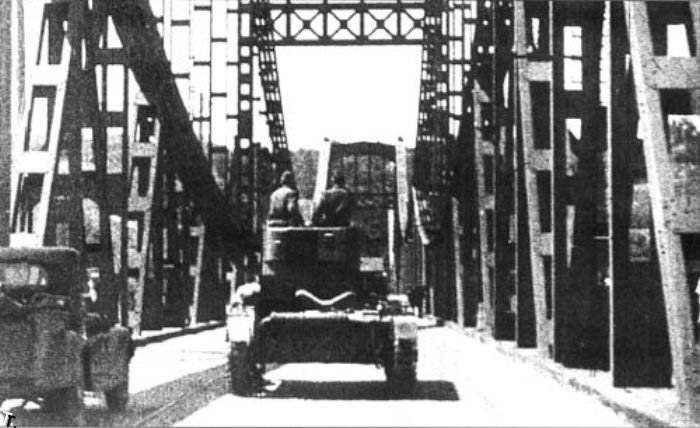
Soviet T-26 tank on the Yevheniia Bosh Bridge, summer 1941

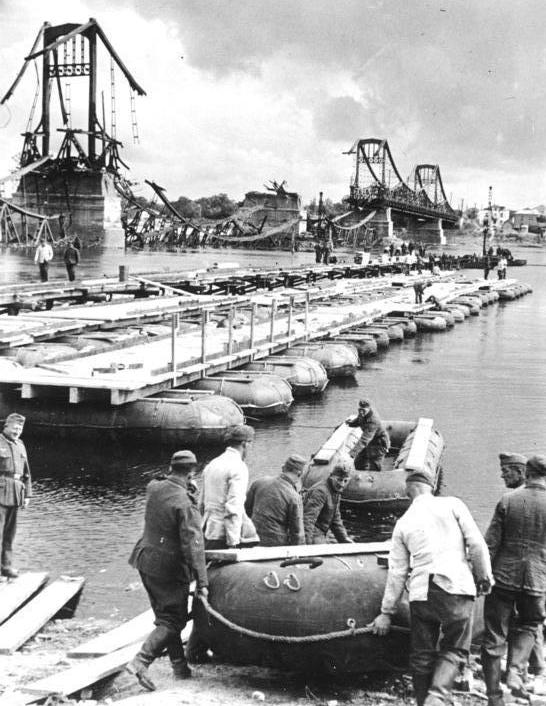
German soldiers constructing a pontoon crossing near the destroyed Yevheniia Bosh Bridge, September 1941

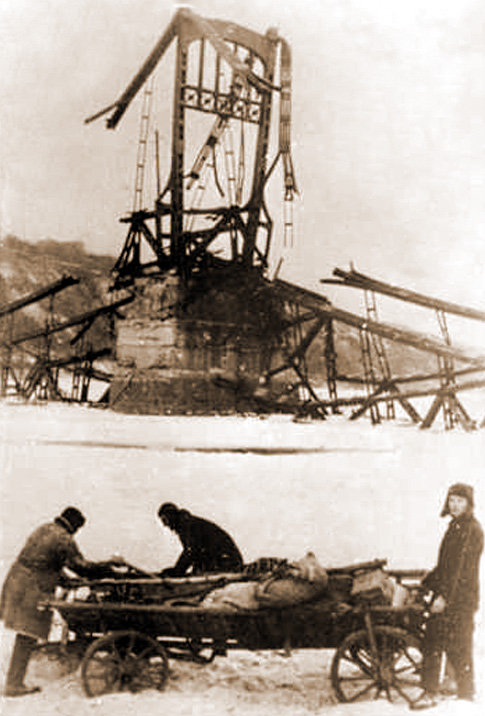
Destroyed Yevheniia Bosh Bridge, winter 1942

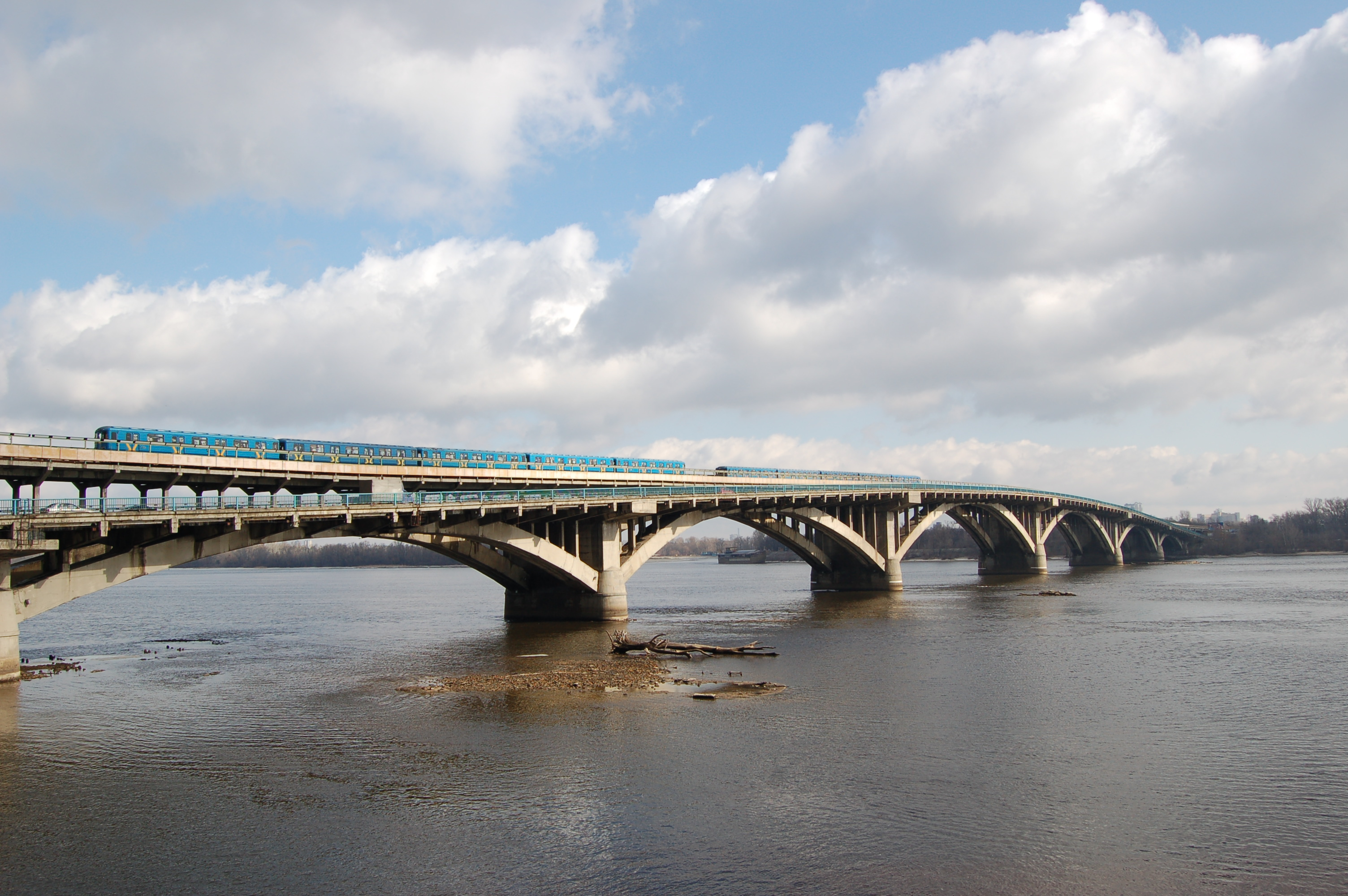
Remains of the Yevheniia Bosh Bridge piers near the Metro Bridge in Kyiv, March 2010

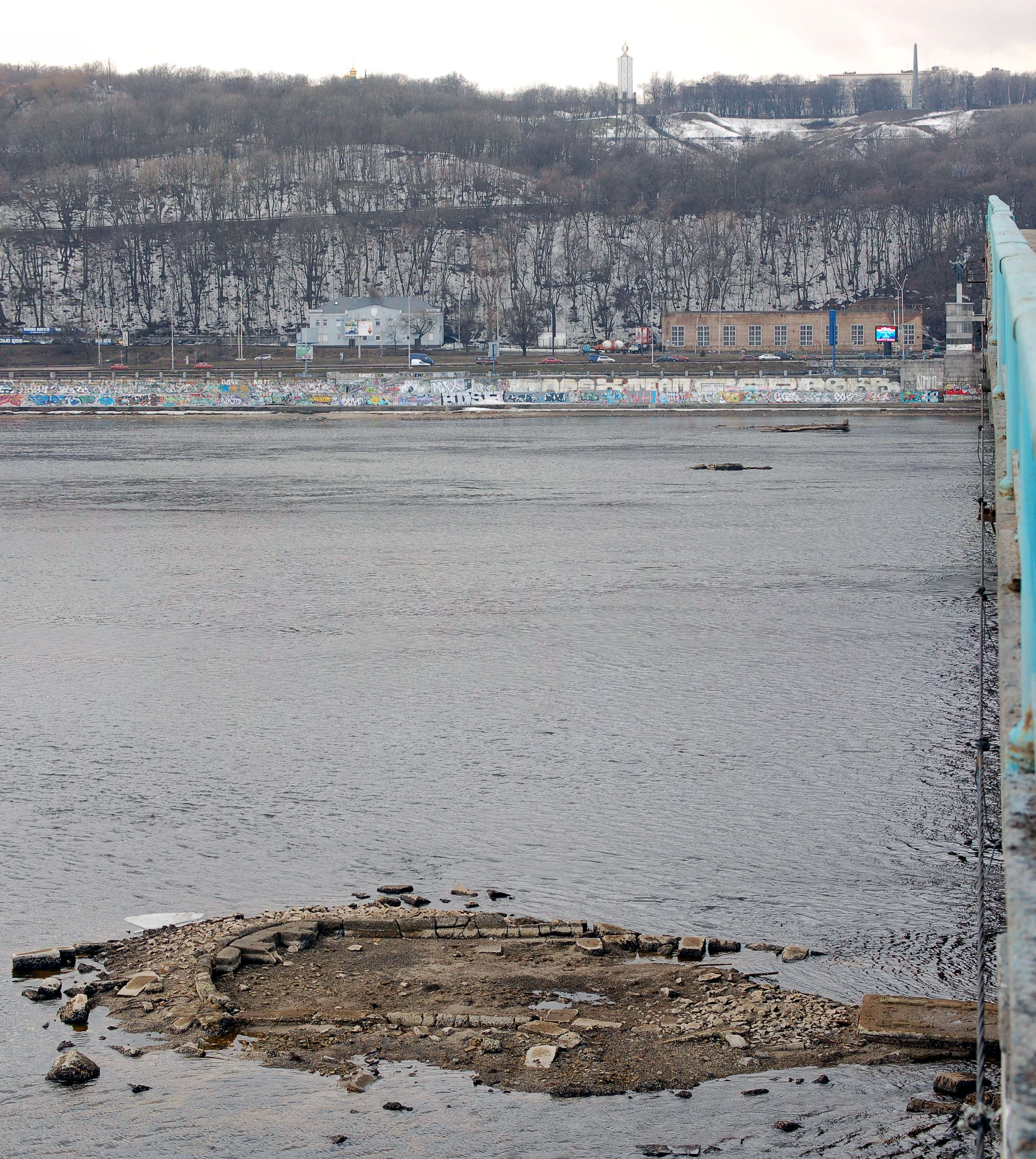
Remains of the Yevheniya Bosh Bridge near the Metro Bridge in Kyiv, March 2010

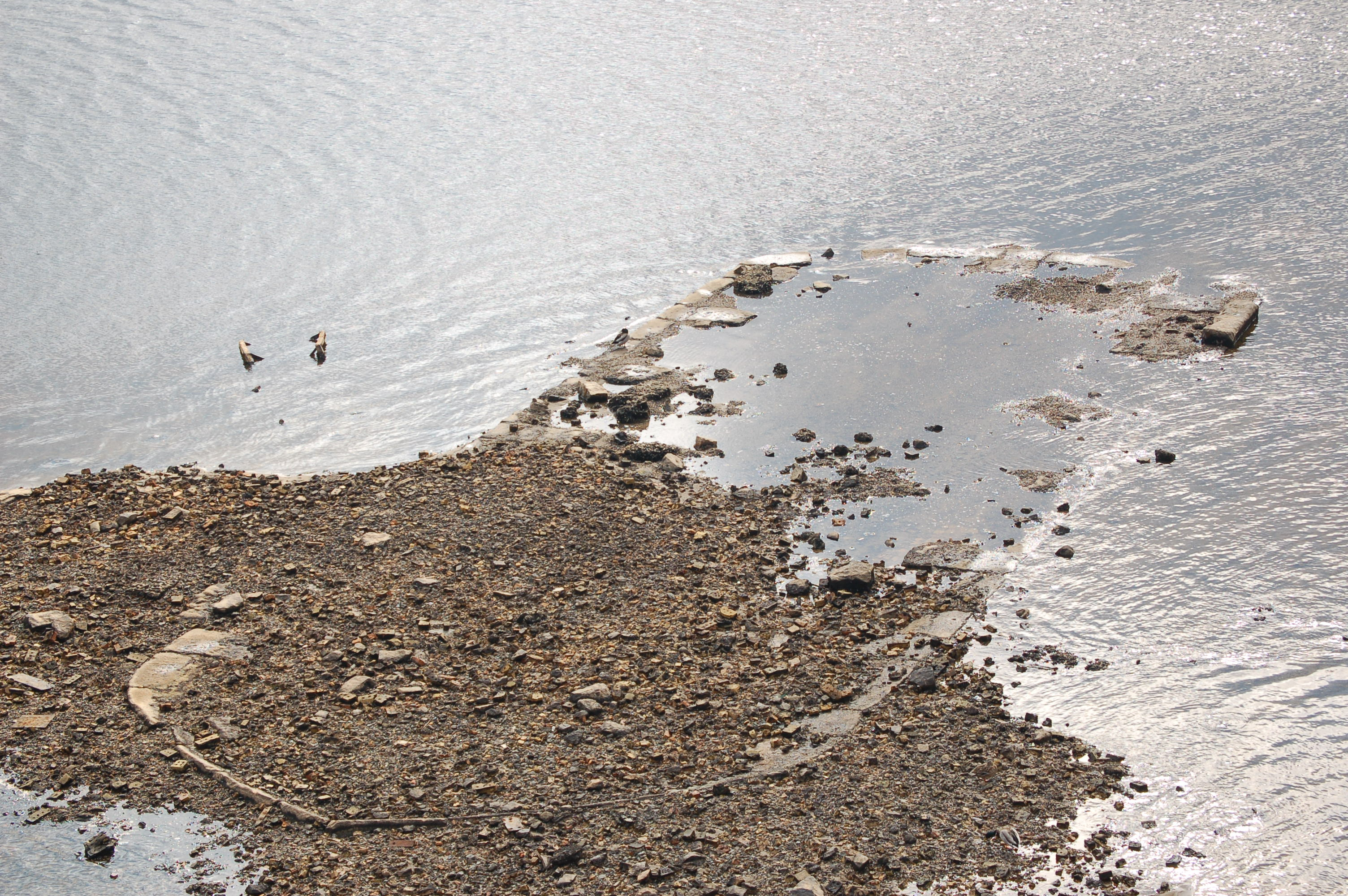
Remains of the first pier of the Yevheniya Bosh Bridge near the Metro Bridge in Kyiv, March 2010

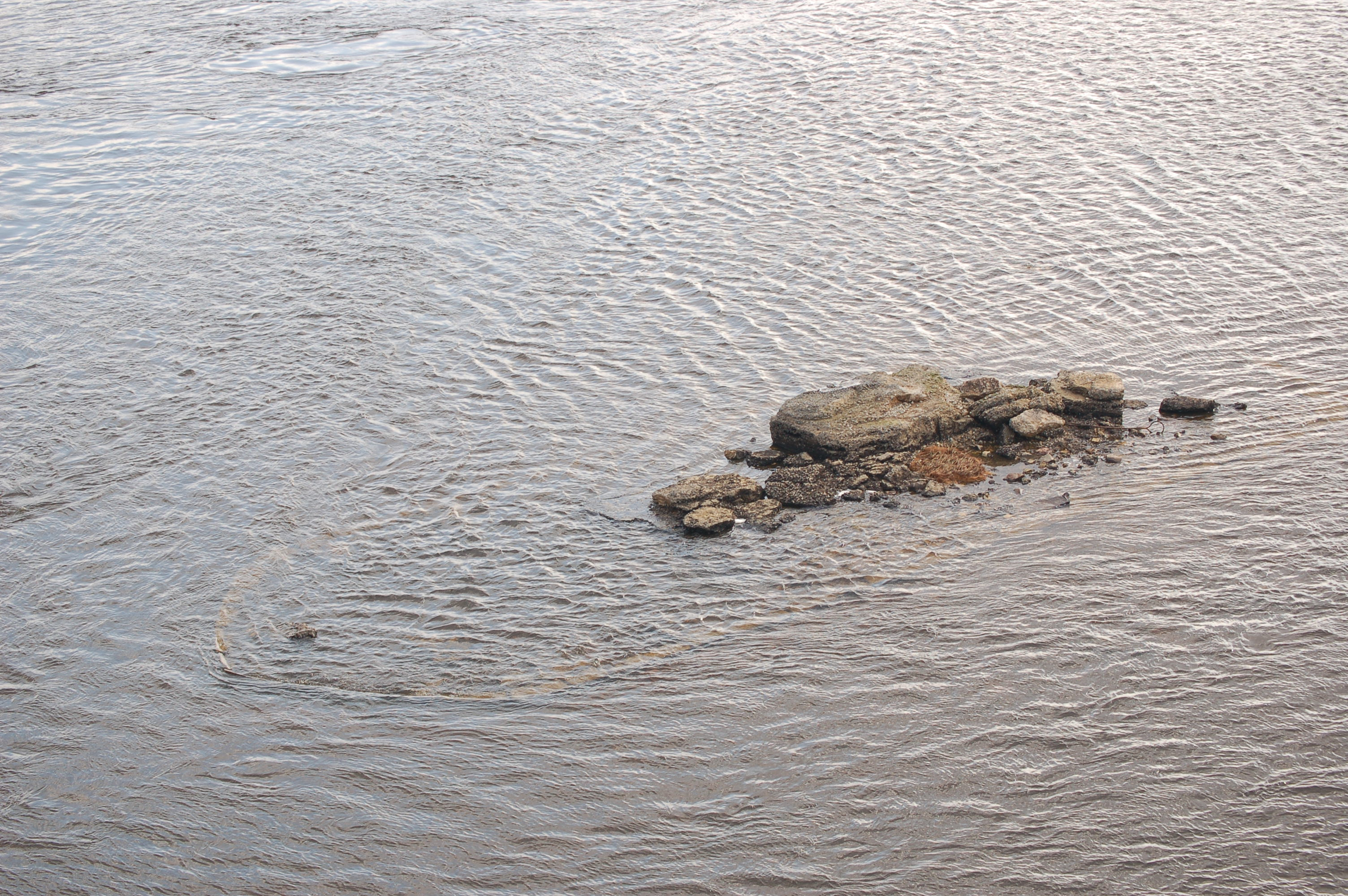
Remains of the second pier of the Yevheniya Bosh Bridge near the Metro Bridge in Kyiv, March 2010

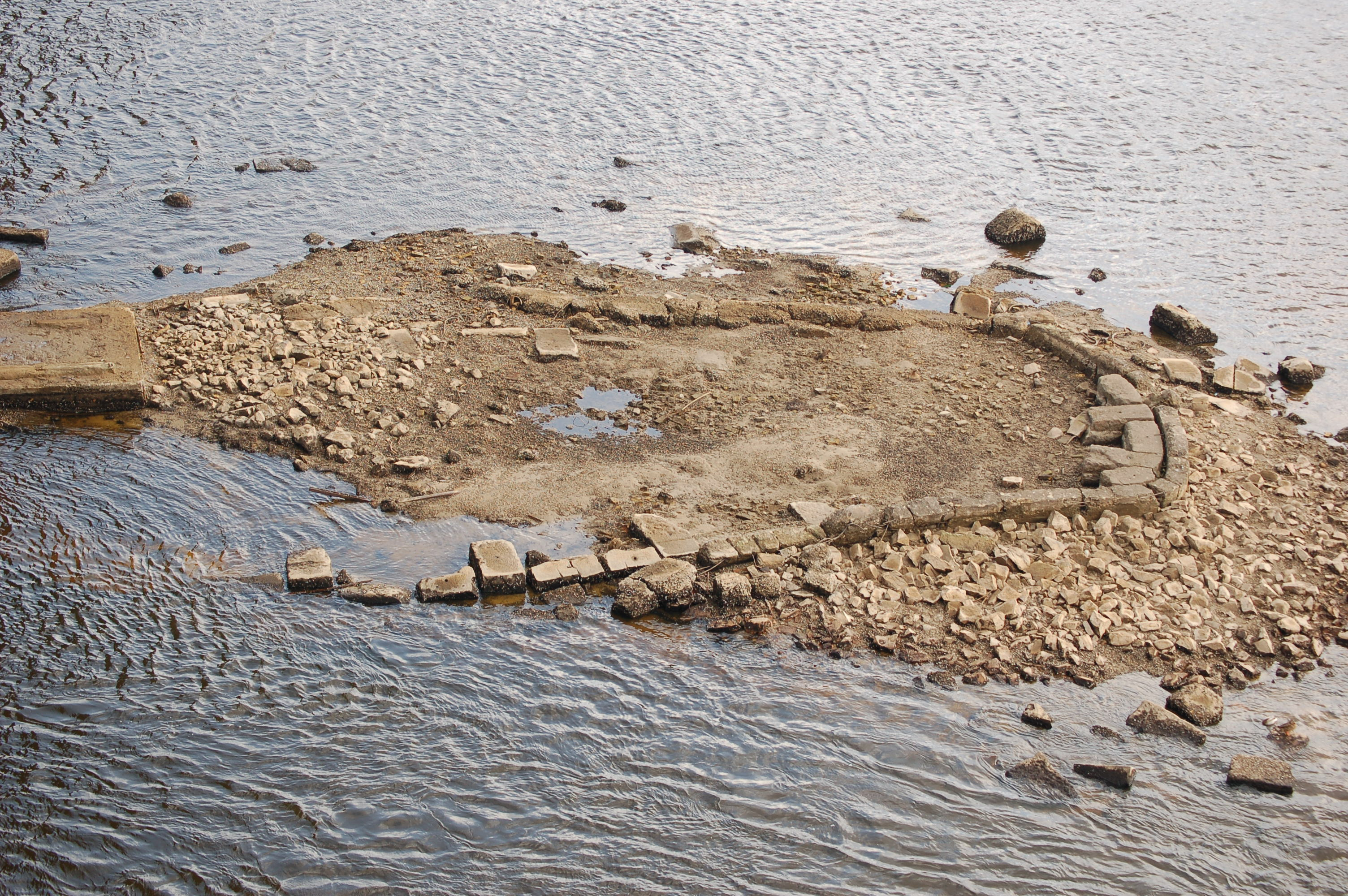
Remains of the fifth pier of the Yevheniya Bosh Bridge near the Metro Bridge in Kyiv, March 2010
