= Kotsiubynsky =

Kotsiubynsky (Ukrainian: Коцюбинський) is a Ukrainian surname. Notable people with the surname include:

- Mykhailo Kotsiubynsky (1864–1913), Ukrainian author
- Yuriy Kotsiubynsky (1896–1937), Ukrainian revolutionary and politician
