= Yevhen Neronovych =

Yevhen Vasyliovych Neronovych Євген Васильович Неронович
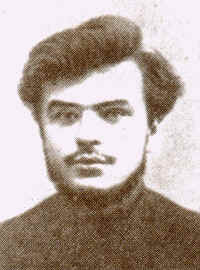

People's Secretary of Military Affairs (acting)
- In office March 1918 – March 1918
- Preceded by: Yuriy Kotsiubynsky (concurrently)
- Succeeded by: resigned

Personal details
- Born: 1888 Pyriatyn, Piryatinsky Uyezd, Poltava Governorate, Russian Empire
- Died: 25 March 1918 (aged 30) Velyki Sorochyntsi, Ukrainian People's Republic
- Citizenship: Russia
- Party: USDRP, RSDLP(b) (1918)

Yevhen Vasyliovych Neronovych (Ukrainian: Євген Васильович Неронович) (1888—25 March 1918) was a Ukrainian politician, Bolshevik activist, member of the Ukrainian People's Republic of Soviets government.

== Biography ==
Neronovych was born in Pyriatyn, in the Poltava Governorate of the Russian Empire. He studied in Saint Petersburg. In 1913 he was a chief editor of the Ukrainian student chronicles in Saint Petersburg. Neronovych at first was a member of the Ukrainian Social Democratic Labour Party (USDRP), later heading the left faction of the party whose program was the creation of an independent Soviet Ukraine. In 1917-1918 he was member of the Central Rada and Mala Rada. On 2 November 1917 he was a speaker at the All-Ukrainian Military Congress that took place in Kiev from 2 to 8 November 1917. The members of the congress were taken by a complete surprise when they found out about the October Revolution. The next day, after the session of the congress elapsed, the local Bolshevik faction raised a revolt in Kiev similar to that in Petrograd.

In 1918 Neronovych joined the Bolsheviks. He was given a government portfolio in the Ministry of Military Affairs in March 1918 along with Yuriy Kotsiubynsky and Vladimir Antonov-Ovseyenko as a part of the Ministry triumvirate, an analog of the Russian in the Lenin's sovnarkom. By end of March he resigned for undeclared reasons.

On 25 March 1918 he was executed by Ukrainian military forces as a member of the Soviet government in the town of Velyki Sorochyntsi, near Poltava.

== Legacy ==
Several streets were renamed after Neronovych after the end of the Civil war in cities such as Kiev, Kamyanets-Podilsky and Hadiach. The town of Velyki Sorochyntsi, the birthplace of Nikolai Gogol, was called Neronovychi in 1925–1931.

Political offices
Preceded by Yuriy Kotsiubynsky	Deputy of People's Secretary of Military Affairs; March 1918	Succeeded by resigned
