= Sergei Bakinsky =

Soviet politician (1886–1939)

Sergei Bakinsky Сергей Сергеевич Бакинский
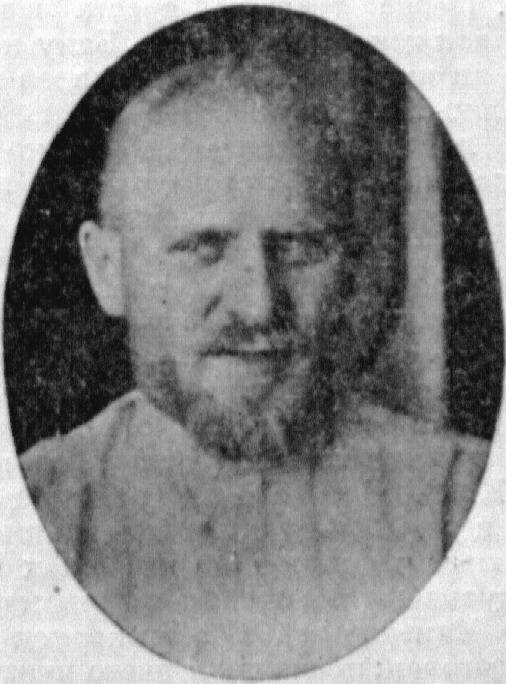

People's Secretary on Nationalities (People's Secretariat)
- In office December 24, 1917 – March 4, 1918
- Prime Minister: Yevgenia Bosch
- Preceded by: position created
- Succeeded by: Ivan Kulyk (as International Affairs)

acting People's Secreatary of Transportation
- In office December 24, 1917 – March 4, 1918
- Prime Minister: Yevgenia Bosch
- Preceded by: position created
- Succeeded by: position liquidated

Personal details
- Born: Ludwig Markovich Bernheim; 1886 Riga, Russian Empire
- Died: 1939 (aged 52–53) Moscow, Soviet Union
- Education: Kazan University

Sergei Segeyevich Bakinsky (Russian: Серге́й Серге́евич Бакинский) was a Bolshevik politician, revolutionary, the first People's Commissar of Ukrainian People's Republic of Soviets on nationalities.

== Biography ==
Bakinsky was born in Riga, Russian Empire in a family of middle class merchant as Ludwig Markovich Bernheim. In 1904 he graduated from the 3rd Kazan Gymnasium and enrolled into Kazan University. In 1907 due to a student protest, Bakinsky was excluded from the university by the Ministry of Interior. In July 1907 he was convicted for two years with a right to emigrate. Outside of Russia Bakinsky worked as an editor for newspaper "Proletariat" and in 1908 he illegally returned to Russia.

Since 1904 Bakinsky is a member of the RSDLP(b) and in 1907 a secretary of the Government of Kazan party committee. In 1910 he finally received permission to live in Kazan, but due to persecution from authorities Bakinsky was forced to emigrate once again. In 1912–14 Bakinsky studied at the Saint Petersburg State University, while working as an editor for Pravda. Bakinsky was arrested three times and after the last rout of "Trudovaya Pravda" on July 8, 1914, he exiled to Kazan. In Kazan in 1915 Bakinsky has finally graduated from a law school of the university.

In 1915 Bakinsky moved to Moscow and joined the Zemgor union. During the first stages of World War I Bakinsky was at the Western and Caucasians fronts. At the end of 1916 he moved to Harbin. There, after the February Revolution, Bakinsky participated in creation of a local newspaper "Golos Truda" and worked as a director for the Bolshevik newspaper "Manchuzhuria" (later "Rabochiy Flag"). In July 1917 he left Harbin and traveled across Russia as agitation agent for the RSDLP(b).

In September 1917 Bakinsky moved to Kiev where he joined the preparation to the October Revolution. On October 28, 1917, he was arrested by junkers and cossacks along with other members of a newly created local revkom. In December 1917 Bakinsky participated in the first All-Ukrainian Congress of Soviets in Kharkiv where he was elected to the Central Executive Committee of Ukraine and appointed as the People's Commissar on Nationalities in the People's Secretariat. Later he also acted as a People's Commissar on Transportation. In March 1918 Bakinsky was also appointed as a Chief of military formations at the Ukrainian Front.

After occupation of Ukraine by German Armed Forces (April 1918), Bakinsky directed formations of the Eastern Front and as a staff member of Jukums Vācietis until 1919. Later a member of Revolutionary Military Council at the Caspiy-Caucasian Front for Glavpostavprodarm. From May 1919 to June 1920 Bakinsky headed a transportation department of the People's Commissariat of Food. Later he was a member of organizational bureau in formation of the Congress of Eastern Nations in Baku, headed the transportation trade union of the Azerbaijan Railways.

From spring of 1921 to 1924 Bakinsky worked in rail transportation. In 1925 he was a trade representative in Latvia. From 1926 to summer of 1927 Bakinsky is a member of the Chief Concession Committee, later a director of abroad operations for the People's Commissariat of Trade of USSR. From summer of 1929 Bakinsky was a director and an inspector of the State Bank. In 1939 he was repressed.

== Bibliography ==
- Great Soviet Encyclopedia. Vol.4. (Bakinsky).
- Antonov-Ovseyenko, V. Notes about the Civil War. Vol.1.
- Bosch, Ye. Years of struggle.
- Levi, Ye. Comrade Vlas.
- Erde, D. Revolution in Ukraine: from Kerensky times to the German occupation. "Proletariat". Kharkiv, 1927.
- Znamensky, N. Military organization at the Kazan Committee of RSDLP(b).
- Latsis, M. Four months in Kazan and near Kazan. Fight for Kazan. Collection of materials about the Czech-chartered intervention in 1918. Vol.1. Publishing and Press Combine. Kazan, 1924.
- Krestinsky, N. From epoch of "Zvezda" and "Pravda". Vol.3.
- Levin, Sh. Historical-reviewing collection.
- September 25, 1919. Blast at Leontyevsky pereulok (Leontyev Lane). Moscow, 1925.
- Livshits, S. Student social-democratic organizations prior to revolution.
- Kulik, I. Chronicles of Revolution. Vol.1. 1922
- Lapchinsky, G. Chronicles of Revolution. Vol.1. 1928
