= Anton Antonov-Ovseenko =

Russian historian and writer

Anton Vladimirovich Antonov-Ovseenko
- Антон Владимирович Антонов-Овсеенко
- Born: 23 February 1920; Moscow, Soviet Russia
- Died: 9 July 2013 (aged 93); Moscow, Russia
- Education: Moscow State Pedagogical Institute
- Occupations: Writer and historian
- Relatives: Vladimir Antonov-Ovseenko (father)

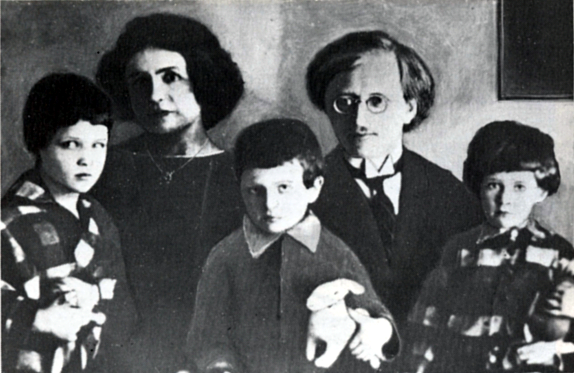
Anton Vladimirovich Antonov-Ovseenko (in centre) as a child with his siblings and parents during their stay in Prague, Czechoslovakia.

Anton Vladimirovich Antonov-Ovseenko (Russian: Анто́н Влади́мирович Анто́нов-Овсе́енко; 23 February 1920 – 9 July 2013) was a Russian historian and writer.

Born on 23 February 1920, he was the son of the Bolshevik military leader Vladimir Antonov-Ovseenko who commanded the assault on the Winter Palace. His mother, Rozaliya Borisovna Katsnelson, was arrested in 1929 as an “enemy of the people” and died by suicide in 1936 while imprisoned in Khanty-Mansiysk. Anton spent his childhood in Pioneer homes. His father was arrested in 1937 and executed in February 1938.

In 1935, Anton joined the historical faculty of the Moscow State Pedagogical Institute. In 1938, he was expelled from Komsomol and the institute wherein, however, he was reinstated in the same year. According to his sister Galina, Anton later renounced his father. From 1938 onward, he worked as a guide at art museums and exhibitions. In 1939, he graduated from an institute.

He was first arrested in 1940 on charges of complicity in an economic crime and sentenced to one and a half years of imprisonment. On 22 June 1941, he was again convicted on the same charges and sentenced to an additional two years. His third arrest occurred in 1943, when he was accused of counter-revolutionary agitation and sentenced by the Special Council of the NKVD to eight years in labor camps.

In the camp you are surrounded by philistines. They are flesh of the flesh of those dozens of philistines you knew who remained “on the outside”. In the rare moments when they are well fed, everything vile instilled in them by family, school, newspapers, “society”, and the Stalinist state comes to the surface. Kvas patriotism and chauvinism coexist peacefully in their minds with a readiness to sell out and betray one’s neighbour.

— Anton Antonov-Ovseenko

From 1953 to 1960, he worked as a cultural organizer at sanatoriums and holiday homes in Yevpatoria, Alupka, and Gagra. He published several books, including In the Name of the Revolution (1965) and V. A. Antonov-Ovseenko (1975), under the pseudonym Anton Rakitin. In 1983, his historical study on Stalin, Portrait of a Tyrant, was published in the United States. In connection with this, in November 1984 he was arrested again, despite being almost blind, charged with anti-Soviet agitation and propaganda, and expelled from Moscow. He returned to Moscow in 1986.

Antonov-Ovseenko founded and operated the Gulag History Museum, for which the Moscow administration provided a building in August 2001.

When he died in 2013, he was still working two full days a week to continue documenting what he called "the evils of the Soviet era" and to help with plans for a new, larger space.

He was buried in Moscow at the Novodevichy Cemetery.

== Views ==
A consistent anti-Stalinist, Anton regarded Stalin primarily as a “criminal”. He repeatedly advocated for the introduction of a provision in the Criminal Code of the Russian Federation criminalizing the propaganda of Stalinism. He also argued that in the Great Patriotic War the people prevailed in the tragic conflict “not thanks to Stalin, but in spite of him”.

== Bibliography ==
- The Time of Stalin: Portrait of a Tyranny, Harper & Row, 1981, ISBN 0-06-010148-2 (reprinted 1983)
- Theater of Joseph Stalin Moscow. "Grėgori-Pėĭdzh", 1995. ISBN 5-900493-15-6
- Enemy of the people, Moscow. Intellekt, 1996. Russian text online
- Beria Moscow, ACT, 1999, ISBN 5-237-03178-1 (in Russian) (PDF of the 2007 edition online)
- Naprasnyi podvig? (Vain feat?) Moscow: ACT, 2003. ISBN 5-17-017525-6 (in Russian)
