= Ukrainian Soviet Republic =

Socialist state in Europe, in 1918

Ukrainian Soviet Republic Українська Радянська Республіка (Ukrainian)
- 1918
- Flag Coat of arms
- Capital: Kharkiv; Taganrog
- Government: Soviet republic
- Chairman of the Sovnarkom
  - 1918: Mykola Skrypnyk
- Historical era: World War I
  - Established: 19 March 1918
  - Soviet forces withdrawn: 18 April 1918
  - Liquidation: 18 April 1918
Preceded by
Ukrainian People's Republic of Soviets
Odesa Soviet Republic
Donetsk–Krivoy Rog Soviet Republic
Succeeded by
Ukrainian People's Republic
Provisional Workers' and Peasants' Government of Ukraine
- Today part of: Ukraine; Russia

The Ukrainian Soviet Republic (Ukrainian: Українська Радянська Республіка, romanized: Ukrainska Radianska Respublika; Russian: Украинская Советская Республика, romanized: Ukrainskaya Sovetskaya Respublika) was a Soviet republic created by the Ukrainian Bolsheviks after the Second All-Ukrainian Congress of Soviets declared independence of Soviet Ukraine in March 1918 and merged the Ukrainian People's Republic of Soviets, the Odessa Soviet Republic, and the Donetsk–Krivoy Rog Soviet Republic into one state.

== History ==
The Ukrainian Soviet Republic and its government began on 24–25 December 1917 when in Kharkiv the First All-Ukrainian Congress of Councils (radas, soviets) was conducted, which declared the Ukrainian People's Republic of Soviets or Ukrainian SR. The congress decided in favour of an alliance with the Russian Soviet Federative Socialist Republic and elected its Central Executive Committee (Ukrainian: ЦВК).

It was reformed on March 19, 1918, at the Second All-Ukrainian Congress of Soviets in Yekaterinoslav, following the signing of the Treaty of Brest-Litovsk by the Russian Russian SFSR on March 3. After the victory of the Soviet government in Ukraine, the Ukrainian People's Republic was officially rebranded as the Ukrainian Soviet Republic and then the Ukrainian Socialist Soviet Republic (UkSSR) which became a co-founder of the Soviet Union.

Military forces of Soviet government of Ukrainian Republic of that time are known as Red Cossacks Army, later integral part of Red Army of the Soviet Union.

The USR united the Ukrainian People's Republic of Soviets, the Donetsk–Krivoy Rog Soviet Republic and the Odessa Soviet Republic as part of the Russian SFSR. It was soon overrun, however, by forces of the Central Powers and the Ukrainian People's Republic.

In March-April 1918, the capital was Taganrog. On April 18, 1918, in Taganrog, the next session of the Central Executive Committee of Soviets announced that the government of Soviet Ukraine, the Central Executive Committee of Ukraine and the People's Secretariat were now combined as the "Ukrainian Bureau" to guide the insurgent struggle against the German occupation.
