= Ukrainian Soviet Army =

Soviet Army military unit

- Українська радянська армія
- Active: November 30, 1918–June 1, 1919
- Country: Ukraine
- Allegiance: Ukrainian SSR
- Branch: Red Army
- Type: Army
- Size: 188,000
- Engagements: Soviet–Ukrainian War

Commanders
- Commander-in-chief: Vladimir Antonov-Ovseyenko

The Ukrainian Soviet Army (Ukrainian: Українська радянська армія, romanized: Ukrayinsʹka radyansʹka armiya) was a field army of the Red Army during the Russian Civil War, which existed between November 30, 1918, and June 1, 1919. It was officially the Army of the second formation of the Ukrainian Soviet Socialist Republic. The commander-in-chief was Vladimir Antonov-Ovseyenko and the Army counted 188,000 soldiers in May 1919. It operated from January 4, 1919, on the territory of Ukraine as part of the Ukrainian Front.

The Army was disbanded on June 1, 1919, and its formations came under command of Moscow, when the initial positive mood of the Ukrainian peasant soldiers had changed dramatically under the influence of the policy of War communism. This had led to rebellions in parts of the Ukrainian Red Army at the end of April - early May 1919, of which the most serious was that of the 6th Ukrainian Soviet Division, called the Hryhoriv Uprising.

== Commanders ==
=== Commander ===
- Vladimir Antonov-Ovseyenko

=== Members of the Revolutionary Military Council ===
- Volodymyr Zatonsky
- Fyodor Sergeyev

=== Chief of Staff ===
- Voldemar Aussem

== Sources ==
- The Civil War in Ukraine 1918–1920. Collection of documents and materials in three volumes, four books. Kiev, 1967.
- V. Antonov-Ovseyenko. Notes on the Civil War.
