= People's Secretariat =

Organisation (1917–1918)

People's Secretariat Народний секретаріат
Agency overview
- Formed: 1917
- Dissolved: 1918
- Jurisdiction: Ukrainian People's Republic of Soviets
- Headquarters: Kiev

The People's Secretariat of Ukraine (Ukrainian: Народний секретеріат, romanized: Narodnyi sekreteriat) was the executive body of the Provisional Central Executive Committee of Soviets in Ukraine. It was formed in Kharkiv on December 30, 1917, as a form of the Soviet concept of dual power by the Russian and other local Bolsheviks thus forming the Ukrainian Soviet government and the opposition to the Central Rada and the General Secretariat of Ukraine. The government claimed the same jurisdiction over Ukraine as the General Secretariat. The Central Executive Committee of Ukraine that was elected by the First All-Ukrainian Congress of Soviets canceled the declaration of independence, declared that Ukraine is in a federal subordination to the Russian SFSR, and called on to fight against the separatists, the Ukrainian Central Rada and the General Secretariat of Ukraine.

== Composition ==
All secretaries were members of the Russian Social Democratic Labour Party and the newly organized RSDRP(b) - Social-Democracy of Ukraine (RSDRP(b)-SDU) that was established on December 3, 1917, at the regional party congress in Kiev. The new party was directed by its Chief Committee (GK SDU) that was headed by Yevgenia Bosch. The government was elected at the 1st All-Ukrainian Congress of Soviets in Kharkiv.

At first no agreement was reached who would be heading the government, however it was decided that for the time being the chair will belong to the Secretary of Internal Affairs. The following Secretariat was located in Kharkiv and late January 1918 moved to Kyiv after the Red Army had captured the city.

Secretary	Dec 24 - Mar 17	Notes	Mar 17 - April	Notes
Internal Affairs	Yevgenia Bosch	presiding	Yevgeniy Neronovich	replaced with Yuriy Kotsyubinskiy
Military Commissars	Vasiliy Shakhrai	replaced with Yuriy Kotsyubynsky (Jan 12)	Yevgeniy Neronovich; Yuriy Kotsyubinskiy; Vladimir Antonov	
Labor Affairs	Nikolai Skrypnyk		Ivan Klimenko	
Finance	Vladimir Aussem		Vladimir Aussem	
International Affairs	Sergei Bakinsky	replaced with Ivan Kulyk	Vladimir Zatonskiy (acting)	replaced with Nikolai Skrypnyk
Agrarian Affairs	Yevgeniy Terletskiy		Yevgeniy Terletskiy	
Justice	Vladimir Lyuksemburg		Vladimir Lyuksemburg	
Education	Vladimir Zatonskiy		Vladimir Zatonskiy	
Trade / Industry	Fyodor Sergeyev		Nikolai Skrypnyk	presiding
Office Affairs	Ivan Kulyk	replaced with Georgiy Lapchinskiy	Georgiy Lapchinskiy	
Food Supply	Ye. Luganovskiy		Ye. Luganovskiy	
Transportation	Sergei Bakinsky		none	
Social Security	none		Georgiy Lapchinskiy	

On March 4, 1918, some changes took place in the cabinet as Bosch resigned in protest to the Brest-Litovsk Treaty and Mykola Skrypnyk was elected as the president of the People's Secretariat. Skrypnyk was also appointed the Secretary of Trade and Industry. The secretary of Internal Affairs was elected Yevhen Neronovych, Labor Affairs - Ivan Klymenko, Social Security - Georgiy Lapchinsky, Foreign Affairs - Volodymyr Zatonsky (temporarily). The Soviet government relocated to Yekaterinoslav and with the advance of the Central Powers to Taganrog in April 1918.

Later Ya. Martyanov (secretary of Postal and Telegraph) was added to the cabinet. On March 7, 1918, the Secretariat of Military Affairs was reformed into the triumvirate as the Petrograd sovnarkom and included Vladimir Antonov and Yevhen Neronovych. Antonov was appointed the Commander-in-Chief of the Soviet Ukrainian military.

Although the government had its own Secretariat of Internal Affairs the state security was conducted by the All-Russian Extraordinary Committee.

Both Bosch and Antonov took orders only from Lenin as the last one performed duties of People's Commissar of Russia and Ukraine. At the Second All Ukrainian Congress of Soviets (see Central Executive Committee of Ukraine) that took place in March 1918 with the advance of the Central Powers armed forces across Ukraine the People's Commissariat declared Soviet Ukraine independent from Soviet Russia. However, with the rapid advance of the forces of Central Rada and Central Powers, the Soviet government withdrew to Taganrog.

== Stalin vs. Skrypnyk ==
On April 4, 1918 Joseph Stalin telegraphed Volodymyr Zatonsky with the following:

I decisively protest against your policies involving the Don Oblast into the war with Germany. There cannot be and will not be any military union of southern republics and their common currencies. We already provided the Don Revkom with a directive to post a border patrol at their western border and they will execute it. We all here think that Cekuka (Note: Cekuka was the name for the Ukrainian Central Executive Committee with intention to differentiate it from the Russian counterpart.) has to and morally obligated to leave Taganrog and Rostov. Too much playing government and Republic, perhaps, it is enough, time to leave the game. Please, hand the copy of this note to the extraordinary commissar Sergo, Don Revkom, and Cekuka.

The next day Zatonsky sent the copy of that notice to the Ukrainian representative in Russia Mykola Skrypnyk. On April 6 Skrypnyk sent his answer to the Sovnarkom and the All Russian Central Executive Committee where he recited Stalin's words. He also mentioned that on April 3 the Sovnarkom accepted the Extraordinary delegation of the Ukrainian Soviet Federation and accepted the decision to recognize the People's Secretariat and the Ukrainian Republic. Further Skrypnyk said, "We have to announce the most decisive protest against the speech of Narkom Stalin. We have to announce that the Central Executive Committee and the People's Secretariat as motive for their actions do not reflect any particular attitudes to whichever Narkom of the Russian Federation, but rather only the will of the toiling masses of Ukraine that is presented in the declaration of the II All-Ukrainian Congress of Soviets. Announcements similar to the one presented by Stalin are directed to undermine the Soviet power in Ukraine and cannot be perceived by the representative of the Soviet government of neighboring republic. The toiling masses of Ukraine lead their struggle with their bourgeoisie counterrevolutionary independently from any decisions of whichever Sovnarkom of the Russian Federation, yet the Soviet power right now is undermined by the bayonets of the German troops. And if somebody dares to call the struggle of the Ukrainian toiling masses the game that is time to leave while in actuality the same masses of Ukraine think otherwise and those delegations that turn to us even from the occupied by Germans territories of Ukraine confirm that as the same struggle that is led by our forces. The friendly relationship to which the Soviet of People's Commissars of the Russian Federation joined in regards to the Ukrainian Republic request not to allow such announcements aimed to undermine the Soviet power in Ukraine and directed to the benefits of enemies of the Ukrainian toiling masses.

Selected groups and parts of the Russian Federation that fragment away from it (Crimea, Don, etc.) now propose to the Ukrainian People's Republic to create the South Soviet Federation. However the People's Secretariat has always tried to unite for the struggle against the Central Rada the toiling masses of localities at which that Central Rada has laid its eye and has no intentions to involve in its fight the Russian Federation nor its separate parts.

In regards to the request of Narkom Stalin for the People's Secretariat evacuated out of Taganrog, we only underline that Taganrog is part of the Ukrainian People's Republic and only the population of this territory can decide to which particular Soviet Federation it wish to belong: Russian or Ukrainian.

According to the above declared we're asking the government of Russian Federation to make appropriate explanations in regards to the announcement of Narkom Stalin and with that cancel the consequences of his announcement which so adversely may influence the struggle of the Ukrainian toiling masses for socialism.

Extraordinary Authorized Embassy of the Ukrainian Soviet Socialist Federation.

Chairman of People's Secretary M.Skrypnyk People's Secretaries Kotsiubynsky, Vrublevsky"

Note: The letter is translated from its original copy that can be found in the Ukrainian Central State Archives of the Supreme Bodies of Power.

== Further developments ==
On April 18, 1918, it was disbanded and reorganized together with the Central Executive Committee into the Povstanburo (Insurgency Bureau). The bureau consisted of nine members: four were Bolsheviks (Andriy Bubnov, Volodymyr Zatonsky, Heorhiy Pyatakov, Mykola Skrypnyk), four - left SRs (Serhiy Mstyslavsky, Opanas Sieverov-Odoyevsky, M.S
