= Ivan Kulyk =

Jewish-Ukrainian poet, writer and Communist party activist (1897–1937)

Ivan Kulyk Іван Кулик
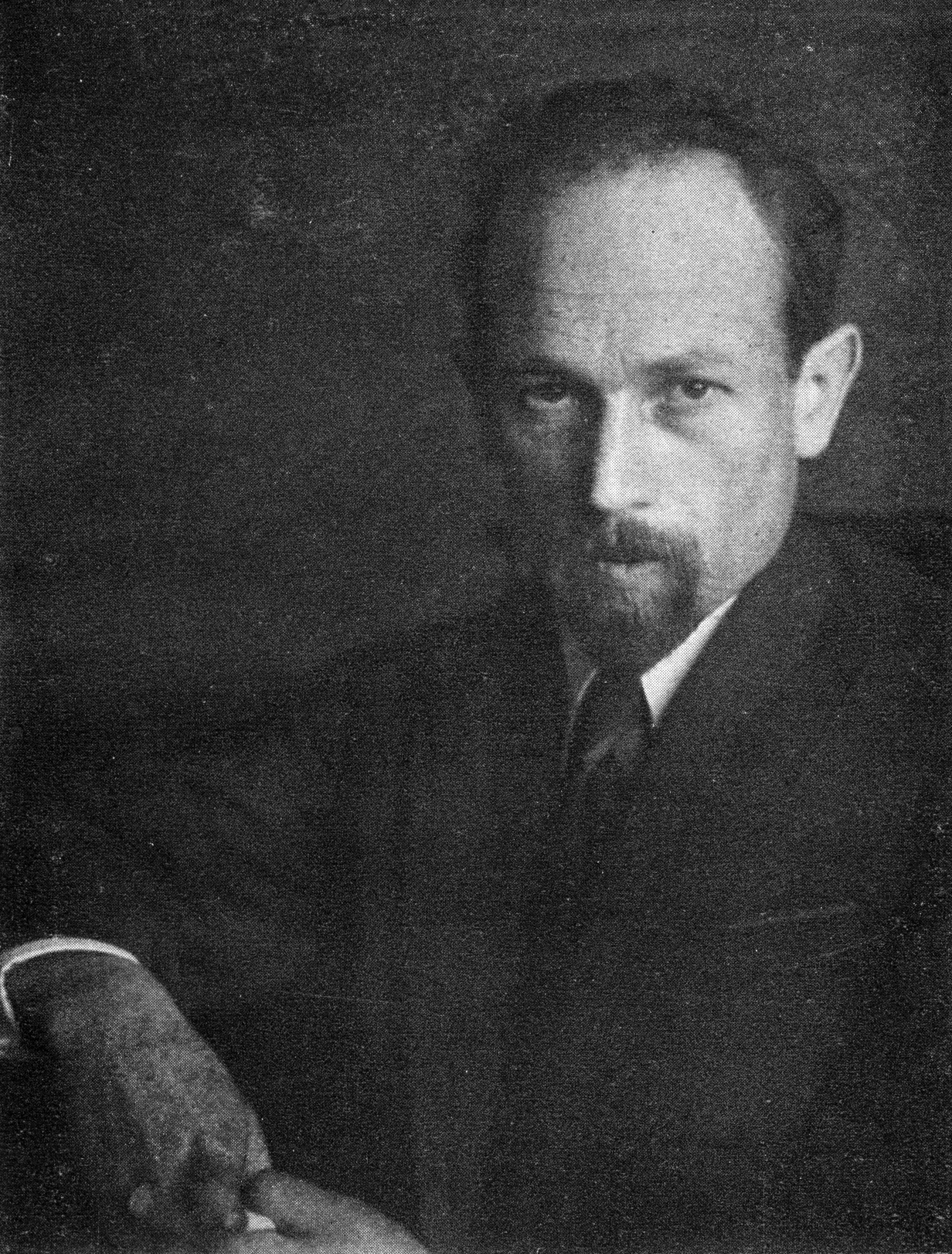
- Kulyk in 1928

People's Secretary on International Affairs (People's Secretariat)
- In office March 4, 1918 – March 17, 1918
- Prime Minister: Yevgenia Bosch
- Preceded by: Sergei Bakinsky (as Nationalities)
- Succeeded by: Volodymyr Zatonsky (as Foreign Affairs)

Writer's Union of Ukraine chairman
- In office 1934–1937
- Preceded by: post created
- Succeeded by: Oleksandr Korniychuk

Personal details
- Born: Izrail Yudelevych Kulyk; January 26, 1897 Shpola, Kiev Governorate, Russian Empire
- Died: October 10, 1937 (aged 40) Kyiv, Ukrainian SSR
- Party: RSDLP (Bolsheviks) (1914–1918); Russian Communist Party (1918–1937)
- Spouse: Luciana Piontek
- Education: Odesa Arts School

Ivan Yulianovych Kulyk (Ukrainian: Іван Юліанович Кулик; born Izrail Yudelevych Kulyk; January 14, 1897 – October 10, 1937) was a Ukrainian poet, writer, translator, diplomat and Communist Party activist. He also wrote under the names "R. Rolinato" and "Vasyl Rolenko".

== Biography ==
Kulyk was born in the city of Shpola, in the Kiev Governorate of the Russian Empire (now in Cherkasy Oblast, Ukraine) into the impoverished, religious family of a Jewish teacher. He finished fourth-grade college in Uman where he moved with his parents. There his first poem was published in the Uman newspaper Provincial voice ("Провинциальный голос"), in Russian.

In 1911 he enrolled into the Odesa Art academy. In 1914, together with his parents, he emigrated to the United States. There he worked in the factories and mines in Pennsylvania. He began publishing his poems in the local Russian newspaper New world ("Новый мир"). In 1914 he became a member of the Russian Social Democratic Labour Party (RSDLP).

In spring 1917 Kulyk travelled through the Russian Far East and Siberia, returning to Kyiv where he joined the local revkom. He actively participated in the Kyiv Bolshevik Uprising that led to the establishment of the Soviet government in Kyiv. In December 1917 he was elected to the Central Executive Committee of Soviets and the first Soviet government of the Ukrainian SSR (heading the People's Secretariat of the Foreign Affairs). In summer of 1918 together with Vitaliy Primakov participated in the formations of the Red Cossacks military units.

From May 1921 to May 1922 he was a secretary of the Kamianets-Podilskyi branch of the Communist Party (Bolshevik) of Ukraine. There he edited the local newspaper Red Truth, simultaneously teaching history in the Institute of the People's Education. At this time he published his poem the Green heart (1921, Ukrainian: Зелене серце).

In 1924–1926 he was consul of the Soviet Union in Canada. From September 15, 1930, to June 1932 he returned to Kamyanets-Podilsky as secretary of a raion committee.

He was one of the leaders of the All-Ukrainian Association of the Proletarian Writers (VSPP), and after 1934 became the leader of the Ukrainian Association of Soviet Writers. Along with those duties he also was head of the State Political Publishing house, edited in the Literary newspaper ("Літературнa газетa") and the journal Soviet Literature ("Радянська література").

He was married to the Ukrainian writer Luciana Piontek (1899–1937), an ethnic German.

He was arrested during the Great Purge in 1937, charged with "spying against the Soviet Union" and executed by shooting on October 10, 1937. Earlier, on September 25, 1937, his wife was executed as well for "supporting her husband in anti-state activities".
