= Vladimir Lyuksemburg =

Russian politician (1888–1971)

Vladimir Sergeyevich Lyuksemburg (30 October 1888 – 23 June 1971) was a Russian revolutionary and politician. He served as a member of the first Bolshevik government of Ukraine (People's Secretariat).

In 1918 and 1919, he was a member of collegium of the People's Commissariat of Propaganda and Agitation.
