= Mykola Skrypnyk =

Ukraninan revolutionary and Soviet politician

- Микола Скрипник
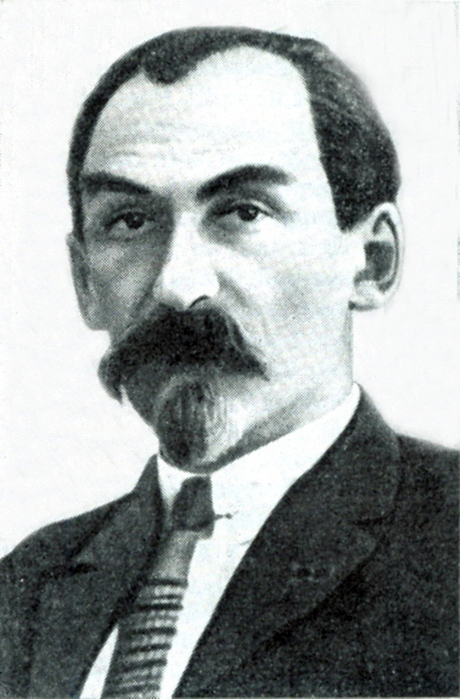

Chairman of the People's Secretariat of Ukraine
- In office 4 March 1918 – 18 April 1918
- President: Yukhym Medvedev; Volodymyr Zatonsky; (chairman of the Central Executive Committee)
- Preceded by: Yevgenia Bosch (acting)
- Succeeded by: Position abolished reorganized as The Uprising Nine

People's Secretary of Labor Affairs
- In office 4 March 1918 – 18 April 1918
- Prime Minister: Himself
- Preceded by: Position established
- Succeeded by: Position abolished

People's Commissar of Internal Affairs
- In office July 1921 – April 1922
- Prime Minister: Christian Rakovsky

People's Commissar of Justice
- In office April 1922 – 1927
- Prime Minister: Christian Rakovsky
- Preceded by: Mikhail Vyetoshkin
- Succeeded by: Vasyl Poraiko

Prosecutor General of Ukraine
- In office 1922–1927
- President: Grigory Petrovsky
- Preceded by: Position established
- Succeeded by: Vasyl Poraiko

People's Commissar of Education
- In office March 1927 – February 1933
- Prime Minister: Vlas Chubar

Head of Derzhplan UkrSSR
- In office February 1933 – 7 July 1933
- Prime Minister: Vlas Chubar
- Preceded by: Yakym Dudnyk
- Succeeded by: Yuriy Kotsiubynsky

Personal details
- Born: 25 January 1872 Yasynuvata, Yekaterinoslav Governorate, Russian Empire (now Ukraine)
- Died: 7 July 1933 (aged 61) Kharkiv, Ukrainian SSR, Soviet Union (now Ukraine)
- Party: RSDLP (1901–1903); RSDLP (Bolsheviks) (1903–1918); VKP(b) (1918–1933)
- Education: Saint Petersburg State Institute of Technology

Mykola Oleksiiovych Skrypnyk (Ukrainian: Микола Олексійович Скрипник; 25 January [O.S. 13 January] 1872 – 7 July 1933), was a Russian Bolshevik revolutionary and Communist leader who was a proponent of the Ukrainian Republic's independence, and later led the cultural Ukrainization effort in Soviet Ukraine. When the policy was reversed and he was removed from his position, he committed suicide rather than be forced to recant his policies in a show trial. He also was the Head of the Ukrainian People's Commissariat, equivalent to the modern-day position of Prime Minister of Ukraine.

== Early life and career ==
Skrypnyk was born in the village Yasynuvata of Bakhmut uyezd, Yekaterinoslav Governorate, Russian Empire in the family of a railway telegraph operator, assistant to the chief of the railway station; his mother worked as a midwife in the Zemstvo hospital.

At first he studied at the Barvinkove elementary school, then realschules of the cities Izium, from which he was expelled for revolutionary activities, and Kursk, which he graduated from in 1890. During his studies, he became acquainted with Ukrainian history and literature, in particular with the works of Taras Shevchenko and Panteleimon Kulish.

Originally a member of the Saint Petersburg Hromada society, Skrypnyk became a member of "Workers' Banner", part of the Marxist social democratic movement, in 1897. Skrypnyk joined the Russian Social Democratic Labour Party ("RSDLP") in 1898.

While studying at Saint Petersburg State Institute of Technology in 1901, he was arrested on political charges, prompting him to become a full-time revolutionary. Skrypnyk was eventually expelled from the institute.

He was arrested between fifteen and seventeen times, exiled seven times, and at one point was sentenced to death. He escaped from his first exile in the Yakut region, then worked as a social-democratic organizer and propagandist in Tsaritsyn (1902), Saratov (1902–1903), Samara and Yekaterinburg (1903), Odesa (1903–1904) and Katerynoslav (1904), from which he was exiled for five years to the Kem district of the Arkhangelsk Governorate. Skrypnyk escaped on the way to his exile and moved to Odesa.

In 1905, he was a party organizer of the Nevsky District of St. Petersburg, then the secretary of the Petersburg Committee of the RSDLP. He was elected as a delegate to the 3rd London Congress of the RSDLP in that year.

In October 1905, he became a member of the Riga Committee of the RSDLP. At the end of December 1905, he moved to Yaroslavl, where he was arrested and exiled for five years to the Turukhansky region. During this exile, he fled to the city of Krasnoyarsk, where he conducted the election campaign of the RSDLP to the Second State Duma of the Russian Empire. He was arrested and sent to Turukhansk, from which he soon escaped, having covered 1,200 versts, or an equivalent number of kilometers, by boat and on foot.

In the summer of 1908, he went to Geneva in Switzerland for a month and a half. After his return, he worked as a party organizer and a member of the Central Bureau of Trade Unions in Moscow. He was arrested and spent three months in a Moscow prison. After his release, he worked as a district organizer, secretary of the Moscow Committee of the RSDLP(b), and was dispatched on a campaign trip to the Urals.

At the end of 1908, he was arrested in St. Petersburg and exiled for five years to the Vilyuysky District of the Yakut region. He returned from exile at the end of 1913.

In 1913, Skrypnyk was an editor of the Bolsheviks' legal magazine Issues of Insurance and in 1914 was a member of the editorial board of the Pravda newspaper, while also working for Iskra. He used the party pseudonyms Glasson, Peterburzhets, Valerian, H. Yermolaev, Shchur, and Schensky.

In July 1914, he was arrested again, sentenced to administrative exile in the city of Morshansk, Tambov Governorate, where he worked as an accountant in a Morshanska bank.

== Russian Revolution ==
After the February Revolution, Skrypnyk was amnestied by the Provisional Government and moved to St. Petersburg (then called Petrograd), where he was elected as a secretary of the Central Council of Factories Committees. During the October Revolution, Skrypnyk was a member of the Military Revolutionary Committee of the Petrograd Soviet.

In December 1917, Skrypnyk was elected in absentia to the first Bolshevik government of Ukraine, the so-called People's Secretariat, in Kharkiv (Respublika Rad Ukrainy) as the People's Secretary of Labor. From February to March 1918, he was the People's Secretary of Trade and Industry of the Ukrainian People's Republic of Soviets. On March 3, 1918, he was elected president of the Secretariat, replacing Yevhenia Bosch, daughter of a German immigrant, who had resigned in protest against the Treaty of Brest-Litovsk. From March 8 to April 18, 1918, he also served as the People's Secretary for Foreign Affairs.

The Soviet Ukrainian government, under the onslaught of German troops, ended up in Katerynoslav, and later in Taganrog, where it ceased to exist. On March 17–19, 1918, the II All-Ukrainian Congress of Soviets was held in Katerynoslav, which proclaimed the independence of Soviet Ukraine. On April 18, 1918, Skrypnyk was elected a member of the All-Ukrainian Bureau to lead the insurgent struggle against the German occupiers. At the so-called Taganrog meeting (April 19–20, 1918), Skrypnyk was elected secretary of the Organizational Bureau for the 1st Congress of the Central Committee of the CP(b)U at its first congress held in Moscow (July 5–12, 1918), where he was the main speaker. But after the congress, he was removed from the leadership of the CP(b)U and left in Moscow.

Skrypnyk was a leader in the so-called Kyiv faction of the Ukrainian Bolsheviks, the independentists, sensitive to the issue of nationality, and promoting a separate Ukrainian Bolshevik party, while members of the predominantly Russian Katerynoslav faction preferred joining the All-Russian Communist Party in Moscow, according to Lenin's internationalist doctrine. The Kyiv faction won a compromise at a conference in Taganrog, Soviet Russia in April 1918, when the Bolshevik government was dissolved and the delegates voted to form an independent Communist Party (Bolshevik) of Ukraine, CP(b)U. But in July a Moscow congress of Ukrainian Bolsheviks rescinded the resolution and the Ukrainian party was declared a part of the Russian Communist Party.

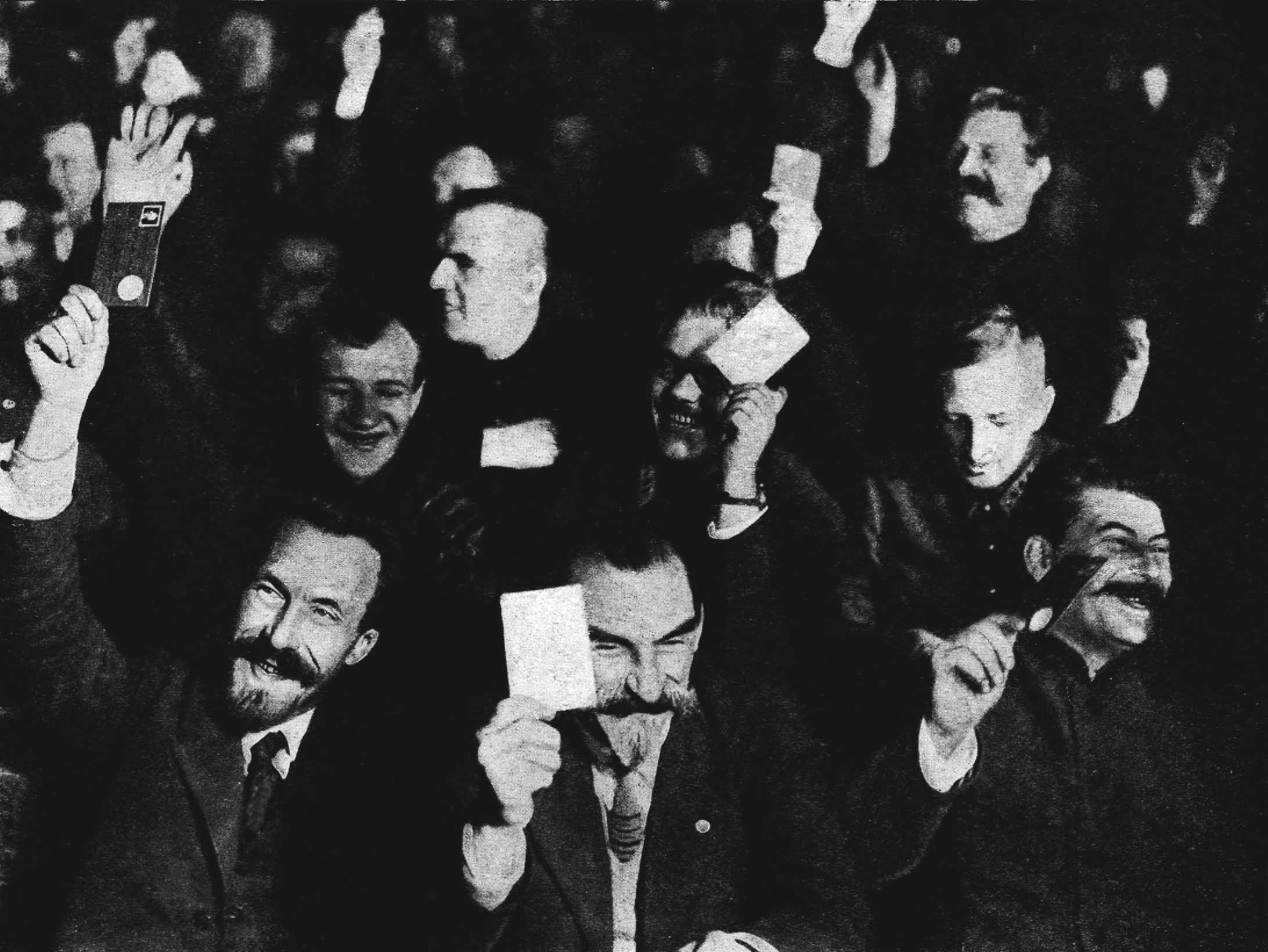
Front row: Rykov, Skrypnyk and Stalin voting at the 15th Congress of the All-Union Communist Party (Bolsheviks)

Skrypnyk worked for the Cheka secret police during the winter of 1918–19, then was the head of the special department of the Cheka of the South-Eastern and Caucasian Fronts. He returned to Ukraine, where he was a special commissioner of the Defense Council for combating the insurgent movement and led the suppression of the rebellion of Danylo Terpylo. He later served as People's Commissar of Worker-Peasant Inspection (1920–21) and Internal Affairs (1921–22).

During debates leading up to the formation of the Soviet Union in late 1922, Skrypnyk was a proponent of independent national republics and denounced the proposal of the new General Secretary, Joseph Stalin, to absorb them into a single Russian SFSR state as thinly-disguised Russian chauvinism. Lenin temporarily swayed the decision in favour of the republics, but after his death, the Soviet Union's constitution was finalized in January 1924 with very little political autonomy for the republics. Having lost this battle, Skrypnyk and other autonomists would turn their attention towards culture.

Skrypnyk was Commissar of Justice between 1922 and 1927 and the Commissar of Education of the USSR from March 7, 1927, to February 28, 1933. He was a member of the executive committee of the Communist International from September 1, 1928, to July 7, 1933.

== Ukrainization ==
Skrypnyk was appointed head of the Ukrainian Commissariat of Education in 1927. He convinced the Central Committee of the CP(b)U to introduce the policy of Ukrainization, encouraging Ukrainian culture and literature. He worked for this cause with almost obsessive zeal and, despite a lack of teachers and textbooks and in the face of bureaucratic resistance, achieved tremendous results during 1927–29. The Ukrainian language was institutionalized in the schools and society and literacy rates reached a very high level. As Soviet industrialization and collectivization drove the population from the countryside to urban centres, Ukrainian started to change from a peasants' tongue and the romantic obsession of a small intelligentsia into a primary language of a modernizing society.

Skrypnyk convened an international Orthographic Conference in Kharkiv in 1927, hosting delegates from Soviet and western Ukraine (former territories of Austria-Hungary, then part of the Second Polish Republic). The conference settled on a compromise between Soviet and Galician orthographies, and published the first standardized Ukrainian alphabet accepted in all of Ukraine. The Ukrainian orthography of 1928, also known as Kharkiv orthography or Skrypnykivka, was officially adopted in 1928.

Although he was a supporter of an autonomous Ukrainian republic and the driving force behind Ukrainization, Skrypnyk's motivation was what he saw as the best way to achieve communism in Ukraine, and he remained politically opposed to Ukrainian nationalism. He gave public testimony against "nationalist deviations" such as writer Mykola Khvylovy's literary independence movement, political anticentralism represented by former Borotbist Oleksandr Shumsky, and Mykhailo Volobuiev's criticism of Soviet economic policies which made Ukraine dependent on Russia.

From February to July 1933, Skrypnyk headed the Ukrainian State Planning Commission, became a member of the Politburo of the CP(b)U and served on the executive committee organizing the Communist International, as well as leading the CP(b)U's delegation to the Comintern.

== Purge and Dismissal ==
In January 1933, Stalin sent Pavel Postyshev to Ukraine, with free rein to centralize the power of Moscow. Postyshev, with the help of thousands of officials brought from Russia, oversaw the violent reversal of Ukrainization, enforced collectivization of agriculture, and conducted a purge of the CP(b)U, anticipating the wider Soviet Great Purge which was to follow in 1937.

Skrypnyk was removed as head of Education. In June, he and his "nefarious" policies were publicly discredited and his followers condemned as "wrecking, counterrevolutionary nationalist elements". Rather than recant, on 7 July he shot himself at his desk at his apartment in Derzhprom at Dzerzhynsky Square (Dzerzhynsky Municipal Raion of Kharkiv city).

During the remainder of the 1930s, Skrypnyk's "forced Ukrainization" was reversed.

He was rehabilitated in 1962.

== Personal life ==
His first wife, Maria Skrypnyk (maiden name Mezhova; 1883–1968) was a Bolshevik from pre-revolutionary times, a member of the Krasnoyarsk organization of the RSDLP, where they met. At the end of 1917 – the beginning of 1918, she worked as the secretary of the chairman of the Council of People's Commissars of the RSFSR Vladimir Lenin, in 1919–1920; she later served as a member of the collegium of the People's Commissariat of Land Affairs and the People's Commissariat of Social Security of the USSR, then worked as a teacher and authored her memoirs about Lenin. They separated in the 1920s, at which point she moved to Moscow, while he stayed in Kharkiv.

His second wife was Raisa Leonidivna Khavina (born in 1904, Gomel, in some sources her last name is given as Petrova), much younger than her husband. After Skrypnyk's death, she was arrested, but soon released. She moved to Moscow, where she worked as an engineer of the prescription commission of "Aniltrest". In 1938, she was arrested again and executed on August 20, 1938, and her son Mykola was sent to an orphanage; he died at the front during the war.

== See also ==
- People's Secretariat, the first government of the Soviet Ukraine

== Notes ==
Political offices
Preceded by introduced	Director of All-Ukrainian Institute of Marxism–Leninism; 1922–1930	Succeeded by Aleksandr Shlikhter
