= Yuriy Kotsiubynsky =

Ukrainian revolutionary and Soviet politician (1896–1937)

- Юрій Коцюбинський
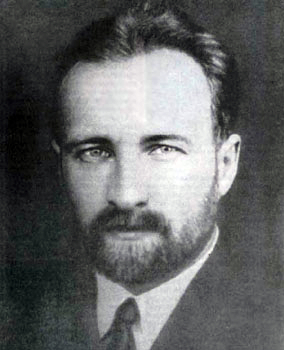

People's Secretary of Military Affairs (acting)
- In office December 1917 – March 7, 1918
- Prime Minister: Yevgenia Bosch; Mykola Skrypnyk
- Preceded by: Vasyl Shakhrai
- Succeeded by: Volodymyr Ovsiyenko

People's Secretary of Internal Affairs
- In office March 7, 1918 – April 18, 1918
- Prime Minister: Mykola Skrypnyk
- Preceded by: Yevgenia Bosch
- Succeeded by: position disbanded

Head of Derzhplan
- In office February 1934 – November 1934
- Prime Minister: Panas Lyubchenko
- Preceded by: Mykola Skrypnyk
- Succeeded by: Kyrylo Sukhomlyn

Personal details
- Born: December 7, 1896 Vinnytsia, Podolia Governorate
- Died: March 8, 1937 (aged 40) Kiev, Ukrainian SSR, Soviet Union
- Citizenship: Russia, Soviet
- Party: RSDLP (Bolsheviks) (1913–1918); Russian Communist Party (1918–1935)
- Spouse(s): Olha Petrovna Kotsybynska daughter of Petrovsky
- Children: Oleh

Yuriy Mykhailovych Kotsiubynsky (Ukrainian: Ю́рій Миха́йлович Коцюби́нський; Russian: Гео́ргий (Ю́рий) Миха́йлович Коцюби́нский; December 7, 1896 – March 8, 1937) was a Bolshevik politician, activist, member of the Soviet government in Ukraine, and one of the co-founders of the Red Cossacks Army of the Ukrainian Soviet Republic.

== Before the Revolution ==
Yuriy, like his father Mykhailo Kotsiubynsky, was born in Vinnytsia, Podolia Governorate. He studied in the Chernihiv Gymnasium. In 1913, Yuriy joined the Bolsheviks and in 1916 was mobilized into the Russian Imperial Army.

Later he studied in a military school for praporshchiks in Odessa and serving in Petrograd. In the capital, he led a series of anti-war agitations among soldiers, for which he was arrested on several occasions by the Provisional Government. There he also became a member of a military organization at the Petrograd Committee of Russian Social Democratic Labour Party (Bolshevik), a commissar of Semenovsky Guard Reserve Regiment, the Chief of Red Guard and commandant of the Moscow-Narva region (Petrograd).

== After the Revolution ==
With his future brother-in-law Vitaly Primakov Kotsiubynsky actively participated in the storming of the Winter Palace during the October Revolution. Later, he headed the Red Guard detachment of Moscow-Narva Distinct (Saint-Petersburg) against the forces of Kerensky – Krasnov, being also the commandant of the district. In December 1917 he became a deputy of People's Secretary of Military Affairs and later was acting as the Secretary. In January 1918 he became the Chief of Staff of the Soviet Ukrainian People's Republic and chairman of the military collegiate, nominally heading the army of the Petrograd Red Guards and Baltic Sailors in the fight against the national forces of the Ukrainian People's Republic which controlled Kyiv in February 1918. In reality the army was led by Muraviov who was subordinated to Vladimir Antonov-Ovseyenko.

In March 1918 Kotsiubynsky was elected to the Central Executive Committee (a.k.a. Tsikuka) and also was appointed as the People's Secretary of Internal Affairs. In July 1918 Kotsyubysnky joined the All Ukrainian Central Military revkom. Beginning in November 1918, he became a member of the reinstated Ukrainian Bolshevik government, the Provisional Workers–Peasants Government of Ukraine. During 1919–1920 Kotsiubynsky headed several regional party offices in Chernihiv and Poltava. From April to November 1919 he was a chairman of the Chernigov Governorate executive committee (governor). Starting in 1920 he held diplomatic missions to Austria and Poland until 1930. In 1922–23 he was a lecturer of Marxist courses at the Socialist Academy. In 1930 Kotsiubynsky became the deputy of head of Derzhplan; however in September 1933 he occupied the chair of Derzhplan and became the deputy chairman of the Ukrainian sovnarkom (Vice Prime Minister). During these last several years he was a member of the Central Committee of the Communist Party (Bolsheviks) of Ukraine and the All-Ukrainian Central Executive Committee.

== Arrest and Execution ==
In November 1934 Kotsiubynsky was removed from his position, losing his membership in the Central Committee. In February 1935, he was arrested while being charged with anti-Soviet activities and convicted by the decision of the Special Board of NKVD to six years of exile in the village of Kargasok, Western Siberia. In March 1935 he was expelled from the Party. In October 1936 Kotsiubynsky was arrested again while in exile and transferred to Kyiv. There, together with Vasyl Poraiko, Holubenko, Tytar, Tyrchuk, Volodymyr Lohinov and Pleskachevsky, he was charged with directing activities of a secret Trotskist center in Ukraine (Ukrainian Trotskyite Opposition) at the behest of Georgy Pyatakov.

On March 8, 1937, he was convicted by the Collegiate of the Soviet Supreme Court and executed by firing squad later the same day. In December 1955, he was rehabilitated.

There exists the Letter without envelope to Kotsiubynsky from Serhiy Okhrymenko in which the Ukrainian scientist blames him for bloody crimes against his own people.

...virtually he waged a war against the Central Rada, the commander-in-chief of the Russian Soviet Army Muraviov, who was really in charge and led the army, while Yu. Kotsyubynsky (secretary of military affairs) did not control any army having no influences on military actions and was only a Ukrainian label on Muraviov's bayonet....

(Pavlo Khrystiuk, Ukrainian historian)

| Preceded by office installed | Deputy of People's Secretary of Military Affairs; December 1917–December 1917 | Succeeded by office liquidated |
| Preceded by Mykola Skrypnyk | Head of Derzhplan; February 1934–November 1934 | Succeeded by Kyrylo Sukhomlyn |
