= Voldemar Aussem =

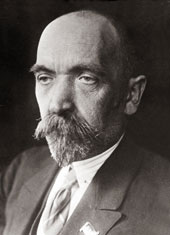
Voldemar Khristianovich Aussem

Voldemar or Vladimir Khristianovich Aussem (Russian: Влади́мир Христиа́нович А́уссем; Ukrainian: Володи́мир Христия́нович Ауссе́м; 14 July [O.S. 2 July] 1879 – after 1936) was a Russian nobleman and revolutionary, communist official and Soviet diplomat.

== Life ==
Aussem was born in Oryol into the family of a teacher and nobleman of Flemish origin.

From 1899 he studied at the Kharkov Institute of Technology until his arrest in 1901, the same year in which he joined the Russian Social Democratic Labour Party, after which he was sentenced to administrative exile in Oryol.

From 1914 until 1917 he served in the Russian Army, and after the October Revolution he served in various capacities of the communist hierarchy in Ukraine. On 30 November 1918 he became Chief of Staff of the Ukrainian Soviet Army, from 1919—1920 he was in the Revolutionary Military Council.

In 1921 he was posted to Berlin as the Plenipotentiary Representative of the Ukrainian Soviet Socialist Republic to Germany, until 16 July 1923 when the representation was switched to the People's Commissariat of Foreign Affairs, which saw him staying in Germany as Adviser to the Plenipotentiary of the USSR. On 21 May 1924 he was posted to Vienna as Plenipotentiary Representative of the Soviet Union in Austria, and stayed in the Austrian capital until 10 December 1924.

After the completion of his mission in Austria, he returned to the Ukrainian SSR and became Chairman of the Supreme Soviet of the National Economy in that Republic, until 1926 when he became the Trade Representative of the USSR in Turkey.

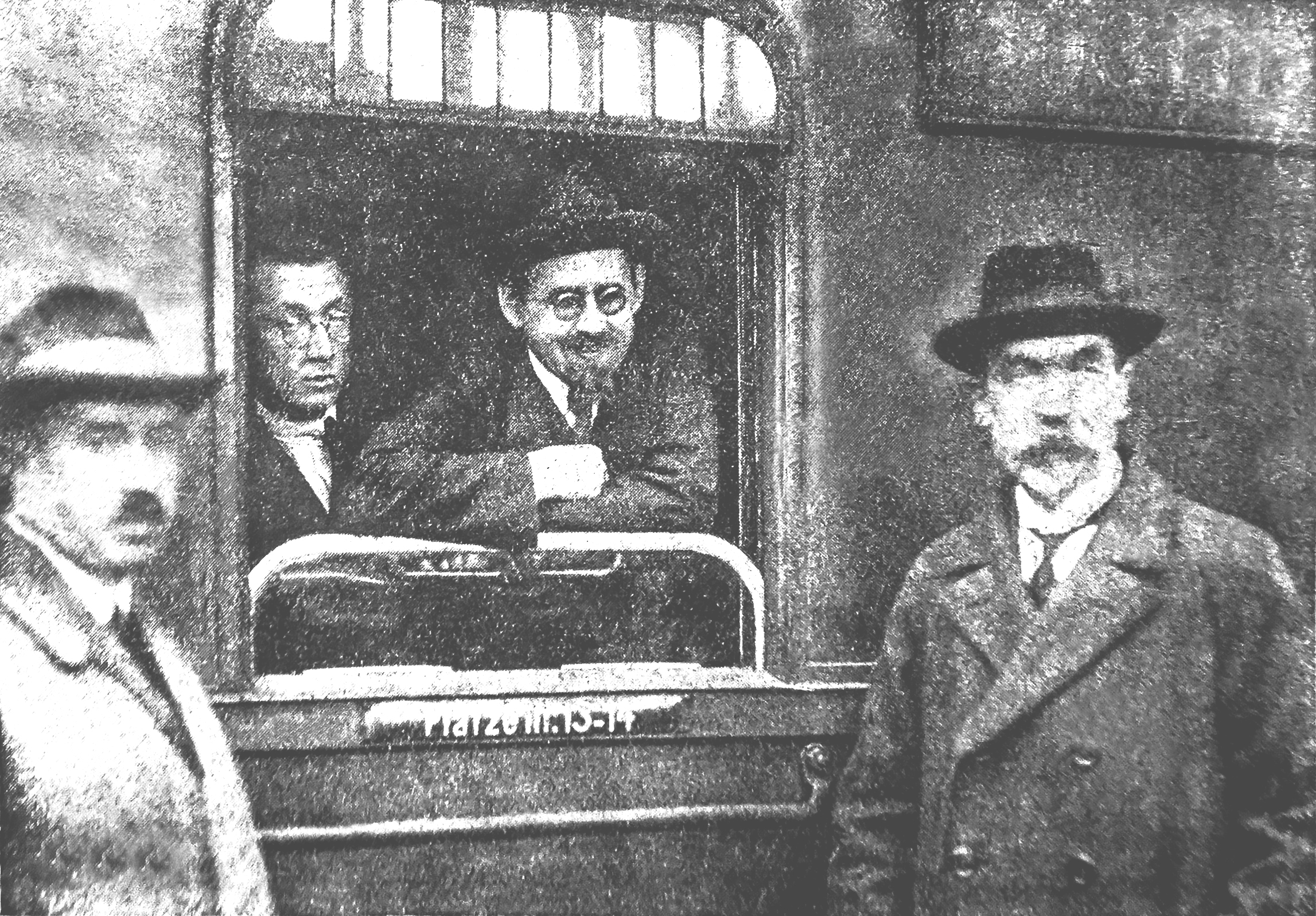
Nikolay Krestinsky, Deputy Trade representative Turov, and Voldemar Aussem (right) in Berlin, 1924

In December 1927 he was expelled from the All-Union Communist Party (bolsheviks), and at some stage became Scientific Secretary of the Krasnodar Regional Planning Commission until May 1929, when he was arrested, and sentenced in 1930 to 3 years exile in the Kazakh Autonomous Soviet Socialist Republic.

He was released in 1932, and became chief of the Chemical division of the Orlyov Sanitary Biological Institute, until his arrest again on 15 January 1933, whereby he was sentenced to another 3 years of exile in Astrakhan. He was released in 1936.

Aussem disappeared some time in 1937 while some sources claim he was shot.

He was rehabilitated in 1989.

== Depictions ==
- He is played by Oles Zadniprovsky in the 2018 film Tayemnyy shchodennyk Symona Petlyury
