= Vladimir Antonov-Ovseenko =

Soviet revolutionary and diplomat (1883–1938)

- Владимир Антонов-Овсеенко
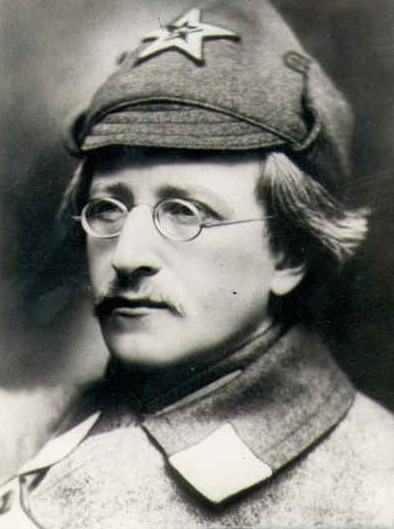
- Antonov-Ovseenko in 1919

People's Secretary of Military Affairs
- In office 7 March 1918 – 18 April 1918
- Preceded by: Yuriy Kotsiubynsky
- Succeeded by: Post dissolved Fyodor Sergeyev (All-Ukrainian Central MilRevKom)

Prosecutor General of the Russian SFSR
- In office 25 May 1934 – 25 September 1936
- Premier: Vyacheslav Molotov
- Preceded by: Andrey Vyshinsky
- Succeeded by: Nikolay Rychkov

People's Commissar for Justice of the Russian SFSR
- In office 16 September 1937 – 17 October 1937
- Preceded by: Ivan Bulat
- Succeeded by: Yakov Dmitriev

Personal details
- Born: Vladimir Alexandrovich Ovseenko; 9 March 1883 Chernigov, Chernigov Governorate, Russian Empire
- Died: 10 February 1938 (aged 54) Butyrka Prison, Moscow, Russian SFSR, Soviet Union
- Party: RSDLP (1902–1903); RSDLP (Mensheviks) (1903–1917); Russian Communist Party (Bolsheviks) (1917–1927), (1928–1938)
- Education: Vladimir Military Institute, Nikolaevsk Combat Engineer Institute

Military service
- Allegiance: Ukrainian People's Republic of Soviets (1917–1918); Ukrainian Socialist Soviet Republic (1918–1919); Russian Soviet Republic (1919–1921)
- Branch/service: Red Guards (1917–1918); Red Army (1918–1922)
- Years of service: 1917–1922
- Rank: Commander-in-chief
- Commands: Ukrainian Soviet Army (1917–1918); Ukrainian Front (1918–1919)
- Battles/wars: Russian Revolution; July Days; October Revolution; Russian Civil War; Civil War on the Don; Donbas-Don operation; Ukrainian–Soviet War; Aleksandrovsk Bolshevik Uprising; Soviet invasion of Ukraine; Battle of Kiev; Tambov Rebellion
- Vladimir Antonov-Ovseenko's voice Recorded in 1923

Vladimir Alexandrovich Antonov-Ovseenko (Russian: Влади́мир Алекса́ндрович Анто́нов-Овсе́енко; Ukrainian: Володи́мир Олекса́ндрович Анто́нов-Овсі́єнко; 9 March 1883 – 10 February 1938), real surname Ovseenko, party aliases 'Bayonet' (Штык) and 'Nikita' (Никита), literary pseudonym A. Galsky (А. Гальский), was a prominent Bolshevik leader, Soviet statesman, military commander, and diplomat. He was executed during the Great Purge.

== Early years ==
He was born in Chernigov, the son of an infantry officer and nobleman. He was an ethnic Ukrainian.

In 1901, he graduated from the Voronezh Cadet Corps and entered the Nikolaev Military Engineering School, but refused to swear “allegiance to the Tsar and the Fatherland,” later explaining this by "an organic aversion to militarism". After a week and a half of arrest he was expelled. Antonov-Ovseenko then joined a student Marxist circle in Warsaw. As he himself wrote: “At the age of 17, I broke with my parents, because they were people of old, royal views, I did not want to know them anymore. Blood ties are worth nothing, if there are no other ones.”

In 1902 he graduated from the military college in Saint Petersburg.

In the spring of 1902, he went to Saint Petersburg, where he worked first as a laborer in the Alexandrovsky port, and then as a coachman in the "Society for the Protection of Animals". In the autumn of 1902, he entered the St. Petersburg Infantry Cadet School. He secretly joined the Russian Social Democratic Labour Party (RSDLP) and set about organising a military section of the party among graduate officers in five cities. In August 1904, he graduated from the school and was posted as a second lieutenant in the 40th Kolyvan Infantry Regiment, stationed in Warsaw.

== Participation in the 1905 Russian Revolution ==
In the spring of 1905, during the Russo-Japanese War, he was assigned to service in the Far East, but instead deserted, choosing instead to go underground. He was helped, according to his own recollections, by local Social Democrats; in particular, Yakov Ganetsky. Antonov-Ovseenko thus went to Kraków and Lwów, at that time part of Austria-Hungary, staying in touch with his comrades in Poland. After some time, he illegally returned to Poland and, together with Felix Dzerzhinsky, tried to organize a military uprising of two infantry regiments and an artillery brigade in Novo-Alexandria, which ended in failure. Antonov-Ovseenko was arrested and placed in a Warsaw prison, from which he managed to escape.

The details of his escape are described in the report of the head of the Warsaw prison castle:

"Today, at 17:30, Vladimir Antonov-Ovseenko escaped from the prison entrusted to my guard, whose case is scheduled for hearing tomorrow in a military field court. The circumstances under which the daring escape was accomplished are as follows. During a walk in the courtyard, Antonov-Ovseenko obtained permission to conduct "sports exercises". These sports exercises, however, were nothing more than a pre-thought-out and prepared escape plan, which Antonov-Ovseenko carried out during the "leapfrog formation", in which one of the prisoners jumps on the back of another, forming a "ladder". Then the prisoners comically fell to the ground, which created a good-natured mood among the guards. After ten minutes of this game, Antonov-Ovseenko, having lulled the guards' vigilance completely, turned the direction of the "leapfrog" from a single tree to the prison wall. After the third time he climbed on his back, Antonov-Ovseenko jumped over the wall..."

Antonov-Ovseenko again moved to Austria-Hungary, from where he was sent by a local Menshevik émigré group to St. Petersburg, where he arrived in early May. He became a member of the St. Petersburg Committee of the RSDLP and chair of its military organisation, which was engaged in agitation among military personnel.

At the end of June, he was arrested in Kronstadt, using a false name, which helped him avoid a court martial. In October 1905, he was released under an amnesty following the announcement of the October Manifesto, although his real name remained unclear. Antonov-Ovseenko hid in Moscow following his release.

== Years underground and in exile ==
In 1906, he tried to organize an uprising in Sevastopol, for which he was arrested again after offering armed resistance. A year later he was sentenced to death, subsequently reduced to 20 years of hard labor. In June 1907, just before being sent to Siberia, he escaped with a group of 15–20 prisoners by blowing up the prison wall. After first hiding in Finland, he then worked underground in St. Petersburg and Moscow, sheltered in the home of a sympathetic lawyer, Pavel Malyantovich, specializing in revolutionary agitation among military personnel and with the printers' union in Moscow.

In 1909, he was arrested again, but not identified, and spent six months in prison, from where he was released under a false name. In mid-1910, he illegally left Russia for Prussia, from which he was deported, ultimately settling in Paris, where he acted as secretary of the Menshevik bureau.

Soon after the outbreak of World War I, Antonov-Ovseenko broke with the Mensheviks, and founded the anti-war paper Golos (Голос, 'Voice'), later renamed Nashe Slovo (Наше слово, 'Our Word'), which he co-edited with Leon Trotsky and Julius Martov. Trotsky commented on Antonov-Ovseenko in his memoirs of that period:

Antonov-Ovseenko is an impulsive optimist by nature, much more capable of improvisation than calculation. As a former junior officer, he had some military information. During the Great War, as an emigrant, he led a military review in the Parisian newspaper Nashe Slovo and often demonstrated strategic insight.

== Revolutionary activity in 1917 ==
Antonov-Ovseenko returned to Russia in June 1917, joining the Bolsheviks upon his arrival. As a member of the Military Organization under the Central Committee of the RSDLP(b), Antonov-Ovseenko was sent to Helsingfors (Helsinki) to conduct propaganda work among the soldiers of the Northern Front and the sailors of the Baltic Fleet. He was briefly head of the party organisation in Helsingfors and Chairman of the Northern Congress of Soviets. At the same time, he edited the newspaper Volna.

After the July Days, he was arrested by the Provisional Government and imprisoned, with Trotsky, in Kresty prison, where, together with Fyodor Raskolnikov, on behalf of the arrested Bolsheviks, he drafted a written protest against their arrests. After being released on bail on September 4, 1917, the day that the right wing military revolt led by General Kornilov collapsed, Antonov-Ovseenko returned to Helsingfors when Tsentrobalt appointed him as a commissioner to the Governor-General of Finland.

Antonov-Ovseenko returned to Petrograd in October 1917 following the October Revolution and was appointed secretary of the Military Revolutionary Committee of the Petrograd Soviet. Trotsky, who witnessed him in action, described him as "politically shaky, but personally courageous – impulsive and disorderly, but capable of initiative..." John Reed recalled in his book Ten Days That Shook the World: "In a certain upstairs room sat a thin-faced, long-haired individual, once an officer in the armies of the Tsar, then revolutionist and exile, a certain Avseenko, called Antonov, mathematician and chess-player; he was drawing careful plans for the seizure of the capital."

As part of the "operational troika" (together with Nikolai Podvoisky and Grigoriy Chudnovsky), he prepared the capture of the Winter Palace. In his report at the meeting of the Petrograd Soviet on October 23, 1917 he reported that the Petrograd garrison as a whole was in favor of transferring power to the Soviets, the Red Guards had occupied arms factories and warehouses and were arming themselves with captured weapons, the outer ring of Petrograd defense had been strengthened, and the ability of the headquarters of the Petrograd Military District and the Provisional Government to respond to the actions of the Bolsheviks had been paralyzed.

He personally led the famous storming of the Winter Palace on 7 November (25 October according to the Julian Calendar still used in Russia at the time), when Red Guards broke into the building where ministers of the Russian Provisional Government (other than Prime Minister Alexander Kerensky), had taken refuge, and arrested them. They included Kerensky's Minister for Justice, Pavel Malyantovich, who had given Antonov-Ovseenko sanctuary ten years earlier.

There were no lives lost in the incident, which took on something of a mythical status in Soviet history. The Soviet authorities reenacted it three years later in a mass spectacle involving more than a thousand actors and extras that was viewed by 100,000 spectators. It also provided the climax of the classic 1928 silent movie October, directed by Sergei Eisenstein, in which Antonov-Ovseenko took a starring role, playing himself.

Antonov-Ovseenko reported to the deputies on the imprisonment of the ministers of the Provisional Government in the Peter and Paul Fortress at the Second All-Russian Congress of Soviets, which was taking place at that time on 26 October 1917. He was appointed to the Military Committee of Sovnarkom under the Council of People's Commissars at that Congress.

== Participation in the Civil War ==
Antonov-Ovseenko was sent to lead the Bolshevik side in the first, relatively bloodless engagement of the civil war at Gatchina, against Kerensky and a detachment of Cossacks led by Pyotr Krasnov, but had to be replaced after he virtually collapsed from nervous exhaustion.

On 21 December 1917, Antonov-Ovseenko was put in charge of the Revolutionary forces in Ukraine and southern Russia fighting the Cossacks of Ataman Alexey Kaledin and the Ukrainian units of the Russian Army that supported the Ukrainian Central Rada. The Red Army subsequently captured Kharkiv, where the new Soviet administration in Ukraine was proclaimed.

He opposed Lenin's decision to end the war with Germany under the Treaty of Brest-Litovsk and was dismissed from the Red Army in May 1918 for fomenting guerrilla warfare against the advancing German army. He was reinstated as People's Commissar for War in Ukraine in September 1918. During this campaign, Antonov-Ovseyenko ordered the execution of the Tsarist General Paul von Rennenkampf after he refused to serve the Bolsheviks and command a communist unit of the Red Army.

At the end of April 1919, Antonov-Ovseenko made an attempt to reach an agreement with Nykyfor Hryhoriv, the self-declared Otaman of the insurgent forces of "the land of Kherson, Zaporizhzhia and Taurida". Hryhoriv commanded the largest grouping of troops on the front and had already switched allegiance several times since the October Revolution, most recently agreeing to support the Ukrainian Soviet Socialist Republic and to transform his troops into regular units of the Red Army.

Hryhoriv complained to Antonov-Ovseenko about the Bolsheviks's policy of war communism, which conscripted Ukrainian peasants into the Red Army and requisitioned food supplies. Antonov-Ovseenko, who had also criticized war communism and had observed the mood among his soldiers, decided to persuade Hryhoriv to continue his service in the Red Army by entrusting him with the prestigious mission of marching to Bessarabia, convincing him that winning victories over the Romanian troops in Bessarabia and intervening in Hungary would ensure him enormous personal fame. On 23 April, Hryhoriv agreed to carry out these orders.

Hryhoriv did not march on Bessarabia. Immediately after Antonov-Ovseenko left, Hryhoriv's soldiers started looting and attacking the Jewish population and communist officials. At the same time, in the Kherson Governorate, where Hryhoriv's forces were stationed, mass peasant riots began against forced food requisitions and repression by Cheka officials.

While Hryhoriv's forces captured a number of Ukrainian cities in May, they were eventually routed by the Red Army under the command of Kliment Voroshilov. Hryhoriv was assassinated by his ally Nestor Makhno, who feared that Hryhoriv would go over to the Whites. Hryhoriv's failed uprising had, however, largely thwarted Soviet plans to march to Bessarabia, join the region to the Soviet state, and then intervene in Hungary and extend the communist revolution to Romania.

By the end of the Russian Civil War, Antonov-Ovseenko was in charge of the Tambov Governorate, brutally suppressing the 1920–21 Tambov Rebellion, alongside Mikhail Tukhachevsky, with the use of chemical weapons. In 1921, he was put in charge of famine relief in the Samara region.

== Political career ==
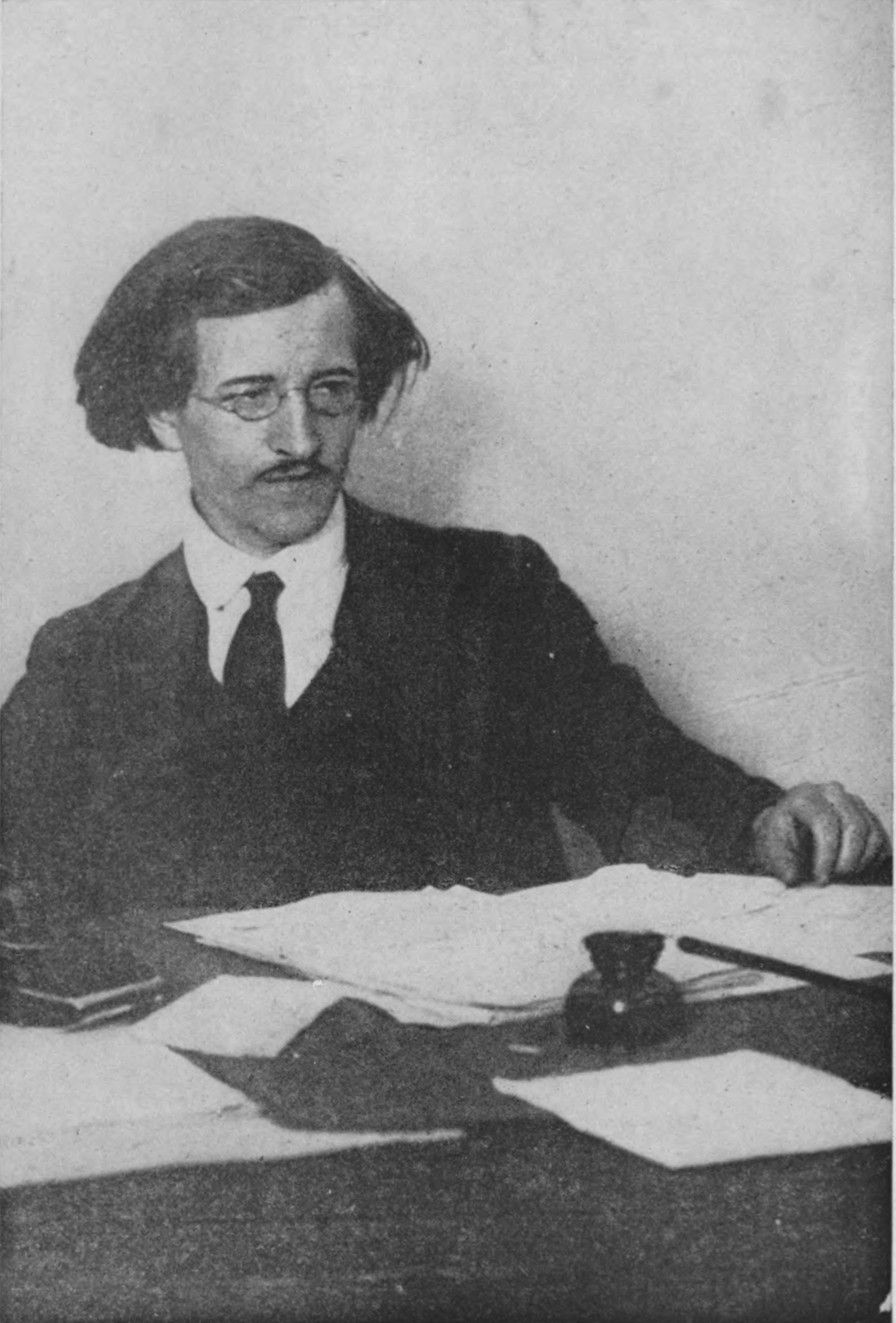
Antonov-Ovseenko at his office

In 1922, Antonov-Ovseenko was given the highly sensitive post of head of the Political Directorate of the Red Army, despite his public opposition to Lenin's New Economic Policy, which he denounced in a speech to the April 1922 Congress of the Russian Communist Party (Bolsheviks) (CPSU) as a betrayal of the peasants. Following the terminal velocity of Lenin's health and final illness, he backed Trotsky in the struggle for succession. He was a signatory of The Declaration of 46 in October 1923, which called for greater party democracy within the Party.

In December, after one of his subordinates had been sacked for criticising the leadership of the Bolsheviks, he wrote an angry letter to the Central Committee exclaiming that "we are not courtiers to the throne of party hierarchs!" He also warned that "if Trotsky is touched, the entire Red Army will rise to the defense of the Soviet Carnot" and that the army would be able to "call the presumptuous leaders to order." In January 1924, he was summoned before the Orgburo, which was controlled by Joseph Stalin, and sacked.

== Diplomatic and judicial career ==
Later in 1923, Antonov-Ovseenko was sent on a mission to China – the start of an 11-year career as a diplomat. In 1925, he was recalled and appointed as the Soviet representative in Czechoslovakia. He was one of a large group of Trotsky's supporters expelled from the CPSU in December 1927, but was one of the first to recant and seek readmission to the party during 1928.

Later he was envoy in Lithuania (since 1928) and Poland (since 1930), but in May 1934 was recalled to Moscow to serve as a Public Prosecutor. In this capacity, he participated in the first of the great Moscow show trials, in which Grigory Zinoviev and Lev Kamenev were the main defendants, and signed an article in Izvestia calling for them to be shot. As prosecutor, Ovseenko helped establish the practice of sentencing "according to proletarian necessity".

He was then posted to Barcelona, as the Soviet Consul General, during the Spanish Civil War. In this role, he directed the supply of Soviet aid to the Second Spanish Republic, provided military guidance to Republican forces, and helped bring about the repression of the POUM party by threatening to withdraw the USSR's support for the Republic if POUM were not excluded from the ruling coalition.

== Arrest, execution and rehabilitation ==
During the intensification of Stalin's mandate to purge the Bolshevik party of alleged spies and Trotskyite counter-revolutionaries, Antonov-Ovseenko was recalled to Moscow. After a month without a job, Antonov-Ovseenko was appointed People's Commissar for Justice of the Russian SFSR in September 1937. But, after just one month in that post, he was arrested during the night of 11–12 October 1937 and interrogated.

He was tried "for belonging to a Trotskyist terrorist and espionage organization". He was sentenced to death on February 8, 1938, shot on February 10, 1938, and buried at the Kommunarka firing range. His wife had been shot two days earlier.

Antonov's cellmate recalled: "When he was summoned to be shot, Antonov began to say goodbye to us, took off his jacket and shoes, gave them to us, and half-naked went to be shot. ... 21 years ago, with his hat askew, his hair down to his shoulders, he declared the Provisional Government deposed. Now he was being led barefoot to the firing squad." According to Mikhail Tomsky's son Yuri, as recounted by Giuseppe Boffa and Robert Conquest, before his death Antonov-Ovseenko said the words: "I ask whoever lives to see freedom to tell people that Antonov-Ovseenko was a Bolshevik and remained a Bolshevik until his last day."

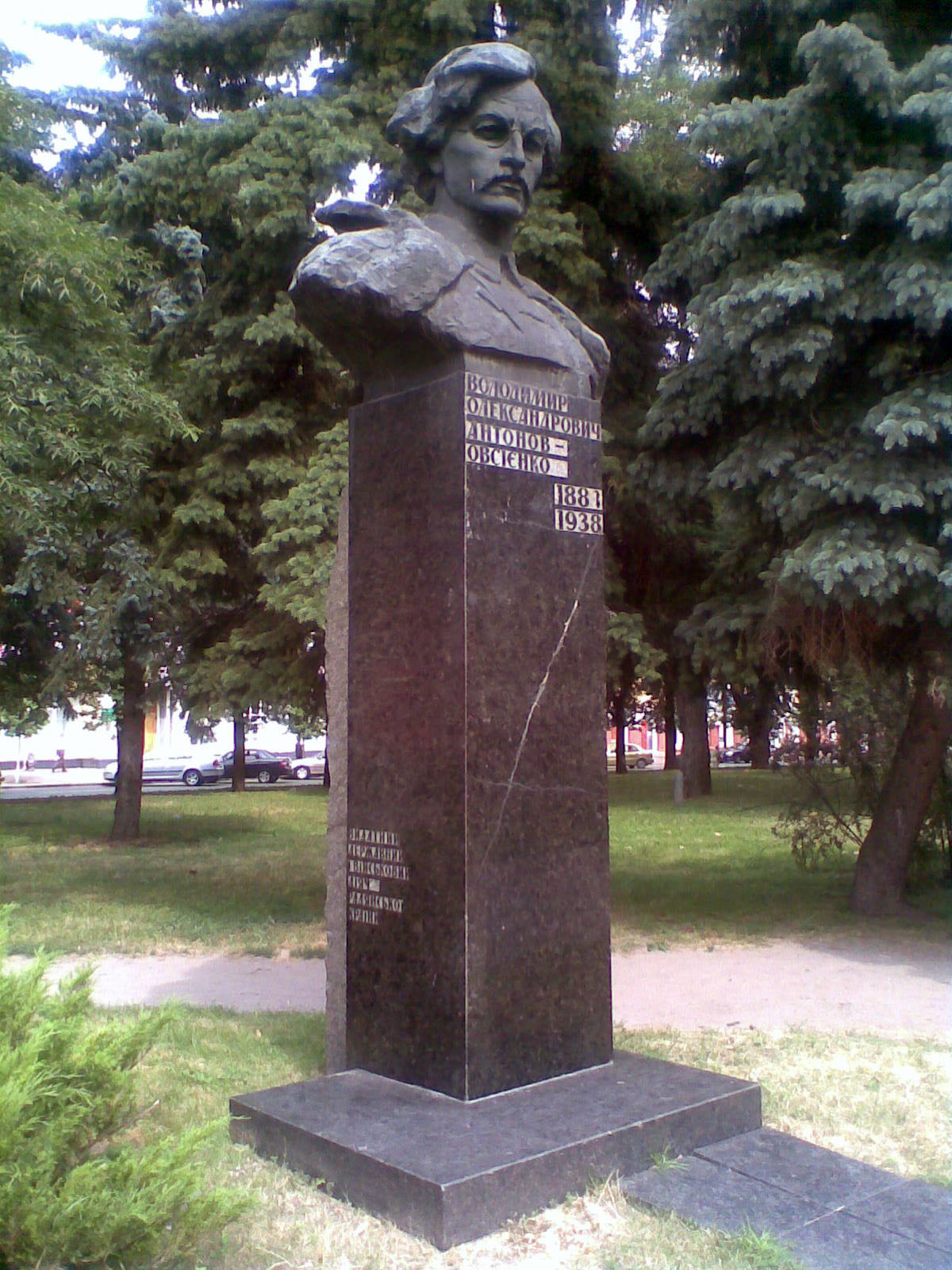
Monument of Antonov-Ovseenko in Chernihiv, removed in 2015

He was posthumously rehabilitated on February 25, 1956. Antonov-Ovseenko was the first former Trotskyist to be posthumously rehabilitated, and in 1956 was named in a speech by Anastas Mikoyan to the 20th party congress of the CPSU. Later, his son Anton, a historian, feared that his father was to be "un-rehabilitated", and fought a long and contentious battle to protect his father's reputation.

== See also ==
- Outline of the Russian Revolution and Civil War
- Bibliography of the Russian Revolution and Civil War
- Bibliography of Stalinism and the Soviet Union
- Index of Old Bolsheviks
- Index of articles related to the Russian Revolution and Civil War
- Albert Rhys Williams, American journalist who wrote a number of books about the revolutionary activities in Petrograd of 1917–18, of which he was eyewitness. He mentioned Ovseenko as the military leader of the October Revolution. He visited the Soviet Union again on several occasions before World War II.
- Anton Antonov-Ovseenko (1920–2013), historian and writer, his son
