= Yevgenia Bosch =

Ukrainian revolutionary and politician (1879–1925)

- Євгенія Бош
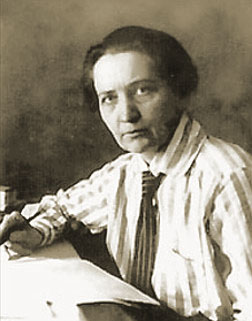

People's Secretary of Internal Affairs
- In office 30 December 1917 – 1 March 1918
- Preceded by: Position established
- Succeeded by: Yuriy Kotsiubynsky

Chairwoman of the People's Secretariat (acting)
- In office 30 December 1917 – 1 March 1918
- Preceded by: Position established
- Succeeded by: Mykola Skrypnyk

Personal details
- Born: Yevgenia Gotlibovna Meisch; 3 September [O.S. 22 August] 1879 Adjigiol, Kherson Governorate, Russian Empire (today Mykolaiv Oblast, Ukraine)
- Died: 5 January 1925 (aged 45) Moscow, Russian SFSR, Soviet Union (today Russia)
- Party: RSDLP (1901–1912); VKP(b) (1912–1925)
- Spouse(s): Peter Bosch; Georgy Pyatakov
- Children: two daughters: Olha Kotsyubynska ?
- Education: Voznesensk Female Gymnasium (1903)

Yevgenia Bogdanovna (Note: Bosch had two patronyms – the Slavic Bogdanova and the German Gotlibovna (Ukrainian: Готлібівна, romanized: Hotlibivna; Russian: Го́тлибовна)) Bosch (Note: Ukrainian: Євгенія Богданівна Бош, romanized: Yevheniia Bohdanivna Bosh; Russian: Евге́ния Богда́новна Бош; German: Jewgenija Bogdanowna Bosch) (Note: Also transliterated from Russian/Ukrainian as Bosh.) (née Meisch (Note: Russian and Ukrainian: Майш, romanized: Maysh); 3 September [O.S. 22 August] 1879 – 5 January 1925) was a Ukrainian Bolshevik revolutionary, politician, and member of the Soviet government in Ukraine during the revolutionary period in the early 20th century.

Yevgenia Bosch is sometimes considered the first modern woman leader of a national government, having been Minister of Interior and the Acting Leader of the provisional Soviet government of Ukraine in 1917. For that reason she is also sometimes considered the first Prime Minister of independent Ukraine.

== Early life and family ==
Officially, Bosch was born 3 September [O.S. 22 August] 1879 in Adjigiol village near Ochakiv, in the Kherson Governorate of the Russian Empire, but some records report that she was born in Ochakiv, Kherson Governorate in a family of a German colonist, mechanic, and landowner Gotlieb Meisch, and Bessarabian noblewoman Maria Krusser. Yevgenia Bosch was the fifth and youngest child in the family. Soon after the death of Gotlieb Meisch, Maria Krusser married her husband's brother, Theodore Meisch.

For three years, Yevgenia attended Voznesensk Female Gymnasium, after which, due to a health condition, she worked for her stepfather as a secretary. Being stuck in her parents' household, Yevgenia sought the means to leave. Her older brother Oleksiy acquainted her with his friend Peter Bosch, who was an owner of a local small wagon shop. At 16, Yevgenia married Bosch, and later gave birth to two daughters.

According to another source, Yevgenia Bosch was born in Ukraine to Gottlieb Meisch, an ethnic German immigrant from Luxembourg, and his Moldavian wife. Bosch's parents quarrelled often and her childhood was reportedly an unhappy one. She was educated at the Voznesensk women's gymnasium. At age 17, her parents attempted to arrange a marriage to an older man, but she rebelled and married a bourgeois businessman named Peter Bosch. They had two children.

== Radical politics ==
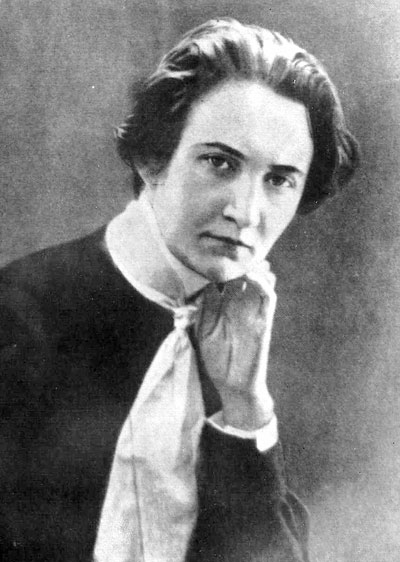
Yevgenia Bosch

Bosch had a growing interest in radical politics. She had limited involvement with the Social Democrats. In 1901, at 22, she became a member of the Russian Social Democratic Labour Party (RSDLP) and after the II Party Congress joined the Bolshevik faction in 1903. She tried to educate herself while raising her two daughters.

In the meantime, her younger sister, Elena Rozmirovich, was a dedicated revolutionary. The Bosch house was searched by the police for illegal political literature in 1906. The police search was unsuccessful, but Bosch left her husband and fled to Kyiv, where she joined the revolutionary underground. In 1907, she divorced her husband and moved to Kyiv where Bosch lived at vulytsia Velyka Pidvalna, 25 (today vulytsia Yaroslaviv Val).

In Kyiv, she established contact with the local Bolshevik faction, and together with her younger sister Elena Rozmirovich (future wife of Nikolai Krylenko, Chekist), conducted underground revolutionary activities. Much of the Kyiv group was arrested and exiled in 1910, but Bosch remained in Kyiv and found a lover and revolutionary partner in Georgy Pyatakov. Bosch was head of the Kyiv Committee of the Russian Social Democratic Worker's Party (RSDRP). Bosch and Pyatakov led the Kyiv committee until their arrest and exile to Irkutsk Governorate Siberia in 1912. During her imprisonment, she fell ill with tuberculosis.

Alongside Pyatakov, Bosch managed to escape from Kachuga volost (Upper-Lena uyezd, Irkutsk Governorate), first to Vladivostok, and then, with a short stint in Japan, to the United States.

Afterwards, Bosch and Pyatakov made their way to Switzerland where an émigré group of revolutionaries was active. Bosch accepted Lenin's invitation and attended the conference of Russian revolutionaries in Bern in 1915 (the Bern conference). She was initially opposed to Lenin's desire to urge the proletariat towards revolution. Still in Switzerland, together with Georgy Pyatakov they established the so-called Baugy group (Baugy is a suburb of Lausanne), which included Nikolai Bukharin, Nikolai Krylenko and others, and stood in opposition to Lenin concerning the nationalities factor. Her newspaper Social Democratic Voice argued:

We believe that the development of productive forces and social power of the proletariat have not reached the level at which the working class could carry out the socialist revolution.

Afterwards she lived for some time with Pyatakov in Stockholm, Sweden, and in Oslo, Norway (then called Christiania).

After the February Revolution, Bosch and Pyatakov were among the first Bolshevik emigres to return to Petrograd. She moved soon afterwards to Kyiv, where she was elected chairman of the party committee for the Southwestern region. She then returned to what was then the Russian Republic, originally aiming at organizing an opposition to Lenin. After the April conference of the RSDLP, Bosch came to change her position, adhering to Lenin's ideas. Her reconciliation with Lenin cost her her marriage. She was elected chairman of a district (okrug) Party Committee and then of a provincial (oblast) Party Committee in the Southwestern Krai.

== Declaration of Soviet Ukraine ==
Bosch was instrumental in launching the First All-Ukrainian Congress of Soviets (December 11–12, 1917, Kharkiv). At this Congress, the Ukrainian People's Republic was proclaimed to be a Soviet Republic, and its membership in a federation with Soviet Russia was also declared. She was elected to the People's Secretariat of the Bolshevik government of Ukraine.

The Congress also denounced the Central Council of Ukraine, also known as the Central Rada, as well as its laws and instructions. The decrees of the Petrograd Council of People's Commissars extended to Ukraine and an official alliance with the Russian Red Army was declared.

Bosch became Minister of the Interior when the Bolsheviks took control of the government in January 1918. As Soviet Ukraine's first Minister of the Interior and Head of the Secret Police, Evgenia Bosch was effectively head of the government, responsible for taking direct charge of the Soviet fight against the bourgeois business owners' and landlords' counter-revolution.

== Opposition to the Treaty of Brest-Litovsk ==
In March, Bosch was outraged when the Soviets signed the Treaty of Brest-Litovsk with Germany, which gave control of territories in western Ukraine to Germany. She resigned her government post in protest and organised worker battalions to resist the advance of the German army through Ukraine. She enlisted, along with Pyatakov and her daughter Maria, in the Red Army forces led by Vladimir Antonov-Ovseyenko. She became ill with tuberculosis and heart disease, however, and after several months of recuperation, she left Ukraine for Russia, where she filled political and military administrative posts for the next few years as the civil war continued.

In August 1918, she was the chairwoman of the Penza Governorate Party Committee during the controversy that led to the issue of the so-called Lenin's Hanging Order. She was then posted to the Caspian-Caucasus front, and later to Astrakhan. In 1919, she was a member of the committee for the defence of Lithuania and Belarus, and then served as a political commissar for the war against General Denikin. Throughout this civil war period, she is reputed to have slept with a revolver under her pillow.

During the period after November 1919 she was under treatment for her tuberculosis and related ailments. She occasionally held secondary positions in the Central Committee of the All-Russian Union of Land and Forest Workers, the People's Commissariat of Education, the Central Union Commission and the People's Commissariat of Food for the provision of aid to the starving, and the People's Commissariat of Workers' and Peasants' Inspection and wrote her memoirs. In 1920–22, she chaired the Military Historical Commission, but from 1922, she was incapacitated by severe illness.

== Trotskyism, death and legacy ==
Bosch joined the Left Opposition in 1923. She was harshly critical of the “bureaucratic group” she saw controlling the Soviet government. She was a supporter of Leon Trotsky and signed The Declaration of 46, the first official statement by the opposition to Joseph Stalin.

Bosch fell out of favour with the Joseph Stalin–Nikolai Bukharin leadership. In 1924, she succumbed to despair after hearing that Trotsky had been forced to resign as leader of the Red Army, as well as in pain from her heart condition and tuberculosis; she died by suicide from a self-inflicted gunshot in January 1925.

Her suicide was met with an immediate, deliberate effort by the Soviet government to suppress official acknowledgement of her status as a major Bolshevik leader.

The more rigorous comrades argued that suicide, however justified it might be by incurable illness, remained an act of indiscipline. Besides, in this particular case suicide was a proof of Oppositional leanings. There was no national funeral, only a local one; no urn in the Kremlin wall, only a place befitting her rank in the plot reserved for communists in the Novo-Devichy cemetery. Forty lines of obituary in Pravda.

Her memoirs, A Year of Struggle, were published posthumously in 1925.

A large suspension bridge over the Dnieper in Kyiv was named in Bosch's honour when it was raised in 1925. Yevgeniya Bosch Bridge, which existed in Kyiv from 1925 to 1941, was named after her. The bridge was constructed by Evgeny Paton on the base of the remnants of Nicholas Chain Bridge blown up by retreating Polish troops in 1920. The bridge was destroyed during World War II. The site of the Bosch bridge is now the location of the Metro Bridge.

A number of other important objects in Ukraine and other places in the Soviet Union were given her name, most of which were renamed after 1991 and particularly since 2015, when communist monuments, communist street names and other toponyms have been outlawed in Ukraine under decommunization laws.

Her daughter Olha married Yuriy Kotsyubynsky and gave birth to Oleh Yuriyovych Kotsyubynsky.

== See also ==
- Rosalia Zemlyachka

== Bibliography ==
- Bosch, Evgenia. The National Government and Soviet Power in Ukraine (1919)
- Bosch, Evgenia. "October days in the Kyiv region" Proletarian revolution No. 11. pp. 52–67 (1923)
- Bosch, Evgenia. "Regional Party Committee of the S.-D (B-Kov) of the South-Western Region" Proletarian revolution No. 5. pp. 128–149 (1924)
- Bosch, Evgenia. "Meetings and conversations with Vladimir Ilyich (1915–1918)" Proletarian revolution No. 3. pp. 155–173 (1924)
- Bosch, Evgenia. A Year of Struggle: The Struggle for the Régime in the Ukraine from April 1917 to the German Occupation (God Borby: Borba Za Vlast Na Ukraine) (Moscow) 1925, republished 1990.
- Barbara Evan Clements (1997). Bolshevik Women. New York: Cambridge University Press. p. 26.

Political offices
Preceded by office installed	People's Secretary of Internal Affairs; December 1917–April 1918	Succeeded by office liquidated
