= 3rd Congress of the Communist Party (Bolsheviks) of Ukraine =

The 3rd Congress of the CP(b)U (Communist Party of Ukraine (Soviet Union)) was held in Kharkiv in March 1–6, 1919 during the Ukrainian-Soviet War ("Entante intervention" and "struggle against [Ukrainian] bourgeoisie-national Directory").

There were 214 party delegates who represented over 23,000 Communists of underground organizations. The congress was attended by the representative of the Central Committee of the RCP(b) Ya. M. Sverdlov, who in his speech focused on the main areas of activity of the CP(b)U, emphasizing the need to focus attention on the restoration and strengthening of the organs of Soviet power in the republic.

Right after the party congress, there was held the All-Ukrainian Congress of Soviets.

== Agenda ==
- About International Communist Congress
- Report of the Central Committee of the Communist Party (Bolsheviks) of Ukraine (CC KP(b)U) (by Emanuel Kviring)
- On the development of the Constitution of the Ukrainian SSR
- Information from the Auditing Commission
- On the attitude to the petty bourgeoisie parties
- About land policy
- About professional movement
- Information from the People's Commissariat of Food
- Report of the CP(b)U delegation at the 1st Congress of the Third Communist International (in Moscow)
- Information about current moment and tasks of the party
- Elections of the CP(b)U governing bodies

== Central Committee ==
The Congress elected the following members to the Central Committee on March 6, 1919:

Elected Members

1. Bubnov Andrei Sergeevich
2. Voroshilov Kliment Yefremovich
3. Gamarnik Jan Borisovich
4. Drobnis Yakov Naumovich
5. Zatonskiy Vladimir Petrovich
6. Ivanov Alexey Nikolayevich
7. Kwiring Emmanuil Ionovich
8. Kosior Stanislav Vikentievich
9. Mescheryakov Vladimir Nikolayevich
10. Pyatakov Yuriy Leonidovich
11. Rakovskiy Khristian Georgiyevich
12. Farbman Rafail Borisovich
13. Rovner Pinkhus Lazarevich
14. Kharechko Taras Ivanovich
15. Khmelnitskiy Alexander Isaakovich

Candidates

1. Averin Vasiliy Kuzmich
2. Zharko Afanasiy Mikhailovich
3. Klimenko Ivan Yevdokimovich
4. Kotsiubinskiy Yuriy Mikhailovich
5. Mayorov Mikhail Moiseevich (Biberman Meer Moiseevich)
6. Tarskiy (Sokolovskiy) Leonid Lvovich

The next day on March 6, 1919, took place a plenum (plenary session) of the Central Committee that elected Yuriy Pyatakov as the Secretary of the Central Committee (see First Secretary of the Communist Party of Ukraine).

=== Former members ===
Members of the Central Committee that were elected in the past. Elected Members

1. Butsenko Afanasiy Ivanovich
2. Kartvelishvili Lavrentiy Iosifovich
3. Kreisberg Isaac Mironovich
4. Lutovinov Yuriy Khrisanfovich
5. Sergeyev Fyodor Andreyevich (Comrade Artyom)
6. Beschetvertnoi Nikolay Ilyich
7. Gruzman Shulim Aizikovich
8. Zaks (Gladnev) Samuil Markovich
9. Zimak Alexander Iosifovich
10. Reut Mikhail Venediktovich
11. Slinko Petr Fedorovich
12. Stalin (Dzhugashvili) Iosif Vissarionovich
13. Schwartz Isaac Izrailevich
14. Yakovlev (Epstein) Yakov Arkadievich

Candidates

1. Lebed Dmitriy Zakharovich
2. Amosov Ivan Karpovich
3. Bliznichenko Andrei Yemelyanovich
4. Vinokurov Naum Mikhailovich
5. Zolotov Fyodor Mikhailovich
6. Klochko Vladimir Yuryevich
7. Lugovoy (Levinstein) Alexander Vasilyevich
8. Morshin I. D. (Rusin Alexey Ivanovich)
9. Skripnik Nikolay Alekseevich
10. Smolyakov Lazar Abramovich
11. Kharchenko Taras Ivanovich
12. Chernysh (Borisov) B. V.

== General overview of the congress ==
In the report of the secretary of the Central Committee of the CP(b)U E.Y. Quiring, the work of the party organizations of Ukraine in underground conditions and after the collapse of the Austro-German occupation and the Directory regime was highlighted. Noting the positive points in the activities of the Central Committee, the congress at the same time pointed out the mistakes made in the leadership of the armed uprising against the occupiers and the work of local party organizations.

The congress outlined the main task of the communists of the republic in the field of party, Soviet, economic and military construction, noting the primary need to establish a united front with all the Soviet republics and, first of all, with the RSFSR.

The resolution on the current moment set forth the tasks of completing the expropriation of capitalists and landlords, transferring all means of production to the state, establishing effective control over production, strengthening work on the creation of regular units of the Red Army in Ukraine, helping the development of the revolutionary movement in western Ukrainian lands, etc.

In the decision on the land issue, the congress outlined specific measures to implement land management, to organize poor peasants and unite middle peasants around them, to launch the fight against kulakism (kurkulism). These provisions formed the basis of the resolution on the food issue. However, when implementing the land policy planned by the congress, local party organizations made mistakes that manifested themselves in the accelerated formation of communes and state farms without taking into account real opportunities.

=== Establishment of politburo and orgburo ===
When it finally became clear that the Central Committee of the RCP(b) would not allow the adoption of the statute of the Communist Party of Ukraine, V. Zatonskyi, one of the most active supporters of the formation of the CP(b)U, during the discussion of the structure of the Central Committee of the CP(b)U at the plenary meeting of the Central Committee on March 6, 1919 made a proposal to create a Political and Organizational Bureau.

It is documented that the plenum of the Central Committee of the CP(b)U was held under the chairmanship of Ch. Rakovsky. Out of 15 elected members of the Central Committee, 14 took part in the plenum - G. Pyatakov, Ch. Rakovsky, K. Voroshilov, A. Bubnov, E. Quiring, V. Zatonskyi, T. Kharechko, P. Rovner, R. Farbman, Ya. Drobnis, A. Ivanov, A. Khmelnytskyi, Ya. Gamarnyk, V. Meshcheryakov, and out of 6 candidates for members of the Central Committee - 1 (Yu. Kotsyubynskyi).

When considering the structure of the Central Committee of the Communist Party of Ukraine, V. Zatonsky, as mentioned above, made a proposal to create a Political and Organizational Bureau within the Central Committee. The Political Bureau (Politburo) of the Central Committee of the CP(b)U was entrusted with solving urgent tasks of a political nature, replacing in some cases the plenum of the Central Committee. The Organization Bureau (Orgburo) carried out current work and directed the party's organizational activities. V. Zatonsky proposed to elect 5 members to the Politburo: Ch. Rakovsky - Chairman of the Council of People's Commissars, G. Pyatakov - Secretary of the Central Committee of the CP(b)U, E. Kviring - Chairman of the Supreme Council of the National Economy of Ukraine, A. Bubnov - Chairman of the Kyiv City and of the Provincial Council of Workers' and Peasants' Deputies, V. Zatonskyi - People's Commissar of Education of the Ukrainian SSR. He proposed to form the Organizational Bureau with 3 members: G. Pyatakov, T. Kharechka, P. Rovner.

During the discussion of the proposed candidates, E. Quiring opposed P. Rovner and proposed to replace him with O. Ivanov, and K. Voroshilov, supporting E. Quiring's proposal, in turn proposed to elect V. Meshcheryakov as a member of the Politburo instead of one of the candidates from the majority. However, the members of the Central Committee supported only the proposal of K. Voroshilov and instead of V. Zatonskyi, the initiator of the creation of the Politburo, they elected V. Meshcheryakov, People's Commissar of Land Affairs of the Ukrainian SSR, as its member.

In this way, the Politburo and the Organizational Bureau of the Central Committee of the CP(b) of Ukraine began to function, although their formation, apparently, was not coordinated with the Central Committee of the RCP(b) and personally with V. Lenin, since no documents or mentions in a fairly large array of the party's historical literature could not be found.

In the Central Committee of the RCP(b) itself, the Politburo and the Organizational Bureau were created later, after the 8th Congress of the RCP(b). Some researchers assume that such a structure of the Central Committee of the CP(b)U could be proposed by the secretary of the Central Committee of the RCP(b) Ya. Sverdlov, who participated in the work of the congress of the CP(b) of Ukraine. Maybe. However, given that Ya. Sverdlov from the very beginning took a sharply negative position regarding the formation of the Communist Party of Ukraine, even with limited independence, it would be unlikely on his part to propose a similar structure for the construction of governing bodies on the model of the Central Committee of the RCP(b).

The most likely thing is that V. Zatonsky could, on his own initiative, perhaps even knowing that the Central Committee of the RCP(b) was considering the question of its new structure, in advance, before the approval of the new statute of the RCP(b), and suggest creating the same bodies in the Central Committee of the CP(b)U. Moreover, in the structure of the Central Committee of the CP(b)U from the 1st to the 3rd congresses there were similar governing bodies - the Foreign and Executive Bureau.

Given the fact that the Communist Party of Ukraine took over the functions of the ruling party during this period, the Central Committee of the CP(b)U faced the problem of creating permanently active leadership bodies within its structure that would work between plenums of the Central Committee and promptly resolve urgent issues of party- of a political nature. That is why V. Zatonsky's proposal to create a Politburo and an Organizational Bureau found support among the majority of members of the Central Committee of the CP(b)U.

It is characteristic that the decision to create such bodies within the structure of the Central Committee of the RCP(b) did not cause any reaction from the Central Committee of the CP(b)U. Perhaps this is explained by the fact that the leadership of the Central Committee of the RCP(b) well understood the weight and importance of the Communist Party of Ukraine, which was the largest party organization within the RCP(b) and it operated in a region that was extremely important for the fate of the RSFSR, the socialist revolution, where significant human resources were concentrated resources, huge food reserves, powerful fuel, metallurgical bases, etc.

The formation of the Communist Party of Ukraine, and later the Politburo, the highest permanent body of the Central Committee of the CP(b)U, as foreseen by V. Lenin and the Central Committee of the RCP(b), caused them great trouble in the issues of centralization of military and national economic administration on the territory of Ukraine. One of the first tests was the resolution of the Politburo of the RCP(b) dated April 8, 1919, sent to the Central Committee of the CP(b)U signed by Y. Stalin, M. Krestinsky and V. Lenin.

== See also ==
- Provisional Workers' and Peasants' Government of Ukraine
- Advance on Moscow (1919)
