= First Rakovsky Government =

First government of the Ukrainian SSR

First Rakovsky Government was a government led by Christian Rakovsky who replaced the former Soviet provisional government in Ukraine that came into crisis.

== History ==
The Bolshevik insurgent Milrevkom was liquidated with establishment of the Provisional Workers-Peasants Government of Ukraine on November 28, 1918. The Council of People's Commissars was created on January 29, 1919 after Yuri Pyatakov was unable to find compromise with members of his government (Provisional Workers-Peasants Government of Ukraine). There was a political struggle between Pyatakov and Fyodor Sergeyev. To solve the issue to Ukraine was sent Christian Rakovsky who was appointed the new head of the Soviet government of Ukraine.

The initial composition of the council was based on the previous temporary government and consisted of 13 commissariats, the Council of National Economy, and the Supreme Socialist Inspection. Among its members were Antonov-Ovsiyenko, Bubnov, Voroshylov, Zharko, Zatonsky, Kotsyubynsky, Kviring, Magidov, Mezhlauk, Podvoisky, Rukhymovich, Sergeyev, Shlikhter, and others. The legal basis of the Council of People's Commissars was approved by the Third All-Ukrainian Congress of Soviets on March 10, 1919. The congress also approved the first Soviet Constitution of Ukraine.

== List of people ==
Office	Name minister	Notes
Foreign Affairs	Christian Rakovsky	Chairman
Military Affairs	Nikolai Podvoisky	Deputy - Mezhlauk
Council of National Economy	Pyatakov; Kviring; Rukhymovich	
Internal Affairs	Voroshilov	
Rev-Mil Council	Antonov	commander
Rev-Mil Council	Kotsyubynsky	
Cheka	Averin	
Soviet Propaganda	Artem	
Labor	Magidov	
Finance	Zemit	
Justice	Khmelnytsky	
Justice	Cherny	Member of Collegium
Agriculture	Kalegayev	(temp. Rakovsky)
Socialist Inspection and State Control	Skrypnyk	
Socialist Inspection and State Control	Galkin	Member of Collegium
Provision	Shlikhter; Bubnov	
Foreign Affairs	Balabanova	
