= Third All-Ukrainian Congress of Soviets =

1919 congress

Third All-Ukrainian Congress of Soviets (Ukrainian: Всеукраїнський з'їзд Рад) was a congress of Soviets (councils) of workers, peasants, Red-army-men deputies that took place in Kharkiv on March 6–10, 1919. The congress followed the Third Congress of the Communist Party of Ukraine that took place on March 1–6, 1919.

It was the first congress after the first reoccupation of Ukraine by Soviets. According to declaration of the Provisional Workers' and Peasants' Government of Ukraine of 28 January 1919, the congress had to be summoned no later than March 1, 1919.

== Background situation ==
On March 10, 1919, the III All-Ukrainian Congress of Soviets, which began on March 6, ended, which legitimized Soviet power in Ukraine, approved the course of communist construction, and approved the Constitution of the USSR as a whole.

The Provisional Workers' and Peasants' Government, formed on November 28, 1918, consisted only of the Bolsheviks themselves and had dubious legitimacy. However, in the Manifesto adopted at the time of its creation (the official Ukrainian name in the Ukrainian SSR is "Universal"), the resolution of the Central Committee of the Soviets of Ukraine dated April 13 was mentioned, which expressed the hope that the German worker would "destroy the executioners of workers' socialist Ukraine with a powerful blow" and that now that time has come, namely the formation of the government and the consideration of the will of the "insurgent workers, peasants and soldiers". However, the Manifesto also stated that "after dealing with the counter-revolution and restoring Soviet power on the ground," the government "will convene the All-Ukrainian Congress of Soviets of Workers', Peasants', and Red Army Deputies and will hand over full power in the state to it."

On January 26, 1919, the newly reorganized government, headed by Khristiyan Rakovsky, approved the Declaration, in which the red thread was the thesis that the powers of the Provisional Workers' and Peasants' Government would end with the convening of the III All-Ukrainian Congress of Councils, which was scheduled for March 1, 1919. Such emphasis reassured the allies of the Bolsheviks in the war with the Directory, in particular, the influential Ukrainian Party of Socialist-Revolutionaries (Bortobists). However, it soon became clear that the Bolsheviks were not going to share power. In connection with this, one of the leaders of the strugglers, Mykhailo Poloz, wrote in a letter dated February 14 to Joseph Stalin, then a member of the Central Committee of the CP(b)U and curator of Ukraine: "Elections at the congresses are held according to the majoritarian system, that is, the artificial creation of a majority in a few votes, a significant minority is deprived of all representation, although this minority stands entirely on the Soviet platform... Due to your party dictatorship, carried out in the almost complete absence of trained party workers in Ukraine familiar with local conditions, the idea of Soviet power is discredited even in the eyes of the workers." .

In the same letter, Poloz, taking into account the USSR government's constant declaration of closeness to Soviet Russia and blind, without taking into account Ukrainian realities, copying of its main legislative acts, noted: "Politics in Ukraine is carried out contrary to everything that was discussed between us. If this continues course, you will be able to hold out (and even then hardly) only by relying on foreign armed forces. It has been decided to create a "communist" congress of Soviets, which, apparently, should vote for merger with Russia. Orders are sent to local authorities that on "only communists should be elected to the Congress. Congresses are held in an atmosphere of military terror."

The Bolsheviks really got an absolute majority of delegates to the All-Ukrainian Congress of Soviets. Due to the actual absence of elections in rural areas, the deprivation of a significant part of the population of electoral rights and the majoritarian principle of delegation of deputies from grassroots councils, members of the CP(b)U and their sympathizers accounted for 1,435 of the total number of 1,787 deputies. The Ukrainian Party of Socialist Revolutionaries (UPSR, after the name of their central printed publication "Borotba" they were also called "Borotbists"), which was already renamed to the UPSR (Communists) during the congress, received 150 mandates, the Ukrainian Party of Left Socialist Revolutionaries ( UPLSR) — 100 mandates, other parties — much less.

Joseph Stalin, who was in charge of matters related to the reorganization of the State Control system in the RSFSR (at the end of March, was headed by the relevant People's Commissariat in the People's Commissariat of Soviet Russia) could not come to the congress. Instead, Yakov Sverdlov, the head of the All-Russian Central Committee, was sent to Ukraine, who, shortly before his appointment, admitted in a letter to Artyom: "Sometimes I feel horror from that wave of independence (in the original language - "independence" - Author) that rolls from both Ukraine and Latvia, and from Estonia, and from Belarus, etc. Do not allow this thing. Watch closely!". Sverdlov was indeed present at the 3rd All-Ukrainian Congress of Councils, but died shortly after returning from Ukraine, according to Volodymyr Zatonsky, due to typhus, which he contracted during the congress in Kharkiv.

Neither Poloz's nor Sverdlov's fears came true. The item on "merger" was not on the agenda of the congress. But during the discussion of the draft Constitution of the People's Commissar of Justice of the Ukrainian SSR, Oleksandr Khmelnytskyi was asked the question: "Clarification, can Ukraine enter the Soviet Russian Republic on a federal basis, and if not, why?" His answer was frank: "If we say that Ukraine is a part of the Russian Soviet Federative Republic, then the question is asked, how did we solve this issue without a master?". That is to say, however, that such a decision has not yet been made in the Kremlin.

At the beginning of the congress, the delegates approved the decision of the RSC of the USSR adopted a few days earlier to return the capital of the USSR to Kyiv. In the course of the work of the congress, the policy of the government, which from now on formally ceased to be "temporary", was discussed and approved, and in the resolution on the "military issue" it was deemed necessary to continue work on the creation of the Red Army in Ukraine. In socio-economic issues, the course for communist construction was confirmed. In particular, when considering the food issue, the idea of replacing trade with direct food exchange and extending the state monopoly on all important food products was approved, for the procurement of which it was proposed to speed up the creation of committees of the poor (kombeds) in the village. The result of consideration of the land issue was the adoption of the law "On Socialist Land Management and Measures for the Transition to Socialist Agriculture", which abolished private ownership of land in any of its forms and all land became part of the state fund, along with the practice of creating agricultural communes. The All-Ukrainian Central Executive Committee was also elected, which included 89 Bolsheviks and 10 fighters. Hryhoriy Petrovsky, who had previously headed the People's Commissariat of Internal Affairs of the RSFSR, was appointed as its head.

The most important decision of the congress was the adoption on March 10 of the Constitution of the Ukrainian Socialist Soviet Republic in its entirety, according to which the USSR was declared "an organization of the dictatorship of the working and demanding masses of the proletariat and the poorer peasantry over their age-old oppressors and exploiters - the capitalists and landlords" (Article 1). Regarding the status, although the fears of the fighters did not come true, however, Article 4 of the Constitution stated that the USSR "declares its firm determination to join the international socialist republic as soon as the conditions for its emergence are created", it was also about the intention to join "the strongest union" with the already existing Soviet republics.

During the discussion of the draft of the Constitution presented by Oleksandr Khmelntsky, a proposal was made by the activist Vasyl Ellan-Blakytny to add that the "authority" establishes the full equality of all nations in Ukraine, rejecting all national privileges, eliminating the possibility of national enmity, and making it the task of the Soviet government to assist the workers of underdeveloped nations, by raising the national culture, to their best development, to the level of their direct and conscious participation in socialist construction." It was, of course, primarily about raising the Ukrainian language and culture. Khmelnytskyi's refusal was completely frank and corresponded to the vision of the situation of the overwhelming majority of the Central Committee CP(b)U: "I think that if we worry about the culture of each nation separately, it will be an unhealthy national burp."

"Ukrainian SSR recognizes work as the duty of all working people of the republic and proposes the slogan: 'He who does not work, does not eat'" — Art. 27 of the Constitution of the Ukrainian SSR

The constitution consisted of three sections. The first 5 articles were the "Basic principles", some provisions of which we have already mentioned. The second section was entitled "Constitution of Soviet Power" and subsections "a) organization of central Soviet power" (All-Ukrainian congresses of councils, VUCVK, RNC of the USSR) and "b) organization of local Soviet power", where, in particular, it was also about who had and who did not have the right to elect and be elected. The third section became the "Declaration of Rights and Duties of the Working and Exploited People of Ukraine" approved in February, one of the clauses of which (Article 28 of the Constitution) read as follows: "USSR recognizes work as the duty of all working people of the republic and proposes the slogan: "Who doesn't work, he doesn't eat."

The text of the Constitution was finally approved at the meeting of the Central Committee of the Central Committee on March 14, 1919. At the same time, an unprovided for in the Constitution, but a real power body was elected - the Presidium of the VUCVK consisting of 5 people (chairman - Hryhoriy Petrovskyi, members: Volodymyr Zatonskyi, Stanislav Kosior, Oleksandr Khmelnytskyi and Klyment Voroshilov), which acted in the period between the sessions of the VUCVK, and the personal composition of the government — the Council of People's Commissars, which was once again headed by Khristiyan Rakovsky.

The 1919 Constitution of the Ukrainian SSR lasted until May 1929, when a new Basic Law was adopted.

== Composition ==
There were 1,787 delegates out which 1,719 had a ruling vote.

== Agenda ==
- Report of the Provisional Workers' and Peasants' Government of Ukraine
- Military issue
- Food supply issue
- Land property issue
- About a draft of the First Constitution of the Ukrainian SSR

== Decisions ==
The congress approved the Provisional Workers-Peasants government of Ukraine and decided to reorganize it into Workers-Peasants government of Ukraine (see Council of People's Commissars). The government included 14 people's commissariats (later on 14 March 1919 it increased to 17).

The congress set a task to establish a regular Red Army, adopted text of a military oath, approved the activity of People's Commissariat of Food Supply, decided to introduce in Ukraine a policy of military communism, adopted "Provisions on socialist land management and about measures of transition to socialist land cultivation".

At the congress was approved the First Constitution of Soviet Ukraine.

According to the new constitution, the congress elected 99 members to the Central Executive Committee and 27 candidates (89 – Communist Party (bolsheviks) of Ukraine, 10 – Communist Party of Ukraine (borotbists)).

== See also ==
- First Rakovsky Government
- 3rd Congress of the Communist Party (Bolsheviks) of Ukraine
- Advance on Moscow (1919)
