= Serafima Gopner =

Bolshevik politician

- Серафима Гопнер
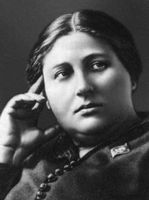
- Serafima Hopner in 1900

Secretary of the Central Committee of the Communist Party of Ukraine
- In office September 9, 1918 – October 23, 1918
- Preceded by: Georgiy Pyatakov
- Succeeded by: Emanuel Kviring

Personal details
- Born: April 7, 1880 Kherson, Russian Empire
- Died: March 25, 1966 (aged 85) Moscow, Russian SFSR, Soviet Union
- Party: RSDLP (Bolsheviks) (1903–1918); Russian Communist Party (1918–1966)
- Education: University of Paris
- Occupation: Politician, historian

Serafima Ilyinichna Gopner (Russian: Серафима Ильинична Гопнер; Ukrainian: Серафима Іллівна Гопнер, romanized: Serafyma Illivna Hopner; 7 April (O.S. 26 March) 1880–25 March 1966) was a Bolshevik politician, a Hero of Socialist Labor (1960), and a Doctor of Historical Sciences (1934).

Hopner was born in Kherson, where her father was a petty trader, and entered the revolutionary movement in 1901. Beginning in 1903, she was a member, and then a secretary of the Bolshevik party. Starting from 1906, she engaged in propaganda work in Katerynoslav and Odesa. In 1910–1917, she lived in emigration. After her return from exile, Hopner worked in Irkutsk, and later in Katerynoslav, Yuzivka and Kharkiv, where she became a party agitator following the October Revolution. From September 9 to October 23, 1918, she was the secretary of the Communist Party (Bolshevik) of Ukraine and a member of its Central Committee; she would return to the latter position in 1927. In 1928-1938 she worked for the Comintern.

In 1938 Hopner left her work in the Comintern and Central Committee of the Communist Party of Ukraine and was appointed deputy chief editor of the Istorichesky Zhurnal magazine. Beginning in 1945, she was an employee of the Institute of Marxism-Leninism. Hopner authored several scientific works dedicated to the history of workers' movement. She died in 1966 in Moscow.

Party political offices
Preceded by Yuri Pyatakov	1st Secretary of the Communist Party of Ukraine; 1918–1918	Succeeded by Emanuil Kviring
