= All-Ukrainian Revolutionary Committee =

Organisation (1919–1920)

All-Ukrainian Revolutionary Committee (Ukrainian: Всеукраїнський Революційний Комітет, romanized: Vseukrainskyi Revoliutsiinyi Komitet) was a temporary supreme body of Soviet power in Ukraine that was created by the Central Executive Committee and the Council of People's Commissars on December 11, 1919, and existed until February 19, 1920. The committee possessed both legislative and executive powers and was based in Homel.

Initially it was composed of five members: Grigoriy Petrovsky (chair), Dmitriy Manuilsky, Volodymyr Zatonsky (all Bolsheviks), Hryhoriy Hrynko (Borotbist), and Volodymyr Kachynsky (Borbyst). Later the number of members was increased to eight with Christian Rakovsky, Vlas Chubar, and Myron Vladimirov. The committee's secretary was Veniamin Yeroshchenko.

The committee issued many important resolutions among which were:

- "about the basic principles of land affairs in Ukraine"
- "announcing Nestor Makhno and his supporters as outlaws"
- "about War Policy in Ukraine"
- "unification and cooperation between Ukrainian SSR and Russian SFSR"
- "application of highest measure of punishment in Ukraine"
- "to workers and peasants of Ukraine"
- "Temporary Provisions on the organization of Soviet power in Ukraine" (December 22, 1919)

On January 27, 1920, the committee extended onto the territory of Ukraine validity of the decrees of the Russian SFSR.
