= Ekaterinoslav Bolshevik uprising =

Battle for Katerynoslav
- Part of Soviet–Ukrainian War
Date	9–11 January 1918
Location	city of Katerynoslav, Ukrainian People's Republic
Result	Soviet victory
Territorial changes	temporary occupation of Katerynoslav by Soviet troops

Belligerents
Ukrainian People's Republic	Russian SFSR

Commanders and leaders
Mykola Porsh; Dmytro Abrynba †	Vasiliy Averin; Pavel Yegorov

Units involved
134th Feodosiia Regiment; Free Cossacks Kurin; Volunteer Haidamaka Kurin	Bryanka factory Red Guards; Orlyk Serdiuk Regiment; 1st Moscow Revolutionary

Strength
1,500	3,000

Casualties and losses
Unknown	21 dead, several dozen wounded

The 1918 Ekaterinoslav uprising (Ukrainian: Катеринославське збройне повстання) was a Bolshevik-led uprising in Ekaterinoslav (modern Dnipro) on 9–11 January 1918 that later was supported by Red Guards of the Soviet expeditionary group under the command of Pavel Yegorov, and grew into an open intervention into Ukrainian internal affairs and the war against the Central Council of Ukraine.

The Bolsheviks lost control of the city when on 5 April 1918 the German Imperial army (during the 1918 German intervention in Ukraine) took control of it.

== Series of events ==
One important aspect of the uprising was the bolshevization of the Ekaterinoslav Soviet of Workers' and Soldiers' Deputies (November 1917), as well as the creation of a military revolutionary headquarters headed by Vasiliy Averin. The Bolsheviks managed to form a company of 3,000 Red Guards, which conducted revolutionary agitation among the city garrison soldiers, and developed and approved uprising plans with the headquarters of the invading Russian Red Forces. By that time Kharkiv was taken over on 25 December 1917 by Russian troops led by Khovrin and Sivers who arrived to Kharkiv at night on 22 December. Soon after the First All-Ukrainian Congress of Soviets in Kharkiv on 25 December, the Russian expeditionary group split with Antonov and continued on to Don, while his chief of staff Muravyov took charge with military operations in Ukraine.

On 1 January 1918 Yegorov's troops took Pavlohrad and on January 5 they occupied Synelnykove and Novomoskovsk, stopping just outside the city limits of Ekaterinoslav. That same day, the Chairman of the General Secretary of the Ukrainian People's Republic Volodymyr Vynnychenko dismissed Symon Petliura from the position of Military Secretary. On 7 January 1918 the city's garrison brought from Oleksandrivsk (Zaporizhia) an armored car. At night local Red Guards stole the car stationed at the Brayanka factory yard and the next day, the city administration requested the vehicle to be returned before 14:00. The request was completely ignored. On 8 January 1918 Ukrainian forces shelled the Bryansk Factory (the center of the uprising) and workers’ settlements. The city's Red Guards and garrison soldiers routed Ukrainian forces in the Kaidaky and Amur-Nyzhnodniprovsky city districts and captured the railway station, the telegraph station, and other government institutions. The insurgents were supported by the Moscow and Petrograd Red Guard forces of Pavel Yegorov, who arrived from Synelnykove.

On 11 January 1918 the city post office, which was the last resort of the anti-Bolsheviks forces, was taken by force. On the same day the Soviet regime was established in the city.

== Aftermath ==
The Bolsheviks were able to keep the city under their control until 4 April 1918. On 5 April 1918 the German Imperial army (during the 1918 German intervention in Ukraine) took control of it.

Ekaterinoslav ultimately came under the control of the Bolsheviks on 30 December 1919.

== See also ==
- Group of forces in fight with counter revolution in the South Russia
