= Chernigov electoral district =

Constituency of the Russian Republic

Chernigov
- Former Civilian constituency for the All-Russian Constituent Assembly
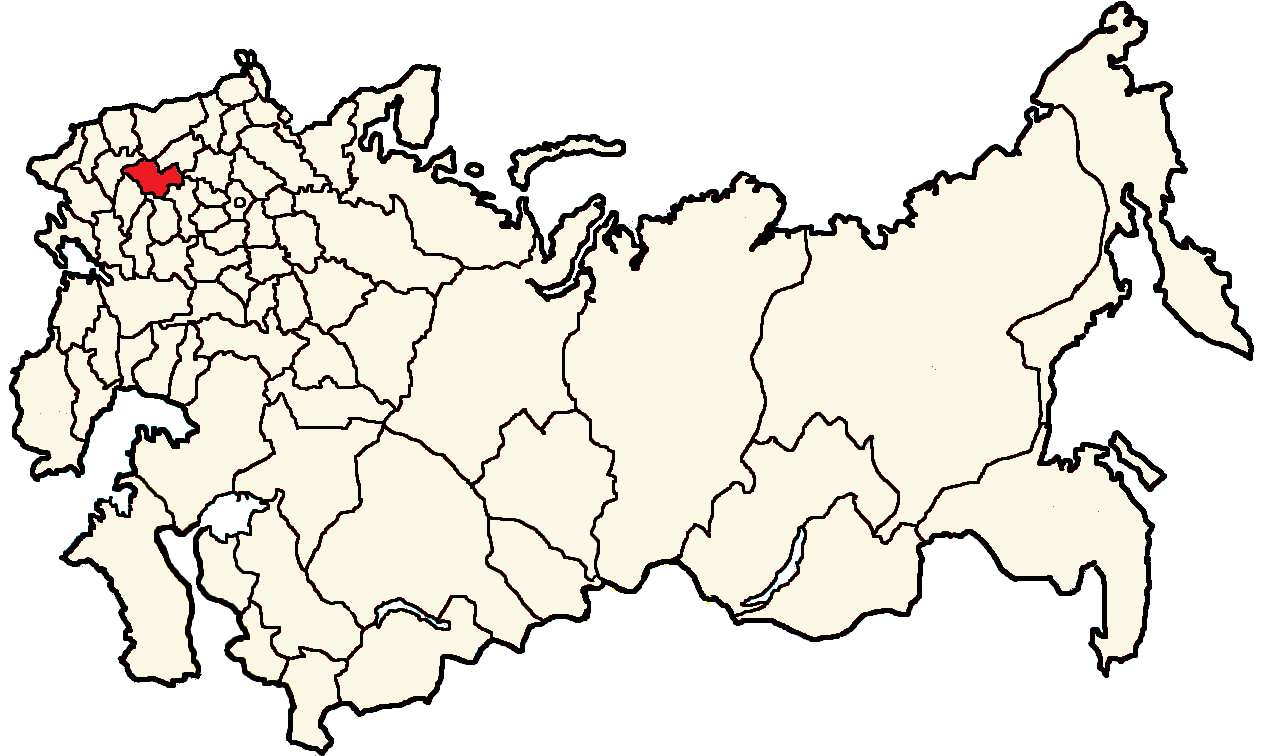

Former constituency
- Created: 1917
- Abolished: 1918
- Number of members: 14
- Number of Uyezd Electoral Commissions: 15
- Number of Urban Electoral Commissions: 2
- Number of Parishes: 181

The Chernigov electoral district (Russian: Черниговский избирательный округ) was a constituency created for the 1917 Russian Constituent Assembly election.

The electoral district covered the Chernigov Governorate. Chernigov was an agrarian province. The Bolshevik Party was absent in most uezds and weak in others. But returning soldiers, about a quarter of the electorate, boosted the Bolshevik vote.

== Results ==
Chernigov
Party	Vote	%	Seats
List 10 - Ukrainian Socialist-Revolutionaries	484,156	49.73	9
List 9 - Bolsheviks	271,174	27.85	4
List 1 - Socialist-Revolutionaries	105,565	10.84	1
List 7 - Kadets	28,864	2.96	
List 4 - Jewish National Committee	28,308	2.91	
List 15 - Non-Partisan Public Figures	12,050	1.24	
List 14 - Landowners	11,857	1.22	
List 2 - Mensheviks	10,813	1.11	
List 3 - Bloc of Ukrainian Socialist-Federalists and Popular Socialists	10,089	1.04	
List 5 - Old Believers	4,858	0.50	
List 11 - Poalei Zion	2,808	0.29	
List 8 - Toiling Peasants	1,020	0.10	
List 13 - Employees of Government Agencies	1,005	0.10	
List 6 - Peasants of Mglin Uezd	538	0.06	
List 12 - Commercial-Industrial	525	0.05	
Total:	973,630		14

Deputies Elected
Breshko-Breshkovskaya	SR
Kostenetsky	Ukrainian SR
Kovalevsky	Ukrainian SR
Kovbasa	Ukrainian SR
Kuzmenko	Ukrainian SR
Lashkevich	Ukrainian SR
Odinets	Ukrainian SR
Sayenko	Ukrainian SR
Shapoval	Ukrainian SR
Shrag	Ukrainian SR
Bosch	Bolshevik
Motorra	Bolshevik
Pyatakov	Bolshevik
Ryndich	Bolshevik
