= Pavel Yegorov =

Russia military leader

Pavel Vasilievich Yegorov (1889 – 1965) was a Russian military leader during the war with Ukraine and the forces of Denikin.

== Life and career ==
He was born in 1889 to a peasant family.

Yegorov graduated from a military college in Lyon, France, in 1915.

In 1917 he joined the Bolsheviks and became a member of Moscow Red Guards. In December 1917 Yegorov led his Red Guards to Ukraine along with the Antonov's expeditionary task force to fight against counter-revolutionary forces. He played a key role in capturing Yekaterinoslav (Modern day Dnipro, Ukraine) during the Yekaterinoslav Bolshevik Uprising and defeat of the Doroshenko Simferopol Regiment.

In the beginning of 1918 his detachment was expanded to become the 1st Revolutionary Army. In March and April of 1918 Yegorov headed troops of the Russian Southern Front and later - the Vladikavkaz Military District. From summer of 1918 to spring of 1919 he was placed in charge of forces in combat area around Vladikavkaz to block off movement of the Denikin's troops.

In summer of 1919, Yegorov led the Poltava task force against the mutinied 6th Ukrainian Soviet Division of Nykyfor Hryhoriv and the Denikin's army. Later he commanded a brigade of the 34th Rifle Division in defense of Tsaritsyn and liberation of Sochi. In the fall of 1920 Yegorov was in charge of the 26th brigade of 9th Rifle Division that fought Wrangel troops in the Taurida Governorate.

In 1921 Yegorov moved to the Far Eastern Republic. In 1941-45 he participated in World War II.

Following the second world war, he lived in Sochi where he died in 1965.
