= Provisional Workers' and Peasants' Government of Ukraine =

Provisional Soviet government

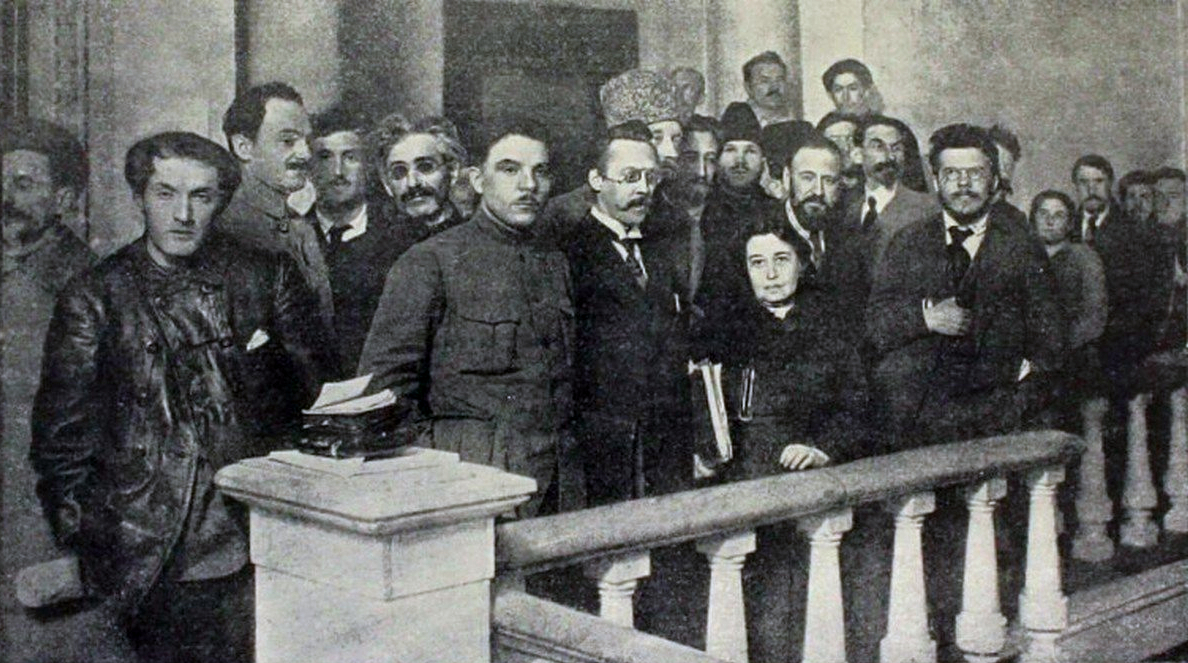
The Provisional Workers-Peasants Government of Ukraine in 1919

The Provisional Workers-Peasants Government of Ukraine (Ukrainian: Тимчасовий робітничо-селянський уряд України, romanized: Tymchasovyi robitnycho-selianskyi uriad Ukrainy; Russian: Временное рабоче-крестьянское правительство Украины) was a provisional Soviet government created on November 28, 1918, in Kursk on decision of the Communist Party of Ukraine and help of the Russian Workers-Peasants Red Army (RKKA), with its place of location was assigned the city of Sudzha, later relocated to Belgorod and Kharkiv. On the same day the government released its manifest. This Soviet government was created in the very same way as the Provisional Workers' and Peasants' Government of Belorussia which on 1 January 1919 also issued its manifest in Minsk. The Provisional Workers-Peasants Government of Ukraine became the highest legislative, executive and administrative body of Soviet power in Ukraine as Soviet Russia resumed hostilities against Ukraine.

== All-Ukrainian Central Military Revolutionary Committee ==
Since July 1918 Bolsheviks were preparing an uprising against the Ukrainian government and the Central powers.

At the Party Congress of the Communist Party of Ukraine that took place on July 5–12, 1918 in Moscow and adapted the party's resolution "About Armed Uprising", it was decided to create the All-Ukrainian Central Military-Revolutionary Committee (Milrevkom). The Milrevkom was located in Kursk and consisted from members of the Insurgency Bureau of the former Bolshevik government of Ukraine. Among its members were Andrei Bubnov (leader), Volodymyr Zatonsky, Vladimir Aussem, Yuri Kotsyubynsky, and Yuri Pyatakov.

Eager to resume open hostilities on August 5, 1918, the Milrevkom issued erroneous Order No.1 about general uprising in Ukraine which was not yet prepared. Next month under direction of the Communist Party of Ukraine formed the 1st and 2nd Ukrainian Soviet divisions.

The strike force of the government became the two Ukrainian insurgent divisions that were created in August 1918 by the All-Ukrainian Central Military-Revolutionary Committee. In Soviet historiography the committee was categorized as a leading organ of fighting for freedom of working masses of Ukraine against the Austria-Germany occupation forces and the bourgeois-land owners regime of the Hetman of Ukraine. The Central Military-Revolutionary Committee was created in July 1918 at the First Congress of the Communist Party of Ukraine that took place in Moscow. The leader of the committee was Andrei Bubnov. The committee was also in charge of underground revolutionary committees and partizan formations. On August 5, 1918, it issued its Order #1 About the nationwide uprising in Ukraine. The committee was dissolved already after four months in November 1918 when the Soviet forces established the Provisional Government of Ukraine.

After annulment of the Treaty of Brest-Litovsk on November 17, 1918, the Sovnarkom of the Soviet Russia gave an order on organization of the Revolutionary Military Council at the Kursk Direction Army Group that included Vladimir Antonov-Ovseyenko, Volodymyr Zatonsky and Joseph Stalin, while the commander of the task force was Vladimir Antonov-Ovseyenko. After the creation of the government, Joseph Stalin was later replaced by Fyodor Sergeyev.

== Provisional Government of Ukraine ==
The main goal of the government was to accomplish the Socialist Revolution with the motto "All power to Soviets". On January 6, 1919, the government declared the Ukrainian Socialist Soviet Republic, abbreviated UkrSSR. On January 16, 1919, the government fired its chairman Yuri Pyatakov and elected Russian Bolshevik revolutionary Fyodor Sergeyev as his successor. On January 28, 1919, the provisional government was replaced by the All-Ukrainian Council of People's Commissars represented by the First Rakovsky Government. The 3rd All-Ukrainian Congress of Soviets (March 6–10, 1919) approved the new government as the Council of People's Commissars by adopting the Constitution of the UkrSSR.

== Composition ==
Government in Sudzha

- Military Department - Fyodor Sergeyev (later - M.Rukhimovich)
- Interior Department - Vasily Averin
- Department of People's Economy and Finance - Emmanuel Kviring
- Foreign Affairs Department - Stepan Vlasenko
- Commissar of Railroads - Panas Zharko
- Administration - Kudrin
  - Foreign propaganda - Žanis Bļumbergs
  - Treasury - Vashchenko
  - Secretary - Granovsky
- Military Council (Kursk) - Sergeyev, Zatonsky, Antonov
- Delegation to the Military Council of Defense - Pyatakov and Sergeyev
- Negotiations with Germany delegation - Zatonsky
