= Council of People's Commissars (Ukraine) =

Highest governing body of the Ukrainian Soviet Socialist Republic, 1919-1946

Council of People's Commissars of the Ukrainian SSR
- Рада Народних Комісарів УРСР

Agency overview
- Formed: January 28, 1919
- Preceding agency: People's Secretariat (1917-18)
- Dissolved: 1946
- Superseding agency: Council of Ministers of Ukraine (1946-90)
- Jurisdiction: Ukrainian SSR
- Headquarters: Sudzha (1918-19) Kharkiv (1919, 1920-34) Homel (1919-20) Kiev (1934-41, 1944-46) Samara (1941-44)

Council of People's Commissars of the Ukrainian SSR (Ukrainian: Рада Народних Комісарів УРСР) or the Radnarkom (Ukrainian: Раднарком) was the highest governing body of executive power in Ukrainian SSR from January 1919 to 1946. Until 1937 it was also a legislative body as well. The council replaced the Temporary Workers-Peasants Government of Ukraine in January 1919. In 1919 during the advance of the Denikin's Army (Armed Forces of South Russia) the role of the council was suspended and for a short period it was merged with the Central Executive Committee of Ukraine and leadership of the Communist Party (Bolsheviks) of Ukraine forming the All-Ukrainian Revolutionary Committee.

== List of governments ==
- People's Secretariat (Skrypnyk, 1917–1918)
  - Insurgent Bureau (underground resistance) / Central Military Revolutionary Committee (1918)
- Provisional Workers-Peasants Government of Ukraine (Pyatakov, 1918–1919)
- First Rakovsky Government (1919)
  - All-Ukrainian Revolutionary Committee (1919–1920)
- Second Rakovsky Government (1920–1923)
- Chubar Government (1923–1934)
- Lyubchenko Government (1934–1937)
- Bondarenko–Marchak Government (1937–1938)
- First Korotchenko Government (1938–1939)
- Korniyets Government (1939–1944, government-in-exile during World War II)
- Khrushchev Government (1944–1946)

== Return of Bolsheviks to Ukraine ==
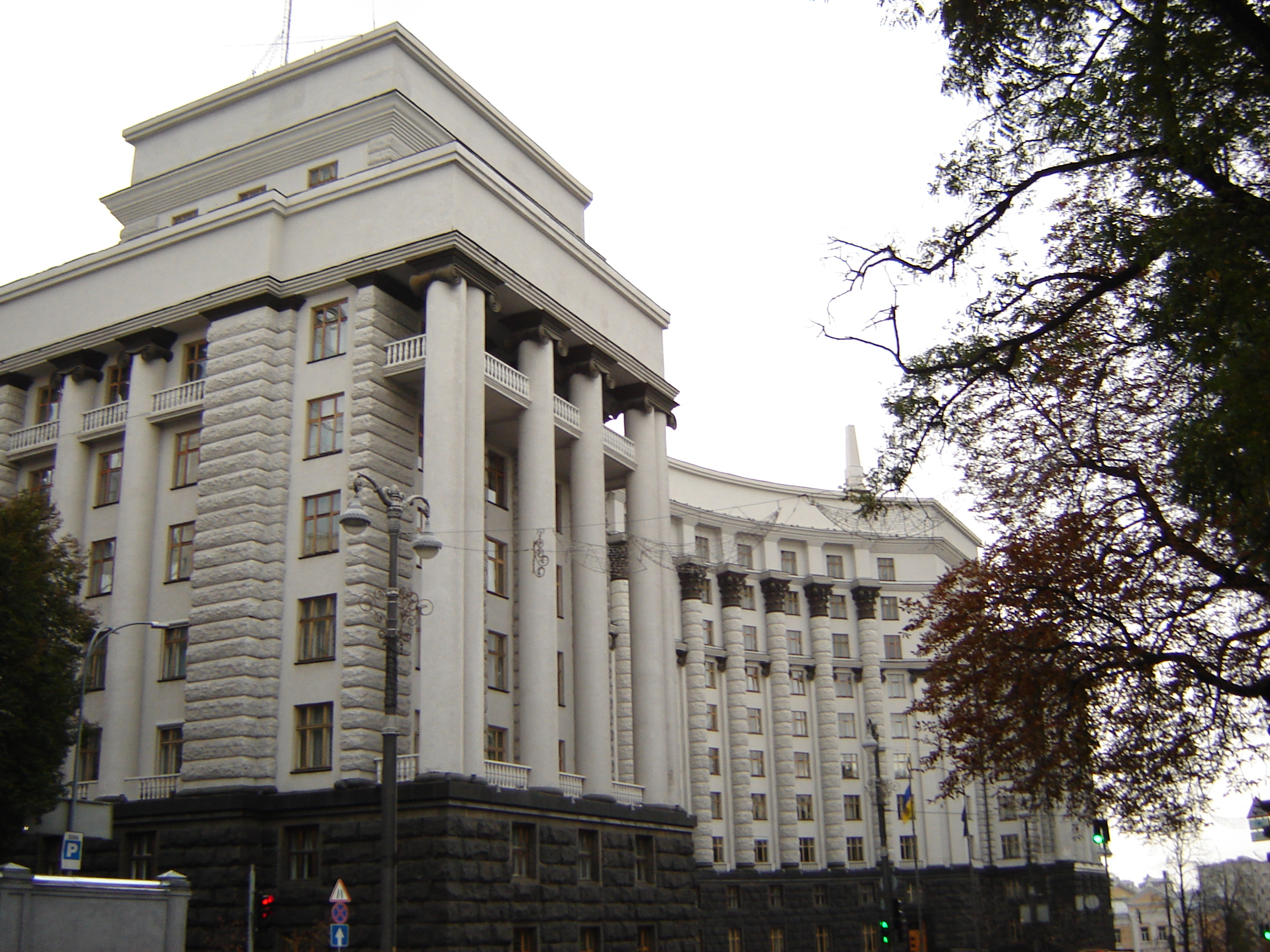
Government Building in Kiev

After liberation of Ukraine from Denikin's Army in February 1920 was introduced the new composition of the council.

Composition (Feb. 1920)

- Rakovsky, Narkom of Internal Affairs
- Manuilsky, Narkom of Land Affairs
- Hrynko, Narkom of Enlightenment
- Vladymirov, Narkom of Provision
- Terletsky, Narkom of Justice
- Paderin, Narkom of Social Security
- Kost, Narkom of Health Care
- Chubar, representative of the Higher Council of National Economy of RSFSR

In December 1920 after signing a friendship treaty with the RSFSR the council also included several united ministries with the RSFSR that were guided from Moscow. On July 13, 1923, Rakovsky was replaced with Vlas Chubar and reassigned on a diplomatic mission. In 1920 there was created the Ukrainian Economical council that in 1923 was included into the Council of People's Commissars.

== See also ==
- People's Secretariat
- Central Executive Committee of Ukraine
