= Vladimir Meshcheryakov =

Soviet politician

- Владимир Мещеряков
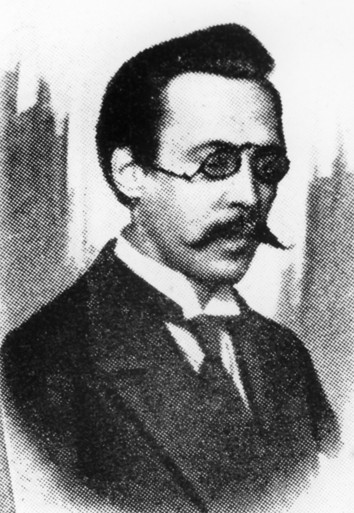

People's Commissar of Land Cultivation of Ukraine
- In office 1919–1919

Personal details
- Born: April 23, 1885 Rasskazovo, Tambov Governorate, Russian Empire
- Died: 15 January 1946 (aged 60) Moscow, Soviet Union
- Party: RSDLP (1905–1918); Russian Communist Party (1918–1946)
- Education: Petersburg Politech

Vladimir Nikolayevich Meshcheryakov (Russian: Владимир Николаевич Мещеряков; 23 April 1885 – 15 January 1946) was a Soviet politician and statesman.

== Biography ==
Born in Rasskazovo (at that time village), in Tambov Governorate of the Russian Empire, he became a socialist activist and politician. At first Meshcheryakov studied at the Tambov realschule and later mechanical department of the Petersburg Politech. In 1908 following his arrest and imprisonment, Meshcheryakov was sentenced to 3 years and 4 months of administrative exile. His exile he served in Verkholensk county (uyezd), Irkutsk Governorate. In 1912 he escaped from exile, and a year later emigrated to France.

After the February Revolution, he returned to Russia and was soon elected a member of the Rozhdestvensky District Council and was appointed responsible organizer of the Rozhdestvensky District Committee of Petrograd. In July, he became chairman of the Union of Loaders of the Vyborgsky District of Petrograd. Then he became the responsible organizer of the Vyborg District Committee of the RSDLP (b).

In 1918, he was secretary and member of the collegium of the People's Commissariat for Agriculture of the RSFSR, and a year later he became People's Commissar for Agriculture of the Ukrainian SSR.

The Meshcheryakov's land policy was so unpopular and anti-peasant that, together with others components, led to armed clashes of the Ukrainian peasants against Soviet authorities. In the summer of 1919, it was recognized as false by the Supreme Council of National Economy of the RSFSR and the Central Committee of the RCP(b). However, the Politburo of the Central Committee of the CP(b)U, having considered this issue on July 25, 1919, emphasized in the reply of the Central Committee of the RCP(b) that Mescheryakov was guided by the instructions of the Central Committee of the CP(b)U in the matter of the state farm building.

From March 1919 to March 1920 he was a member of the Central Committee of the CP(b) of Ukraine. Until August 1919, he was a member of the Politburo of the Central Committee of the CP (b) of Ukraine, head of the peasant section of the political department of the 12th Army, and in November of the same year he became chairman of the Novgorod Provincial Committee of the RCP (b).

From May 1920 to January 1921 - Chairman of the Tambov Provincial Committee of the RCP (b), in 1921 - deputy chairman of the executive committee of the Tambov Provincial Council. From November of the same to June 1922 - Executive Secretary of the Simbirsk Provincial Committee of the RCP (b).

From 1922 to 1928 - a member of the All-Russian Central Executive Committee of the VI convocation, deputy chairman of the Main Directorate of Political Education of the People's Commissariat for Education of the RSFSR, since 1925 - chairman of the Main Political Education. Also in 1922 he became a member of the board of the People's Commissariat of Education of the RSFSR. Since 1925 - a member of the Central Control Commission of the Communist Party of the Soviet Union.

In 1928–1930, he was deputy head of the department for work in the countryside of the Central Committee of the All-Union Communist Party of Bolsheviks.

In 1930 - in the plenipotentiary representation of the USSR in France.

In 1931-1936 he was the 1st secretary of the USSR embassy in Norway.

From 1936 he worked in the apparatus of the Central Committee of the All-Union Communist Party of Bolsheviks.

He died in 1946 in Moscow and was buried at the Novodevichy Cemetery.

Political offices
Preceded by re-established (previously by Vasyl Shakhrai)	People's Commissar of Land Cultivation of Ukraine; 1919	Succeeded by Dmitry Manuilsky
Preceded by Alexey Ionov	Ispolkom chairman of the Novgorod Governorate Soviet; 1919–1920	Succeeded by Nikolay Alekseyev
Party political offices
Preceded by Pyotr Belyayev	Responsible Secretary of the Communist Party of Simbirsk Governorate; 1921–1922	Succeeded by Arkadiy Popov
Preceded by Nikolay Nemtsov	Chairman of the Communist Party of Tambov Governorate; 1920–1921	Succeeded by Nikolay Nemtsov (as responsible secretary)
Preceded by Alexey Ionov	Responsible Secretary of the Communist Party of Novgorod Governorate; 1919–1920	Succeeded by Mikhail Roslyakov
