= Dmitry Manuilsky =

Soviet politician (1883–1959)

Dmitriy Manuilsky
- Дмитро Мануїльський
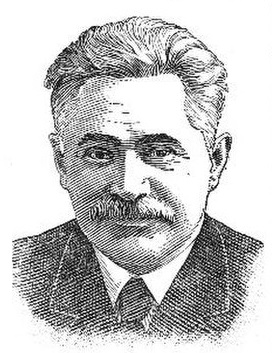

First Secretary of the Communist Party of Ukraine
- In office 15 December 1921 – 10 April 1923
- Preceded by: Feliks Kon (acting)
- Succeeded by: Emanuel Kviring

Permanent Representatative of the Ukrainian SSR to the United Nations
- In office 1945–1952
- Preceded by: Office established
- Succeeded by: Anatoliy Baranovsky

Full member of the 12th, 13th, 14th, 15th, 16th, 17th, 18th Central Committee
- In office 25 April 1923 – 16 October 1952

Candidate member of the 11th Central Committee
- In office 2 April 1922 – 25 April 1923

Personal details
- Born: 3 October 1883 Sviatets, Russian Empire (now Ukraine)
- Died: 22 February 1959 (aged 75) Kiev, Ukrainian SSR, Soviet Union (now Ukraine)
- Resting place: Baikove Cemetery
- Party: RSDLP (Bolsheviks) (1904–1918); Russian Communist Party (1918–1954)
- Education: University of Paris
- Awards: (×3)

Dmitriy Zakharovich Manuilsky or Dmytro Zakharovych Manuilsky (Russian: Дми́трий Заха́рович Мануи́льский; Ukrainian: Дмитро Захарович Мануїльський; 3 October 1883 – 22 February 1959) was an important Bolshevik revolutionary, Soviet politician and academic who was Secretary of the Executive Committee of the Communist International from December 1926 to its dissolution in May 1943.

== Early life and career ==
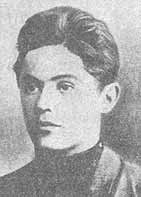
A young Manuilsky

Son of an Orthodox priest, Manuilsky was born to a peasant family in the village of Sviatets, Kremenets County, Volhynian Governorate (now in Teofipol settlement hromada, Khmelnytsky Oblast, Ukraine). After secondary school, he enrolled at the University of St. Petersburg in 1903, and joined the Bolshevik faction of the Russian Social Democratic Labour Party in 1904.

During the 1905 revolution he was assigned by the Bolsheviks to the naval base in Kronstadt where he took part in the naval revolt in July. Arrested, he was held in Kronstadt prison in 1905–06, then exiled, but escaped, arriving in Kiev and then, in 1907, to Paris, where he continued studies at the Sorbonne University. There he supposedly aligned with the ultra-left group led by Alexander Bogdanov, who challenged Lenin for the leadership of the Bolsheviks, and worked on the newspaper Vpered (Forward).

After the outbreak of war in 1914, he worked on the newspaper Nashe Slovo and acted as the main contact between the Bolsheviks and the smaller group associated with Leon Trotsky. Manuilsky's articles also appeared in the Ukrainian social democratic press. After his return to Russia in May 1917, he supposedly joined Trotsky's group, the Mezhraiontsy, who amalgamated with the Bolsheviks in August 1917.

== After the October Revolution ==
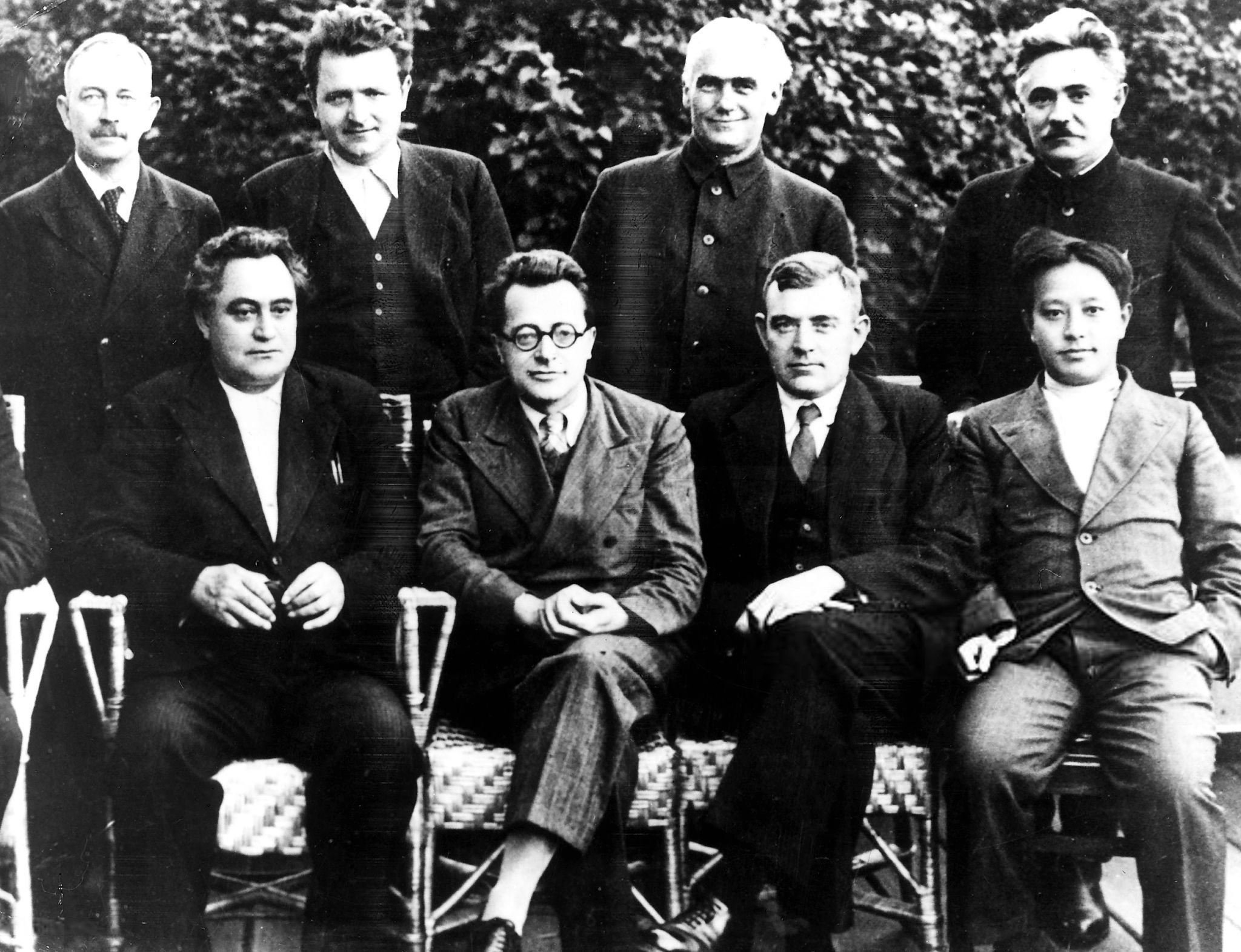
Members of the Executive Committee of the Comintern at the 7th World Congress, 1935. Seated (L-R): Georgi Dimitrov, Palmiro Togliatti, Wilhelm Florin, Wang Ming. Standing: Otto Kuusinen, Dmitry Manuilsky, Klement Gottwald, Wilhelm Pieck.

During the Russian Civil War, Manuilsky worked in the People's Commissariat for Food, before being sent to Ukraine, where Lenin assigned him the task of organising the peasant population around Kharkov to defeat the White Army of Anton Denikin. He also took part in the Soviet Russian delegation at the peace negotiations with Ukraine.

Starting from 1919, Manuilsky became an active member of the Communist Party of Ukraine, and participated in a Moscow-critical conference of the organization in Gomel. However, soon thereafter he abandoned his oppositional views and denounced the "federalist" group of the party before Lenin. In January 1919, Manuilsky and Inessa Armand were sent to Paris, in the hope they could stoke a revolution in France, but he was arrested and deported.

In 1919-1920 Manuilsky was a member of the All-Ukrainian Revolutionary Committee. Between 1920 and 1921, during the famine in Ukraine, he served as the People's Commissar for Food of the Ukrainian Soviet Socialist Republic. He then switched to journalism, editing the newspaper Kommunist and serving as secretary of the Ukrainian Communist Party. From 1922 Manuilsky was working for the Comintern, serving as the organization's secretary in 1928–1943. On that position he was responsible for executing purges in the Comintern's apparatus and in foreign Communist parties on the orders of Stalin.

From 1923 to 1952 he was a member of the Central Committee of the Communist Party of the Soviet Union, as well as a member of the elite inner circle known as the "malaia comisiia", a five-member group that ruled the eleven-member Political Secretariat. In 1926, he supplanted Nikolai Bukharin as leader of the Soviet Union delegation on Comintern's executive, and the lead representative at congresses of the French, German, and Czechoslovak communist parties.

== Later life and career ==
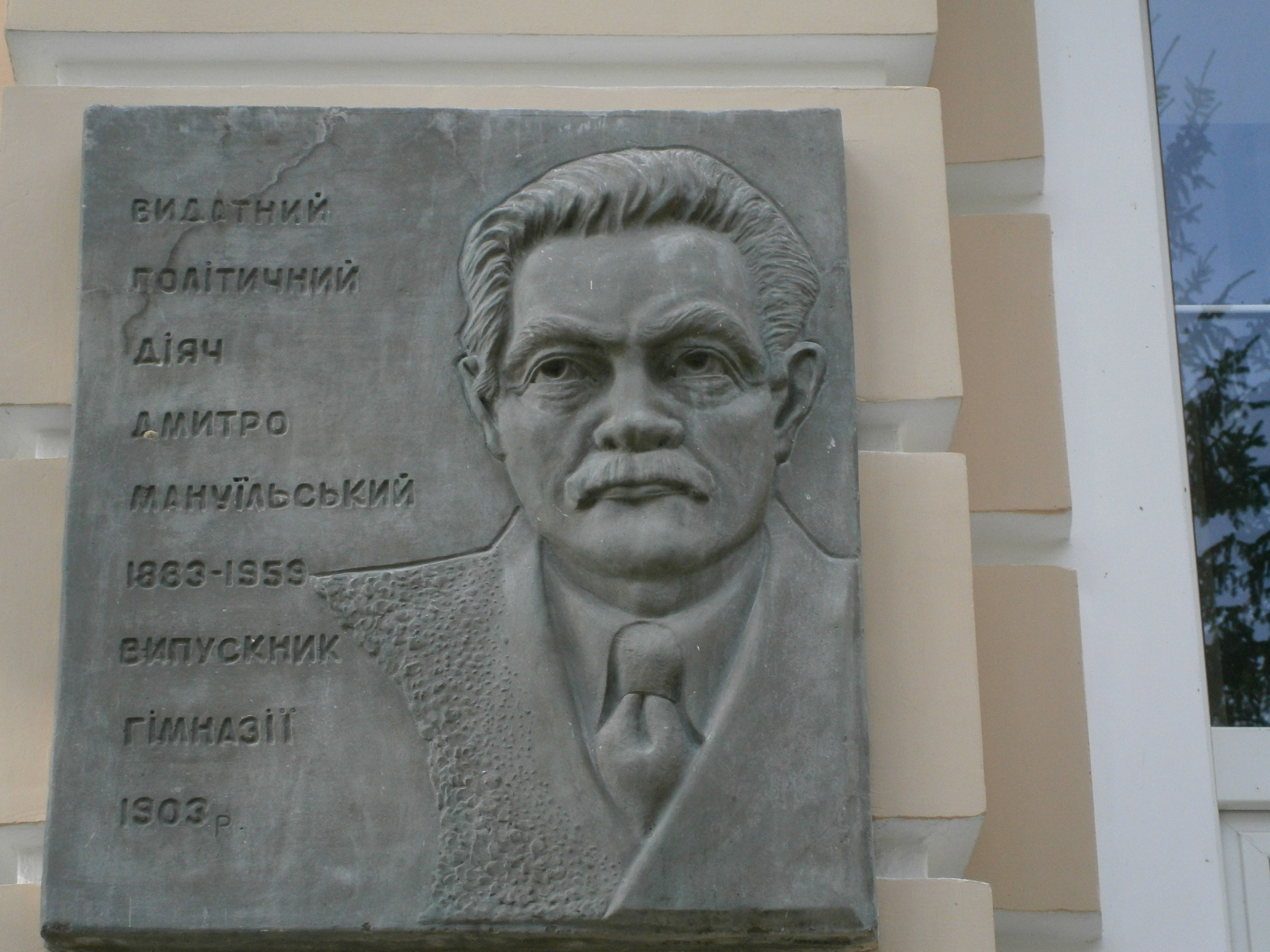
Memorial plaque for Dmitry Manuilsky in Ostroh

From 1935 until the dissolution of Comintern in 1943, Manuilsky acted as deputy to its General Secretary, Georgi Dimitrov. During the Great Purge, almost every Old Bolshevik with a past link with Trotsky was killed or imprisoned, except Manuilsky, whom Stalin despised but by whom he did not feel in any way threatened. In 1939, he told Dimitrov: "Manuilsky is a toady! He was a Trotskyite! We criticised him for keeping quiet and not speaking out when the purges of Trotskyite bandits were going on, and now he has started toadying!"

The Montenegrin communist Milovan Djilas, who met Manuilsky in 1944, admired his learning and writing talent, but remembered him as "a slight and already hunched veteran, dark-haired, with a clipped moustache [who] spoke with a lisp, almost gently and – what astonished me at the time – without much energy." Seeing him again five years later, Djilas thought him an "almost senile, little old man who was rapidly disappearing as he slid down the steep ladder of the Soviet hierarchy."

Between 1944 and 1952, Manuilsky held a post of Foreign Minister of Ukraine. Having fallen out of Stalin's favour after 1950, from 1952 to 1953 he served the Ukrainian ambassador to the United Nations. On the latter position he was known for his speeches denouncing Ukrainian emigration. After Stalin's death Manuilsky left politics. He died in 1959 in Kiev.

== See also ==
- List of delegates of the 2nd Comintern congress
- First Secretary of the Communist Party of Ukraine
- Permanent Representative of Ukraine to the United Nations

Political offices
Preceded by Arne Sunde; Faris al-Khoury	President of the United Nations Security Council; July 1949; July 1948	Succeeded by Semyon Tsarapkin; Yakov Malik
Preceded by Oleksandr Korniychuk	Minister of Foreign Affairs of the Ukrainian SSR; 1944–1952	Succeeded by Anatoliy Baranovsky
Preceded by ?	People's Commissar of Land Cultivation (Ukraine); 1920–1921	Succeeded by ?
Preceded by ?	All-Ukrainian Revolutionary Committee; 1919–1920	Succeeded by ?
Party political offices
Preceded by Feliks Kon (acting)	1st Secretary of the Communist Party of Ukraine; 1921–1923	Succeeded by Emanuil Kviring
