= Emanuel Kviring =

Soviet politician (1888–1937)

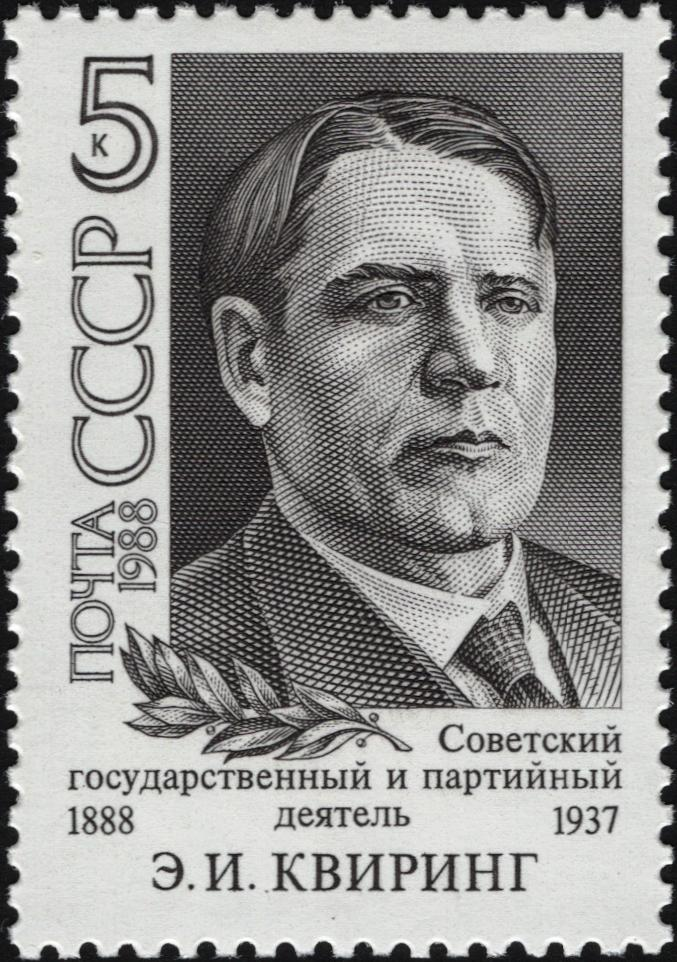
- 1988 Soviet stamp featuring Kviring

First Secretary of the Communist Party (Bolsheviks) of Ukraine
- In office 10 April 1923 – 7 April 1925
- Head of state: Volodymyr Zatonsky (March-April 1918) (Note: After Zatonsky, the office was temporarily abolished until Grigory Petrovsky took on the post on 10 March 1919, after Kviring had been dismissed initially.); Grigory Petrovsky
- Head of government: Georgy Pyatakov; Christian Rakovsky; Vlas Chubar
- Preceded by: Dmitriy Manuilsky
- Succeeded by: Lazar Kaganovich
- In office 23 October 1918 – 6 March 1919
- Preceded by: Serafima Hopner
- Succeeded by: Stanislav Kosior

Personal details
- Born: 13 September [O.S. 1 September] 1888 Friesenthal, Samara Governorate, Russian Empire
- Died: November 26, 1937 (aged 49) Moscow, Soviet Union
- Party: Socialist-Revolutionary Party (1906–1912); RSDLP (Bolsheviks) (1912–1918); Russian Communist Party (1918–1937)
- Children: 1
- Education: Petersburg Politech
- Awards: Order of the Badge of Honour (1936)

Emanuel or Emmanuel Ionovich Kviring (Russian: Эммануил Ионович Квиринг; Ukrainian: Емануіл Йонович Квірінг; 13 September 1888 – 26 November 1937) was a Soviet politician and statesman of Volga-German descent who served as First Secretary of the Communist Party of Ukraine (CP(b)U) from 1918 to 1919 and again from 1923 to 1925.

Born in the smaller village of Friesenthal in the Samara Governorate to a poor German colonist, Kviring was employed as an apprentice at a pharmacy in Saratov and joined the Socialist Revolution Party early on in 1906. After moving to the city of St. Petersburg, he became an Old Bolshevik in 1912, and began writing for the newspaper Pravda while also being employed as the Secretary of the Bolshevik faction to the Fourth State Duma of the Russian Empire. He was eventually arrested during a raid on Pravda in 1914 and sent into exile, which led him to move to the Ukrainian city of Yekaterinoslav (now Dnipro) and later to the Irkutsk Governorate. Before and during the Russian Civil War, Kviring played an important part in the government of the city of Yekaterinoslav as a leading Bolshevik and was considered part of the right Communists that opposed the Left Communist faction led by Georgy Pyatakov. He was also active in opposing the creation of a separate Ukrainian republic, although he later supported the creation of an autonomous CP(b)U in line with the party.

During the second congress of the CP(b)U in October 1918, Kviring was elected First Secretary of the Central Committee of the CP(b)U, replacing Pyatakov. His term as First Secretary was mostly marked by the annulling of the Treaty of Brest-Litovsk, which led to active hostilities in Ukraine again. In the following congress, in March 1919, he was eventually dismissed for "weak leadership". Over the next few days, Kviring frequently moved around Ukraine, taking on a variety of roles, including being Secretary of the Communist Party in both the Donetsk Governorate and Yekaterinoslav Governorate. He was also one of the negotiators during the Treaty of Riga. In 1923, he was re-elected to the post of First Secretary of the Central Committee of the CP(b)U. Two years later, in 1925, he was dismissed from the post due to his fierce resistance to the initially promoted policy of Ukrainization, for which he was accused of Russian chauvinism, and so he was recalled to the Russian SSR. Over the next decade, he was mainly employed in party work for the USSR, specifically within the area of economics. Kviring was eventually arrested by the NKVD during the Great Purge, and was sentenced to death during Joseph Stalin's show trials. He was rehabilitated posthumously in 1956 during the Khrushchev Thaw.

== Early life and education ==
Emamnuel Ionovich Kviring was born on 13 September 1888 in Friesenthal, a Volga German village in what is now the Sovetsky District of Saratov Oblast. At the time, Friesenthal was part of the Samara Governorate of the Russian Empire. His father, Ion Kviring, was a poor ethnic German colonist who had given up agriculture due to his health and became a volost clerk. When Emmanuel turned seven, his father, Ion, sent him to the village of Lauwe, in order to board at a four-year zemstvo school. After finishing his primary education there, Emmanual went to the city of Saratov at the age of eleven to enter a private progymnasium. Emmanuel's education was ultimately cut short when he was in the fifth grade of the progymnasium, because his father could not fund both of his sons to go to school, as Emmanuel's younger brother, Erich, was also brought to Saratov in 1904.

=== 1905-1912: Revolution of 1905 and aftermath ===
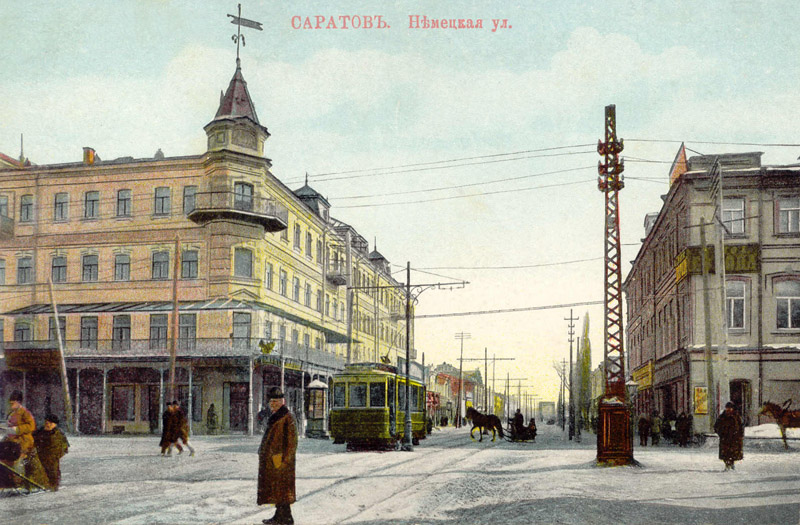
A postcard from Saratov in 1917. During his early life, Kviring spent time in the city, where he was an apprentice pharamcist and a member of the Socialist Revolutionary Party.

After the end of his education, Kviring returned to his native village of Friesenthal initially, but by the time of the 1905 Russian revolution, he had moved to the village of Stepnoye (or Louis/Otrogowka, as the village was called by the Germans). As Kviring later recalled, the revolution only passed by the village, with the locals only hearing rumours from other cities about what was happening. However, he soon became acquainted with socialist personalities like Ferdinand Lassalle. Kviring read Lassalle's speeches after a zemstvo doctor, who was an admirer of Lassalle, introduced him to Kviring. Eventually, though, Kviring decided to leave the village in 1906 to return to the city of Saratov. Upon returning to Saratov, he became employed as an apprentice at a pharmacy and joined the local Saratov branch of the Socialist Revolutionary Party. Kvirin worked as part of the SR underground and attended the mass demonstrations of workers in 1907 in response to the Coup of June 1907. Due to this, he was blacklisted of the secret police (Okhrana) for taking part in the disorder in Saratov in 1907. Despite this, he was still involved in underground circles and initially began associating with the circle Lighthouse in Saratov, where he debated social problems, before it was banned and he moved on to forming an illegal self-education circle. After marrying Dunya Gurina, despite his parents' wishes, because she had been previously married, he moved to the city of Pokrovsk (now Engels), closer to where the pharmacy was. He did not stay long in Engels, though, as he moved to Astrakhan in 1911 with his wife for an independent job.

=== 1912-1913: St. Petersburg and Pravda ===
A year later, in the summer of 1912, he moved to St. Petersburg due to a letter from his brother, Erich, and began attending lectures in the commercial and economic department of the polytechnic courses of the St. Petersburg Society of Professors. He also began to contribute to the newspaper Pravda. He later attributed his writing for Pravda to what turned his Marxism beliefs into Bolshevism beliefs as part of the generation of "Pravda-ites". In 1913, he took an active part in the demonstrations in St. Petersburg for the International Workers' Day, during which he narrowly escaped arrest, while his brother Erich was arrested and expelled from the city. Later that year, he was also elected chairman of the assembly of the society of Nauka i Zhizn for the city of St. Petersburg and was also sent to be secretary of the health insurance fund of the F. Studer Sawmill.

== Early political career ==
=== 1913-1914: IV State Duma and arrest ===
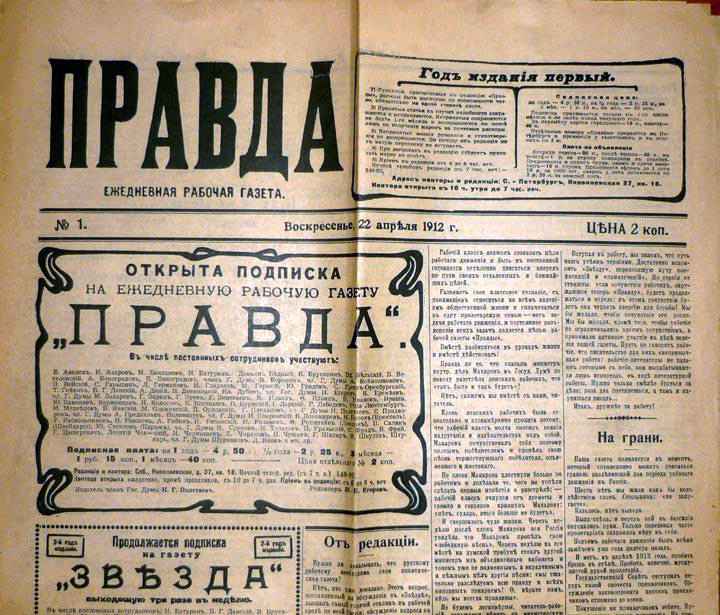
An issue of Pravda from 1912. In July 1914, Kviring was arrested during raids on the offices of Pravda and was taken to Kresty Prison. Later, in August, he was expelled from Petrograd (St. Petersburg) in connection with the case.

In 1913, Kviring was recommended by the Bolshevik committee of St. Petersburg to be Secretary of the Bolshevik faction of the Fourth State Duma of the Russian Empire and the personal secretary to one of the Bolshevik deputies, Alexei Badayev. As Secretary of the Bolshevik faction, he selected and processed materials for speeches and drafted inquiries and amendments for deputies unfamiliar with legal matters. Upon taking on the role, he was immediately put under surveillance by the Okrana, and was given the code name Mokhovoy (in reference to the street he lived at). Soon after, in March 1914, he participated in a protest in St Petersburg in commemoration of the Lena massacre. On the orders of the St. Petersburg department of the Okhrana, 21 members of the RSDLP were arrested that night, including Kviring, but he was released a few days later after the secret police could not find direct evidence in their search of his apartment.

Later, when the Pravda offices were raided on 8 July 1914, and all the staff were arrested, Kviring and Badayev arrived and hid all of the party documents at Badayev's apartment to prevent them from being seized. Amid the crackdowns, on 9 July, he worked with Badayev to draft a new emergency edition of Pravda and helped log all the materials, although the emergency issue was never printed. He was then arrested the following morning after an interrogation by Okhrana and taken to Kresty Prison. During the following months, the Okhrana further investigated those who were arrested during the raid on Pravda, and in their files accused Kviring of being "one of the most active representatives of the local RSDLP Bolshevik organisation, acting as an intermediary for leading worker circles in the party underground...repeatedly participating in unauthorised party gathering and meetings, [and] distributing illegal and tendentious party literature." The case ended on 27 August 1914, when a special board of the Ministry of Internal Affairs of Russia ruled that six members of the Pravda circle would be sent to Yeniseysk Governorate, while the others (including Kviring) were required to immediately leave the now-renamed Petrograd.

=== 1914-1916: Exile in Ukraine ===
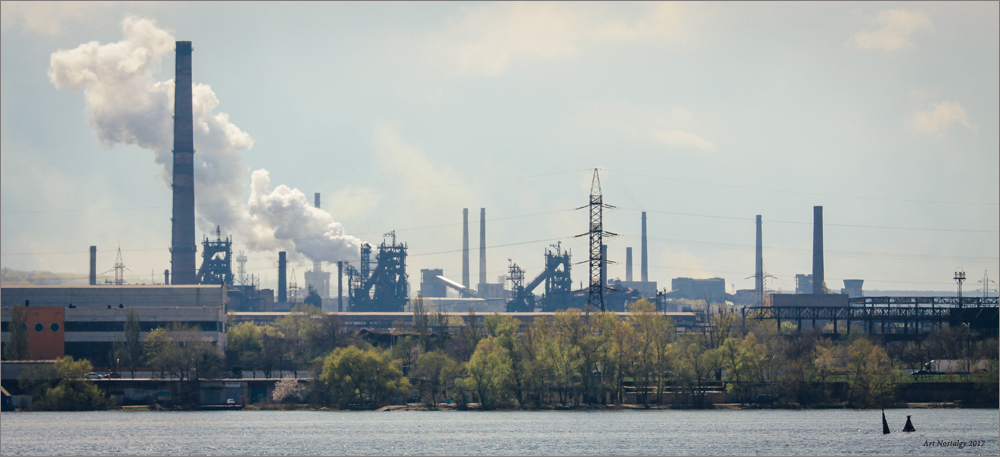
The Dniprovsky Metallurgical Plant pictured in 2017. During his time in eixle in Ukraine, he was the secretary of the sick fund there at the then named Bryansk plant.

After his release, Kviring briefly went to Saratov to check on his wife and son, while he agreed that Vasily Schmidt would go to the city of Yekaterinoslav (now Dnipro) in Ukraine and write about work there. Kviring eventually made his way to Kamenskoye (now Kamianske) in November 1914, and worked there for some time at a sick fund of the Dnieper Metallurgical Combine. Kviring eventually joined Schmidt sometime later at the Bryansk plant, where he was appointed secretary of the sick fund there because of his work at the Studer plant in St. Petersburg. As in St. Petersburg, Kviring was kept under the surveillance of the Okhrana under Mokhovoy. While at Bryansk, he attempted to reach the Bolshevik organisation, although the area had no contact with any committee and no leadership because of earlier arrests. In early 1915, a newly formed Bolshevik committee in Yekaterinoslav was created, which he joined as a member from the Bryansk area, in addition to another union where he was one of two Bolshevik seats alongside a man named Entin. His activities in support of the Bolsheviks continued to grow throughout 1915, and eventually, in the spring, it was decided to plan an illegal newspaper, Yuzhnaya Pravda, for which he wrote the leading article against World War I, but it was never printed. After this, the secret police started to increase their surveillance on him, and in the summer they eventually arrested him either at Kviring's home or in Bryansk. While detained, he, along with ten others who were arrested, held a hunger strike, until the police eventually named Kviring as the intended publisher of Yuzhnaya Pravda. After this, the Odesa Military District sent him into exile to the Irkutsk Governorate, with the sentence being for the duration of martial law (due to World War I).

=== 1916-1917: Irkutsk ===
Kviring was eventually transported to the Balagansk uyezd, specifically to the village of Malyshevka. Not even a few days after arriving, Kviring was arrested again on suspicion of correspondence with Bolsheviks in Turukhansk, but he was later released, with his wife and son coming ot join him in Malyshevka soon after. While Kviring read and tutored children to make money, he also helped the underground by sheltering prisoners who passed through the main Balagansk Prison. In the summer of 1916, he was jailed again for helping three exiles escape from Balagansk, but was released before the start of the February Revolution.

== Revolution and Civil War ==
=== 1917: Revolution ===
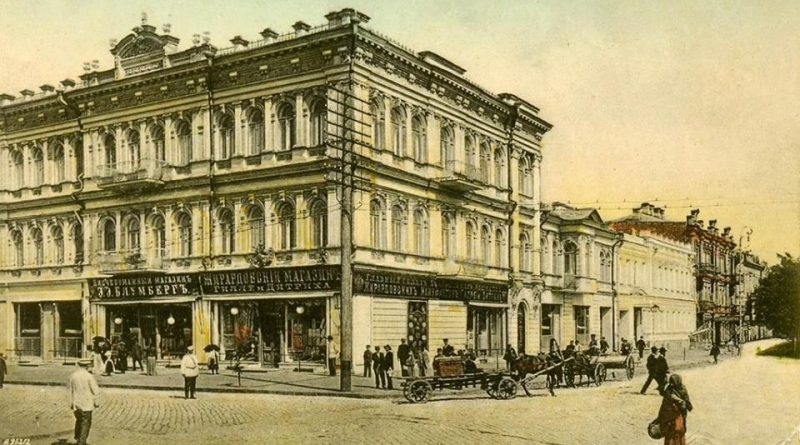
View of Yekaterinoslav (Dnipro) in January 1917, just before the outbreak of the war. In February, a month later, Kviring returned to Yekaterinoslav from Malyshevka after the February Revolution.

After the news of the February Revolution, Kviring initially returned to Petrograd (St. Petersburg), but upon the urging of Schmidt, he went back to Yekaterinoslav in Ukraine, arriving back on 4 April 1917 together with Yury Lutovinov. Immediately after his return, he was re-elected as secretary of the Bryansk plant committee, and during the 1917 Russian municipal elections he was elected to the Yekaterinoslav City Duma representing Bryansk and also became a member of the Yekaterinoslav Committee of the RSDLP (Bolsheviks). In the Duma, he was the Head of the Department of Housing, which was specifically created by the Bolsheviks. In the subsequent months, during the July Days, Kviring led the Bolshevik committee of the Duma, and demanded a vote of no confidence on the Menshevik-SR faction in the city, but nothing came of this. In mid-July, he was also elected as a member of the regional committee of the RSDLP (Bolsheviks) of the Donetsk-Kryvyi Rih basin. He finally became chairman of the Bolshevik party committee for Yekaterinoslav in September.

Soon after the October Revolution occurred, when the Bolsheviks took power, Kviring immediately reported this to an emergency committee of leftists in Yekaterinoslav. Kviring immediately said that the Bolsheviks would take power, and he demanded that new elections be held alongside the arming of all workers. After a plenum of the city in late October, the Soviets were allowed to take power, but an amendment by the plenum also recognised the revolutionary committee of the Ukrainian People's Republic and the authority of the Central Rada. Kviring later called recognising the Central Rada a mistake, and upon heading the provincial revolutionary committee, he condemned the organisation. Gradually, tensions worsened between the Bolsheviks (led by Kviring) and the Rada in Yekaterinoslav, with both sides preparing for an armed uprising, with the Bolshevik weapons to be stored at Bryansk. Finally, on 26 December, the Haydamak seized most of the key points of the city and demanded that the Bolsheviks surrender, which they refused. Fighting continued around the city for multiple days after this, until the Bolsheviks finally took the post office and were reinforced by the Red Guard and an armoured train commanded by Alexander Yegorov.

=== 1918: Civil War ===
Throughout January 1918, Kviring worked on promoting Bolshevik influence in the city and agitating the surrounding villages. However, the Ukrainians quickly advanced on Yekaterinoslav after the signing of the Treaty of Brest-Litovsk (Ukraine–Central Powers). In order to stop this, Kviring tried to appeal to form more Red Army detachments, and eventually, on 12 February, the Soviets declared the formation of the Donetsk–Krivoy Rog Soviet Republic, into which his city was annexed. This did nothing to deter the Ukrainians, though, and on 3 March the Treaty of Brest-Litovsk was signed, in which the Soviets agreed to renounce their claims on Ukraine. Following this, Kviring was sent as a delegate on behalf of Yekaterinoslav to the Second All-Ukrainian Congress of Soviets, which was actually held in the city in mid-March. During this congress, he was elected to the Bolshevik presidium and was considered part of the communist faction, together with Mykola Skrypnyk, that opposed the Left Communist, the faction that opposed peace on terms of the Treaty of Brest-Litovsk, which was led by Georgy Pyatakov. After the Congress, the Germans and Ukrainians eventually approached Yekaterinoslav in late March, with Kviring leading the defence until the city eventually fell and he was forced to flee to the temporary capital of Taganrog, where another congress was held in July 1918. During this congress, he vehemently opposed the creation of a separate Ukrainian republic, arguing that Soviet Russia and Ukraine should be united together, as part of the group of right-wing "Donbasians". He argued that separating the two republics would contradict economic interests. However, his eventual co-report for the congress agreed to the creation of an autonomous Communist Party of Ukraine (Soviet Union) (CP(b)U), which would have its own congresses and Central Committee, with the caveat that it would remain under and report to the Communist Party of the Soviet Union.

== 1918-1925: Rise to power ==
=== 1918-1919: First Secretary of the Central Committee in Ukraine ===
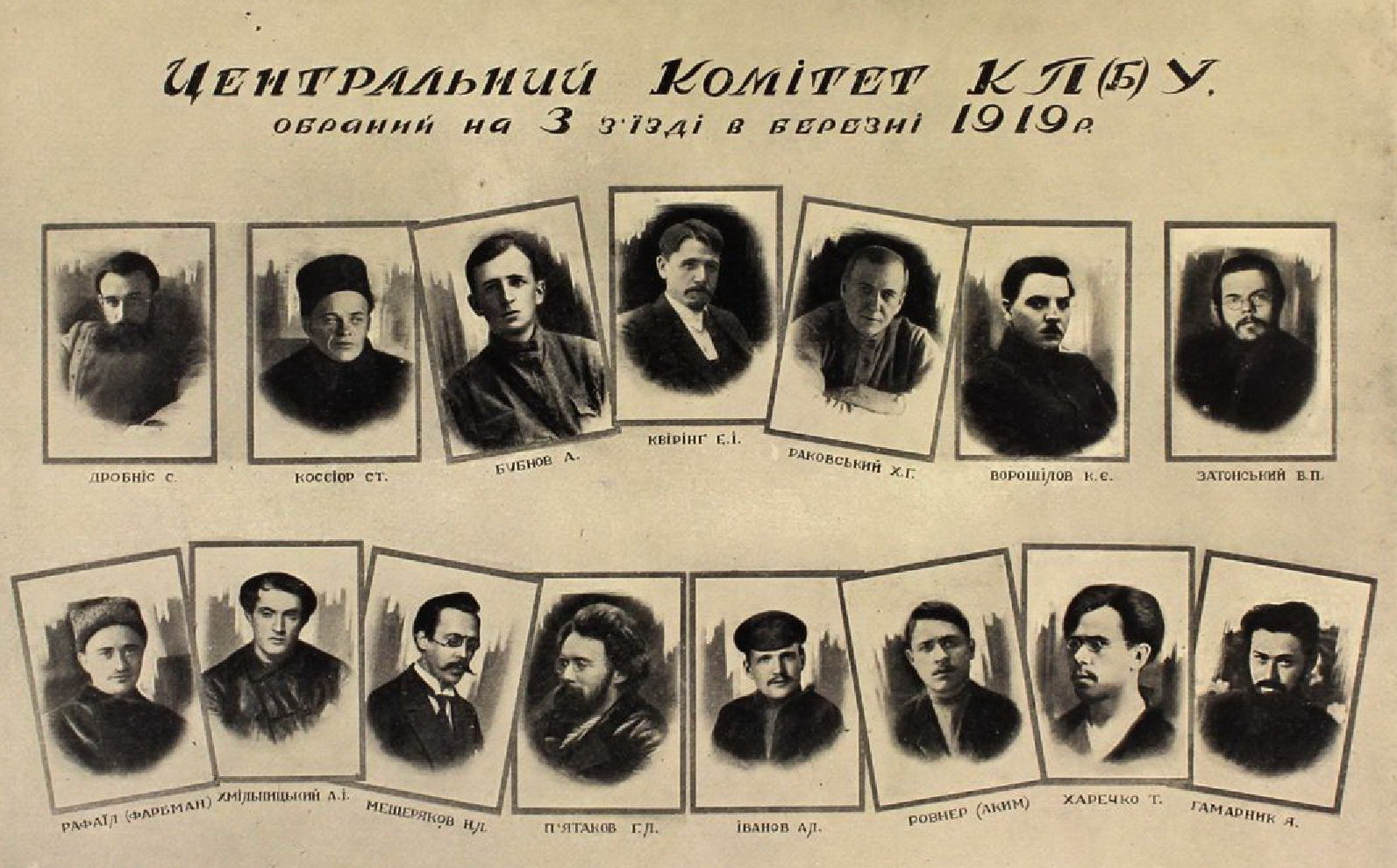
Members of the CP(b)U during its 3rd Congress (1919). Kviring is at the top, in the middle. He was replaced as First Secretary during this congress.

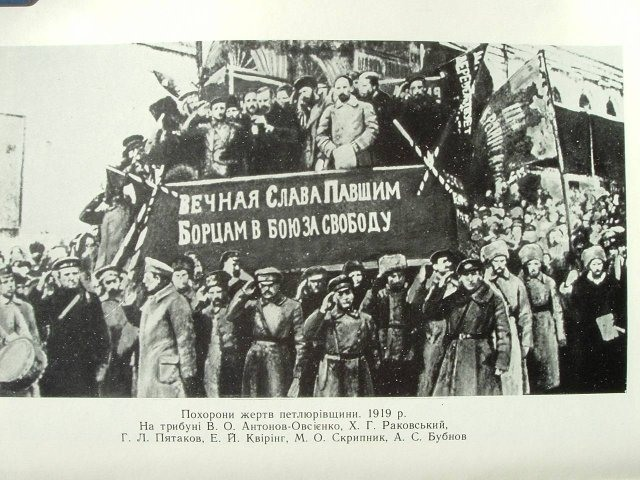
Funeral of victims of Petliura's rule, 1919. In the stands (from right to left): Antonov-Ovseyenko, Rakovsky, Pyatakov, Kviring, N. A. Skripnik, Bubnov.

At the end of the 2nd Congress of the Communist Party (Bolsheviks) of Ukraine, which was held in Moscow, Kviring was elected First Secretary of the Central Committee of the CP(b)U, replacing Georgy Pyatakov. Kviring relatively short tenure was marked by the end of World War I, which led the Soviets to anull the earlier Treaty of Brest-Litovsk, which had renounced their claims to Ukraine. After this, the Provisional Workers' and Peasants' Government of Ukraine was set up on 28 November to direct Soviet power amid hostilities, and Kviring was also elected to it. As part of the Provisional Government, he was elected as Chairman of the Department of People's Economy and Finance. As part of reforms, in January 1919 he also began chairing the Ukrainian Council of National Economy. With the start of the second phase of the Ukrainian–Soviet War, and the Soviet advance into Ukraine, Kviring also returned. The Soviets eventually retook the city of Kharkov, and in March 1919 the third congress of the CP(b)U was held there. However, during it, some members of the congress criticised his committee for not having taken up an uprising until late and for "weak leadership". Thus, at the end of the congress, he was dismissed from the post of First Secretary and replaced by Stanislav Kosior. He was, however, elected to the Politburo of the CP(b)U.

=== 1919-1923: Intermediary period and the Treaty of Riga ===
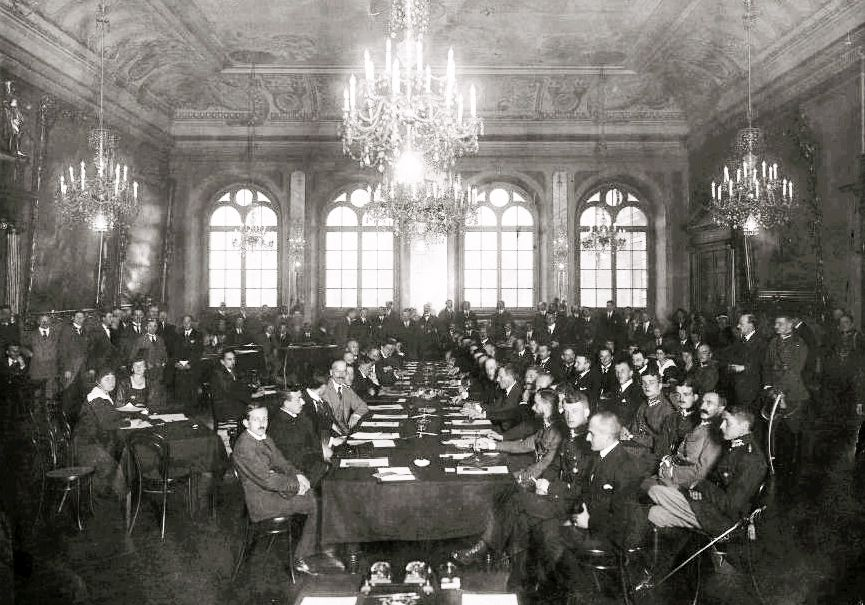
Members of the congress to the Treaty of Riga in 1920. On the left side is the Soviet delegation.

Following his dismissal, Kviring continued to chair the Ukrainian Council of National Economy, while being a member of the Politburo of the CP(b)U and its Foreign Bureau. As chairman, he continued to nationalise the industry of Ukraine, particularly in the Donbas, during the Russian Civil War. He also led the transfer of estates of those deemed as "kulaks", a task he did alongside Vasily Rakovsky and Vladimir Meshcheryakov. He was eventually transferred in the autumn of 1919 to be the assistant head of the political department for the 12th Army, which was in the area of Chernihiv at the time. In October, he then became a member of the newly created revkom for Chernihiv, with Chernihiv also being captured by the Soviets a month later, in November. After the city's capture, he was also appointed Chairman of National Economy for the Chernihiv revkom, and also briefly was head of the revkom's land department. In this regard, he helped organise land reform again, and distributed materials from those who were deemed "kulaks" also. After Yekaterinoslav was captured by the Red Army on 30 December 1919, Kviring was immediately moved there from Chernihiv. After he moved back there, he also headed the revkom for the Yekaterinoslav Governorate, in addition to being chair of the council of national economy and the executive committee presidium. While leading the city, he helped form volunteer battalions for the Polish–Soviet War, and also eventually organised its defense again due to the breakthrough of the White Army in Ukraine.

He was eventually dismissed from this post in November 1920, when he was called away to be part of the negotiations team for the Treaty of Riga as part of the Soviet delegation. His authorities, as approved by both Vladimir Lenin and the People's Commissar for Foreign Affairs, Georgy Chicherin, authorised him to both conclude and sign the treaty if need be, although the Soviet delegation was headed by Adolph Joffe. Upon coming to Riga, he was one of two diplomats who signed for the Ukrainian SSR alongside Yuriy Kotsiubynsky (all the others were from the Russian SSR). Mariusz Wołos, a historian and academic at the Polish Academy of Sciences, later described Kviring as a lesser-known Ukrainian delegate who, in his opinion, revealed Soviet policy towards Poland in his reports. Specifically, Wołos cited a draft paper Kviring made in November 1920, where Kviring stated that the main tasks of the delegation were to obtain Ukrainian territories that were said to be occupied by Poland (Volhynia and Eastern Galicia), and he also proposed forming a special committee that would present itself as independent to the Poles in order to do so, but would purposely try to agitate the Ukrainian minority in Poland in order to obtain unification with the Ukrainian SSR. In his opinion, Wołos states that this shows that the Soviet government was using terms like "occupation," showing that the government never respected the border and only said it was temporary.

After Riga, Kviring reportedly specifically asked to be sent to the Donbas, and in March 1921, he was appointed as head of the provincial party committee of the Donetsk Governorate. In Yuzivka, his main tasks were restarting mine production, which was evidently successful as the coal output of the Donbas rose from 272 to 350 million poods in a year. He also focused on the living conditions of the mine workers, although he also controversially purged the unions of members suspected of being Mensheviks, SRs, or anarchists. While still in the post, he attended the third session of the All-Ukrainian Central Executive Committee, where he argued for the creation of the Soviet Union on behalf of Yuzivka, Kiev, and Kharkov, which was eventually successful.

=== 1923-1925: Return to power and policies on Ukrainisation ===
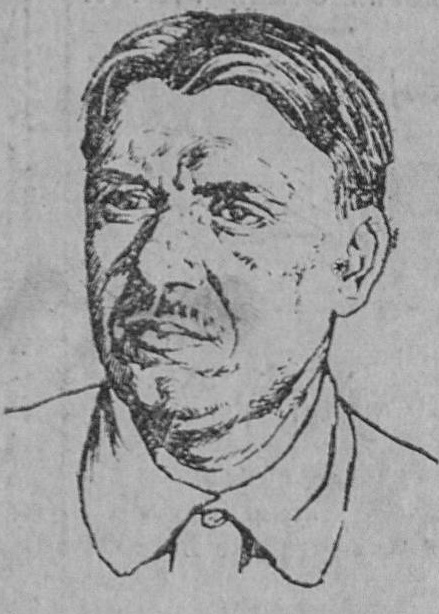
An official sketched portrait of Kviring from 1924.

Kviring was re-elected as First Secretary of the CP(b)U during the CP(b)U's 7th congress, which was held in early April 1923. During this congress, notably, the policy of Korenizatsiia was approved, with Ukrainisation specifically for the Ukrainian SSR also. Ukrainisation was mainly meant to neutralise ideas about Ukrainian independence by promoting the Ukrainian language and integration. After he took power, Kviring was very cautious about the ideas. Even prior, in 1922, he published the article "National Moments", which said that calls for Ukrainisation were laced with Ukrainian chauvinism, and that the Ukrainian culture did not need support, as it was already strongly embedded in the area. However, after he took office, in June 1923 he told a plenum that because "Ukrainian culture lagged behing Russian", it should be "privileged", at least for the time being, and that the Ukrainian language should be re-introduced into schools. During that summer, the decrees approving the Ukrainisation of schools were signed by Kviring, alongside making both Russian and Ukrainian have equal language rights in the Ukrainian SSR. In private, though, he expressed his views that Ukrainian chauvinists were taking advantage of the movement to complain about "forced Russification".

Kviring eventually reversed his public opinion in May 1924, telling the 8th Congress that Ukrainisation of what he called national minorities needed to stop, which he called forced. In retrospective accounts, different sources have said how harsh he was on the policies of Ukrainisation during this congress. According to BBC Ukraine, it was said he feared Ukrainisation and thought it would turn "Petliurist", so he hardly supported it. Babel says he heavily opposed Ukrainisation, while Ivan Koshelivets, a Ukrainian scholar, said he was "an open enemy of Ukrainian culture", but that he was not openly hostile because he did not care much about the movement and instead cared more about the events in Moscow.

In early 1925, it was said that the Ukrainian Politburo had raised the question of removing Kviring from the post of First Secretary, to which Kviring allegedly agreed, due to his opposition to Ukrainisation. Other sources say that Kviring wavered. Eventually, though, Vyacheslav Molotov was proposed to replace him, and he was asked to be sent from Moscow, although the Central Committee of the Communist Party of the Soviet Union disagreed and recommended Lazar Kaganovich, one of Stalin's closest allies. The People's Commissar for Education in Ukraine, Alexander Shumsky, in April 1925, reported that the party had done little in the two years under Kviring to actually promote Ukrainisation. Around the same time, it was reported that Kviring heavily supported Joseph Stalin's policies and voted to remove his rival Leon Trotsky. Thus, he also initially supported the troika of Stalin, Lev Kamanev, and Grigory Zinoviev. It was also said that Shumsky had initiated Kviring's removal by criticising his slow actions on Ukrainisation and saying that he had also wavered between Stalin and other figures, to which Stalin and Moscow reportedly agreed, to remove him.

== 1925-1937: Party work in Russia ==
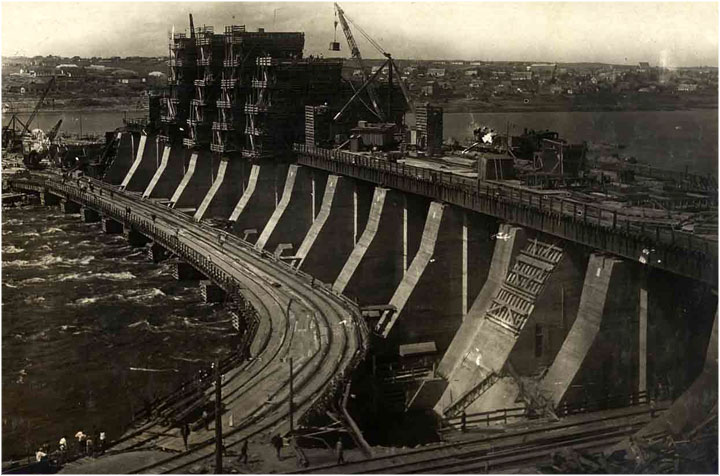
Whhile First Deputy Chairman of the VSNKh, Kviring was appointed overseer of the construction of the Dnieper Hydroelectric Station (pictured here in 1934), and he headed its special company, Dneprostroi.

After his removal, Kviring was reassigned to Moscow in the Russian SSR and appointed 2nd Deputy Chairman of the Supreme Council of the National Economy (VSNKh), which was then headed by Felix Dzerzhinsky. With the VSNKh, he mainly covered foreign trade and exports and imports with other countries. At the same time, he also began lecturing and writing again about the economy, which he published in Communist International. Kviring was eventually promoted to First Deputy a year later, in 1926, after Dzerzhinsky died and Valerian Kuybyshev became chairman. He was eventually transferred later that year, in December, to become Deputy Chairman of the State Planning Committee (Gosplan), which was then led by Gleb Krzhizhanovsky. During this time, he handled mainly power-station projects, such as those in Egorshino and Mineralnye Vody. He was also selected to oversee the construction of the Dnieper Hydroelectric Station, and was appointed chief of the special company for the project, Dneprostroi. As overseer, he mainly dealt with financing and supply for the project, and prepared reports on its foundation and completion.

He was eventually dismissed from both posts and reassigned to be Deputy People's Commissar for Railways in early 1931, before being appointed in March 1932 as Deputy Chairman of the Committee of Commodity Funds, which was assigned to the Council of Labour and Defence. Simultaneously, around this time, he headed the Economics Institute of Red Professors and the Institute of Economics of the Communist Academy, which led him to be awarded a Doctorate of Economic Sciences in 1934. Kviring was finally appointed, in April 1934, as First Deputy Chairman of Gosplan again under Valery Mezhlauk.

== Great Purge and Death ==
Prior to his death, Kviring lived in apartment 11 at 36 Malaya Bronnaya Street in Moscow. He was arrested on 16 October 1937 during the Great Purge, and he was eventually sentenced to death by the Military Collegium of the Supreme Court of the USSR. The collegium convicted him of treason and espionage for Germany because of his German background. He was executed on 25 November 1937 in Moscow, the same day as his sentencing by the collegium. He would only be rehabilitated posthumously during the Khrushchev thaw era in 1956. He was first rehabilitated by the collegium on 14 March and later reinstated by the CPSU on 27 March 1956.

== Personal life ==
His first wife was Dunya Gurina, with whom he had one son: Viktor. Viktor was born in 1912 in Saratov, and lived with both his mother and father up until Kviring's time in Yekaterinoslav. After Kviring was arrested there and sent to Irkutsk, Viktor and his mother moved to Saratov before they rejoined Kviring in the Siberian village of Malyshevka. After the February Revolution, Viktor and his mother moved with Kviring to Yekaterinoslav, where they remained even after Kviring's death until 1941, after which Viktor moved to Chelyabinsk and later Sverdlovsk (now Yekaterinburg). He died in 1988 of heart disease.

Emmanuel's elder brother, Erich, who had stayed with him in both St. Petersburg and initially Yekaterinoslav, was also an Old Bolshevik member. It is known that Erich served as chairman of the Saratov Governorate branch of the Cheka, the secret police in the USSR, in 1920. He later was also chairman of the Dagestan Oblast branch of the Cheka also in 1921. He later did party work in the Russian SSR, and, like his brother, was arrested in 1937 during the Great Purge, although his outcome is not known.

== Legacy ==
A monument to Kviring in Bakhmut, Ukraine, prior to its dismantling in 2015 during decommunisation.

An apartment building on Kviringa Street in Donetsk, Ukraine. The street is named after Kviring.

Within Ukraine, there were multiple streets and a monument dedicated to him. Within the eastern city of Bakhmut, there was a main monument dedicated to him, which was located on the territory of the non-ferrous metals processing plant. The non-ferrous metals processing plant at which it resided was also named after him. The monument was later dismantled in 2015 as part of the decommunisation, with the approval of the City Council of Artemivsk during an extraordinary session. After it was dismantled, it was initially proposed to leave the monument of Kviring, together with those of other Soviet figures, in an open field near the Remondis Artemivsk/Bakhmut enterprise. It was later revised that they would be sent to a museum, although it was not specified which. The mayor later said that the monument would be sent to a new open-air museum. Also within the city was a memorial plaque dedicated to him on the Bakhmut Raion Zemstvo Council, but it was later removed also, at least prior to 2022.

In terms of streets, within the former Leninskyi district of Donetsk, there is also a minor Kirivinga Street, which is about 1,500 metres. It has been named as such since at least 1963 because it was on that street that Kviring worked at a health insurance fund. During this time period, the deputy chairman of the City Council of Donetsk, a woman named Sumina, promised that a plaque with a bas-relief dedicated to him would be installed with an inscription about his connection to the city. Due to the War in the Donbas, the self-declared Donetsk People's Republic later annexed the area, and chose not to rename it. Within the city of Dnipro, there was also a former Kviringa Street, which was located near Mazepa Avenue in the microdistrict of Chechelivka. It was renamed back to its historical name, Belgiyskaya Street, on 24 November 2015 as part of decommunisation.

== Honours and awards ==
During his lifetime, Kviring was awarded the following honours:

- Order of the Badge of Honour (by the USSR)

== Bibliography ==
- Бачинский, П. П. (1968). Эммануил Ионович Квиринг [Emmanuel Ionovich Quiring]. Политиздат.
- Гамбарова, Ю. С.; Тимирязева., K.A.; Железнова, В.Я; Ковалевског, M. М.; Муромцева, C.A. (1924). Энциклопедический словарь Русского библио графического института Гранат [Encyclopedic Dictionary of the Russian Bibliographic Institute "Granat"] (41 ed.). Moscow: Гранат.
- Летопись революции [Chronicle of the Revolution] (2 ed.). Государственное издательство Украины. 1923.
- Борисёнок, Елена (2021). Сталинский проконсул Лазарь Каганович на Украине. Апогей советской украинизации (1925–1928) [Stalin's Proconsul Lazar Kaganovich in Ukraine: The Height of Soviet Ukrainisation (1925–1928)]. Алисторус.

Political offices
Preceded by ?	Director of the Economy Institute of Communist Academy; 1932–1937	Succeeded by ?
Preceded by ?	Chief of Department of National Economy and Finance; 1918–1919	Succeeded by ?
Party political offices
Preceded by Dmitry Manuilsky; Serafima Gopner	1st Secretary of the Communist Party of Ukraine; 1923–1925; 1918–1919	Succeeded by Lazar Kaganovich; Yuri Pyatakov
Preceded by Andrei Radchenko	Secretary of the Communist Party of Donetsk Governorate; 1921–1923	Succeeded by ?
Preceded by ?	Secretary of the Communist Party of Katerynoslav Governorate; 1919–1920	Succeeded by Aleksandr Kiselyov
