= Vasiliy Averin =

Russian politician

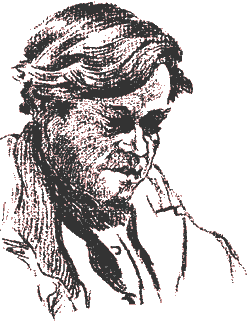
Portrait of Vasily Averin

Vasiliy Kuzmich Averin (Russian: Васи́лий Кузьмич Аве́рин; 1884 – 28 December 1945) was a Russian Bolshevik revolutionary, a leading member of the Cheka and a member of the Soviet government in Ukraine.

== Biography ==
Averin was born in 1884 or 1885 near Rognedino in the Roslavlsky Uyezd of the Smolensk Governorate of the Russian Empire (today Rognedinsky District, Bryansk Oblast, Russia) in a poor peasant family. In 1903 he joined the Russian Social Democratic Labour Party and in 1904 sided with Bolsheviks. Averin was uneducated and worked as a mechanic. Averin began his revolutionary career in Ekaterinoslav, where in October 1905 he headed a factory committee of the RSDLP. During World War I in 1915 Averin was arrested and exiled to the Irkutsk Governorate. He was released in April 1917 on amnesty due to the February Revolution in Russia and returned to Ekaterinoslav.

Averin was a member of the All-Russian Congress of Soviets, the All-Russian Central Executive Committee, and the Russian Constituent Assembly. Along with Yakov Peters, Felix Dzerzhinsky and others, he was a member of the original Cheka. In December 1917 Averin was appointed to head the military revolutionary headquarters of the Ekaterinoslav Soviet and actively participated in the Ekaterinoslav Bolshevik uprising.

With the advance of the German troops, Averin was placed in charge of the defense of the Ekaterinoslav district. He later was appointed as a chief of political department for the Ukrainian Front (also referred to as the Ukrainian Soviet Army). There is some evidence that he also headed a commissariat of internal affairs of the Soviet Ukraine in the beginning of 1919. In 1919 Averin chaired the Ekaterinoslav council and later was a governor of the Volhynia and Kharkiv governorates. In 1921-23 Averin was a governor and mayor of Odessa, while at that time being a member of the Central Committee of the Communist Party of Ukraine. In 1923 Averin became the Left Opposition of Bolsheviks (Trotsky's followers). At around that time he also was a member of the Central Executive Committee of the Ukrainian SSR and the Central Executive Committee of the Soviet Union.

In 1935 Averin was appointed the chief of the Lena River Shipping Company and transferred to Yakutsk. There in 1937 he was arrested and sentenced to eight years in correctional camps. Averin was released after World War II in November 1945. On 28 December 1945, he was strangled to death by an unknown person. On 29 November 1955, Averin was rehabilitated by the Supreme Court of the Yakut ASSR.
