= Outline of Ukrainian history =

Outline of Wikipedia articles about Ukrainian history

This is a topical guide to articles about the History of Ukraine.

Ukraine (Note: /juːˈkreɪn/ yoo-KRAYN; Ukrainian: Україна, romanised: Ukraina, pronounced [ʊkrɐˈjinɐ]) is a country in Eastern Europe. It is the second-largest country in Europe by area, after Russia, which borders it to the east and northeast. (Note: Ukraine has been and still is a contested area with territory frequently occupied and annexed from it by Russia and other eastern and central European powers.) It also borders Belarus to the north; Poland and Slovakia to the west; Hungary, Romania and Moldova to the southwest; and the Black Sea and the Sea of Azov to the south and southeast. (Note: Ukrainian territories on the Sea of Azov were occupied and annexed by Russia in 2014 (Crimea) and in 2022 (Donetsk, Zaporizhzhia oblasts and other areas in southern and eastern Ukraine). The United Nations General Assembly condemned both annexations as illegal.) Kyiv is the capital and largest city, followed by Kharkiv, Odesa and Dnipro. The official language is Ukrainian. Ukraine covers 603,628 km^{2} (233,062 sq mi), and has an estimated population of 39 million as of 2025.

Ukrainian history starts with the Kyivan Rus', the medieval state centered on Kyiv, which the Mongol invasion of 1240 broke apart. Rule from outside followed for four centuries, first from the Grand Duchy of Lithuania, and then the Polish–Lithuanian Commonwealth, until the Cossack uprising of 1648 created a Hetmanate that lasted under Russian suzerainty until Catherine II abolished it. By 1800 the territory was split between the Russian Empire and the Habsburg monarchy, and the national movement grew differently on each side of that line. As a result of World War I, and its aftermath in the Russian Revolution and Civil War, both the Russian Empire and the Austro-Hungarian Empire fell in 1917, and the Ukrainian People's Republic that emerged lasted only until the Bolsheviks crushed it in 1921. Seven decades of Soviet rule followed, which included the Holodomor, and then Second World War and the Holocaust in Ukraine. Independence came in 1991, and the period since has been shaped by disputes over Ukraine's alignment: the Orange Revolution, the Maidan of 2013–14 and the Russian invasions from 2014 to the present.

== Overviews ==
- History of Ukraine - (c. 32,000 BCE–present) - Survey of Ukrainian history from prehistory to the present.
- Name of Ukraine - History and etymology of the country's name.

== Archaeological cultures in Ukraine ==
- Bug–Dniester culture - (c. 6300–5500 BCE) - Neolithic culture between the Southern Bug and Dniester rivers.
- Catacomb culture - (2500–1950 BCE) - Bronze Age steppe culture.
- Chernoles culture - (c. 1050–725 BCE) - Forest steppe culture linked to early Slavic and Scythian farmers.
- Chernyakhov culture - (c. 200–500 CE) - Multi-ethnic culture of the Roman period associated with the Goths.
- Cucuteni–Trypillia culture - (c. 5050–2950 BCE) - Neolithic–Eneolithic culture of southeastern Europe.
- Dnieper–Donets culture - (c. 5000–4200 BCE) - Prehistoric culture north of the Black Sea.
- Middle Dnieper culture - (c. 3200–2300 BCE) - Archaeological culture of the Dnieper basin and Belarus.
- Multi-cordoned ware culture - (c. 2200–1800 BCE) - Bronze Age steppe culture.
- Repin culture - (c. 3950–3300 BCE) - Eneolithic culture of Eastern Europe.
- Scythian culture - (c. 900–200 BCE) - Culture of the Iron Age nomads of the Pontic steppe.
- Sredny Stog culture - (c. 4500–3500 BCE) - Eneolithic culture of the Dnieper–Don steppe.
- Srubnaya culture - (c. 1850–1450 BCE) - Late Bronze Age culture of the Volga–Ural and Pontic steppe.
- Usatove culture - (c. 3500–3000 BCE) - Late Trypillian steppe culture near the northwestern Black Sea coast.
- Yamnaya culture - (c. 3300–2600 BCE) - Archaeological culture of the Pontic steppe.
- Zarubintsy culture - (3rd century BCE–1st century CE) - Iron Age culture of Eastern Europe.

== Pre-modern history ==
=== Ancient history ===
- Scythia - (c. 700–300 BCE) - Region of Eurasia in antiquity.
- Tyras - (c. 600 BCE–c. 400 CE) - Ancient Greek city-state on the Dniester estuary.
- Scythian campaign of Darius I - (513 BCE) - Achaemenid expedition into Scythia.
- Sarmatians - (5th century BCE–4th century CE) - Large Iranian confederation of classical antiquity.
- Bosporan Kingdom - (c. 438 BCE–c. 527 CE) - Greco-Scythian state near the Sea of Azov.
- Crimea in the Roman era - (47 BCE–c. 340 CE) - Crimea under Roman rule.
- Oium - (3rd century–4th century) - Gothic area of Scythia.

=== Medieval history ===
- Antes people - (6th century–602) - Early Slavic people of Eastern Europe in the Early Middle Ages.
- Polans (eastern) - (6th century–9th century) - East Slavic tribe around the middle Dnieper and Kiev.
- Dulebes - (6th century–10th century) - Early Slavic tribal union in Volhynia.
- White Croats - (7th century–10th century) - Early Slavic tribe and ethnic group.
- Saltovo-Mayaki culture - (700–950) - Early Slavic archaeological culture of the Pontic steppe.
- Route from the Varangians to the Greeks - (c. 800–1100) - Medieval trade route between Scandinavia and the Byzantine Empire.
- Fortress of Tustan - (9th century–16th century) - Rock-cut fortress and customs post in the Carpathians.
- Rus' Khaganate - (c. 830–890s) - Early Rus' polity in Eastern Europe.
- Kievan Rus' - (c. 880–1240) - East Slavic state centered on Kiev.
- Cumania - (10th century–1241) - Turkic confederation of tribes on the Pontic steppe.
- Cumans - (11th century–1241) - Turkic nomadic people.
- Brodnici - (12th century–13th century) - People of the lower Danube and Dniester region.
- Disintegration of Kievan Rus' - (1132–1240) - Political fragmentation of the Rus' lands.
- Kingdom of Galicia–Volhynia - (1199–1349) - Kingdom in Eastern Europe.

== Modern pre-Soviet history ==
=== Early modern history ===
- Little Russia - (14th century–20th century) - Historic and geographic term for Ukraine.
- Ruthenian Voivodeship - (1434–1772) - Historical region in the Kingdom of Poland.
- Podolian Voivodeship - (1434–1793) - Voivodeship in the Kingdom of Poland.
- Kiev Voivodeship - (1471–1793) - Subdivision of the Grand Duchy of Lithuania and the Kingdom of Poland.
- Opryshky - (16th century–19th century) - Outlaw bands and rebel movement in the Carpathian Mountains.
- Russo-Turkish wars - (1568–1918) - Series of conflicts between the Russian and Ottoman empires.
- Polish–Lithuanian Commonwealth - (1569–1795) - Aristocratic republic in Europe.
- Volhynian Voivodeship (1569–1795) - (1569–1795) - Voivodeship in Lithuania, then Poland.
- Sloboda Ukraine - (17th century–18th century) - Historical region straddling present-day Ukraine and Russia.
- Ukrainian Baroque - (17th century–18th century) - Distinctive Baroque style in architecture and art.
- Khmelnytsky Uprising - (1648–1657) - Cossack rebellion in the Polish–Lithuanian Commonwealth.
- Left-bank Ukraine - (1667–1793) - Historical region east of the Dnieper.
- Right-bank Ukraine - (1667–1793) - Historical region west of the Dnieper.
- Constitution of Pylyp Orlyk - (1710) - Constitution drawn up for the Cossack Hetmanate by Hetman Pylyp Orlyk.
- Koliivshchyna - (1768) - Haidamaka peasant and Cossack rebellion on the right bank.

=== Crimean Khanate ===
- Black Sea slave trade - (antiquity–19th century) - Trafficking of people across the Black Sea.
- Giray dynasty - (1431–1783) - Ruling dynasty of the Crimean Khanate.
- Crimean–Nogai slave raids in Eastern Europe - (1441–1774) - Ottoman-backed Turkic raids for captives.
- Crimean Khanate - (1441–1783) - Crimean Tatar state.
- List of Crimean khans - (1441–1783) - Rulers of the Crimean Khanate.

=== Cossack Hetmanate ===
- Zaporozhian Host - (15th century–18th century) - Military forces of the Zaporozhian Cossacks.
- Zaporozhian Cossacks - (c. 15th century–1775) - Cossack host centered on the lower Dnieper.
- Cossack Hetmanate - (1648–1764) - Cossack state under Russian suzerainty.

=== Zaporozhian Sich ===
- Zaporozhian Sich - (c. 1552–1775) - Fortified Cossack polity beyond the Dnieper rapids.
- Nova Sich - (1734–1775) - Last of the Cossack Siches, on the lower Dnieper.
- Liquidation of the Zaporozhian Sich - (1775) - Russian destruction of the Cossack polity.

== History of Ukraine (1795–1918) ==
- Ukrainian national revival - (c. 1798–1900) - Movement to revive Ukrainian language, culture and national identity.

=== Ukraine in World War I ===
- Battle of Galicia - (1914) - Battle on the Eastern Front of World War I.
- Ukraine during World War I - (1914–1918) - Ukrainian lands under Russian and Austro-Hungarian rule during the war.
- Ukrainian Sich Riflemen - (1914–1920) - Ukrainian unit of the Austro-Hungarian army.
- Brusilov offensive - (1916) - Russian offensive on the Eastern Front.
- Kerensky offensive - (1917) - Last Russian offensive of World War I.
- 1918 Ukrainian coup d'état - (1918) - Coup d'état in the Ukrainian People's Republic.
- Treaty of Brest-Litovsk (Ukraine–Central Powers) - (1918) - Peace treaty between the Ukrainian People's Republic and the Central Powers.

== Russian Revolution and Soviet era ==
=== Ukrainian War of Independence ===
- Free Cossacks - (1917–1918) - Volunteer self-defense militia.
- Russian Civil War - (1917–1922) - Multi-party war in the former Russian Empire.
- Ukrainian War of Independence - (1917–1921) - Series of conflicts over Ukrainian statehood.
- Ukrainian–Soviet War - (1917–1921) - War between Ukrainian forces and the Bolsheviks.
- Anti-Hetman Uprising - (1918) - Revolt against Hetman Pavlo Skoropadsky.
- Battle of Kruty - (1918) - Battle of the Ukrainian–Soviet War.
- Battle of Lemberg (1918) - (1918) - Fight for Lviv in the Polish–Ukrainian War.
- Crimea Operation (1918) - (1918) - German and Ukrainian offensive into Crimea.
- Kiev Arsenal January Uprising - (1918) - Bolshevik-organized workers' revolt.
- Operation Faustschlag - (1918) - Last action on the Eastern Front of World War I.
- Polish–Ukrainian War - (1918–1919) - Conflict between the Second Polish Republic and Ukrainian forces.
- Soviet westward offensive of 1918–1919 - (1918–1919) - Red Army advance following the German withdrawal.
- 1919 Soviet invasion of Ukraine - (1919) - Red Army offensive that drove the Directorate from Kiev.
- Battle of Peregonovka - (1919) - Battle of the Russian Civil War.
- First Winter Campaign - (1919–1920) - Ukrainian People's Army raid behind Soviet and White lines.
- Hryhoriv Uprising - (1919) - Anti-Bolshevik revolt led by Otaman Nykyfor Hryhoriv.
- Hutsul Republic - (1919) - Unrecognized state in the Hutsul region of Transcarpathia.
- Kholodny Yar Republic - (1919–1922) - Ukrainian partisan state.
- Polish–Soviet War - (1919–1921) - Conflict between Poland and Soviet Russia.
- Bolshevik–Makhnovist conflict - (1920–1921) - Falling-out between the Bolsheviks and the Makhnovists.
- Galician Soviet Socialist Republic - (1920) - Bolshevik state in eastern Galicia.
- Kiev offensive (1920) - (1920) - Polish and allied Ukrainian offensive that briefly captured Kiev.
- Second Winter Campaign - (1921) - Final campaign of the Ukrainian People's Army.
- Treaty of Riga - (1921) - Treaty that ended the Polish–Soviet War.

=== Ukrainian People's Republic ===
- Central Rada - (1917–1918) - Legislature of the Ukrainian People's Republic.
- Free Cossacks - (1917–1918) - Volunteer self-defense militia.
- Sich Riflemen - (1917–1919) - Infantry formation of the Ukrainian People's Republic drawn from Galician volunteers.
- Ukraine after the Russian Revolution - (1917–1921) - Period of competing Ukrainian, Bolshevik and White authorities.
- Ukrainian People's Army - (1917–1921) - Army of the Ukrainian People's Republic.
- Ukrainian People's Republic - (1917–1921) - State proclaimed in the wake of the Russian Revolution.
- 1918 Central Powers occupation of Ukraine - (1918) - Military occupation by German and Austro-Hungarian forces.
- 1918 Ukrainian coup d'état - (1918) - Coup d'état in the Ukrainian People's Republic.
- Directorate of Ukraine - (1918–1920) - Governing committee of the Ukrainian People's Republic.
- Ukrainian Galician Army - (1918–1919) - Army of the West Ukrainian People's Republic.
- Ukrainian Soviet Republic - (1918) - Bolshevik-proclaimed socialist state.
- Ukrainian State - (1918) - Client state of the German Empire under Hetman Skoropadsky.
- West Ukrainian People's Republic - (1918–1919) - Short-lived state in eastern Galicia.
- Ukrainian Death Triangle - (1919) - Military situation at the end of World War I.
- Government of the Ukrainian People's Republic in exile - (1921–1992) - Government in exile.
- Mykhailo Hrushevsky - (1866–1934) - Ukrainian historian and politician.
- Pavlo Skoropadsky - (1873–1945) - Cossack officer who ruled as Hetman of the Ukrainian State.
- Andriy Livytskyi - (1879–1954) - Ukrainian politician, diplomat and lawyer.
- Symon Petliura - (1879–1926) - Ukrainian military leader.
- Volodymyr Vynnychenko - (1880–1951) - Writer and first head of government of the Ukrainian People's Republic.
- Isaak Mazepa - (1884–1952) - Ukrainian politician.
- Mykola Livytskyi - (1907–1989) - Ukrainian-American politician.
- Mykola Plaviuk - (1925–2012) - Ukrainian political activist.

=== Russian Revolution in Ukraine ===
- Central Rada - (1917–1918) - Legislature of the Ukrainian People's Republic.
- Crimean People's Republic - (1917–1918) - Self-declared state in Crimea.
- Kiev Bolshevik Uprising - (1917) - Bolshevik uprising in Kiev.
- Ukraine after the Russian Revolution - (1917–1921) - Period of competing Ukrainian, Bolshevik and White authorities.
- Ukrainian People's Republic - (1917–1921) - State proclaimed in the wake of the Russian Revolution.
- Ukrainian People's Republic of Soviets - (1917–1918) - Soviet republic aligned with the Russian SFSR.
- Borotbists - (1918–1920) - Left-wing party of Ukrainian socialist revolutionaries.
- Communist Party of Ukraine (Soviet Union) - (1918–1991) - Ruling party of Soviet Ukraine, banned after independence.
- Crimean Regional Government - (1918–1919) - Successive regimes on the Crimean Peninsula.
- Directorate of Ukraine - (1918–1920) - Governing committee of the Ukrainian People's Republic.
- Free soviets - (1918–1921) - Basic form of organization in the Makhnovshchina.
- Makhnovshchina - (1918–1921) - Ukrainian anarchist movement.
- Odessa Soviet Republic - (1918) - Short-lived Soviet republic centered on Odesa.
- Provisional Workers' and Peasants' Government of Ukraine - (1918–1919) - Bolshevik government set up in opposition to the Directorate.
- Ukrainian Soviet Republic - (1918) - Bolshevik-proclaimed socialist state.
- West Ukrainian People's Republic - (1918–1919) - Short-lived state in eastern Galicia.
- Crimean Socialist Soviet Republic - (1919) - Soviet state in Crimea.
- Regional Congress of Peasants, Workers and Insurgents - (1919–1920) - Decision-making assembly of the Makhnovist movement.
- Ukrainian Soviet Socialist Republic - (1919–1991) - Constituent republic of the Soviet Union.
- Georgy Pyatakov - (1890–1937) - Ukrainian revolutionary and politician.

=== Ukraine in the Russian Civil War ===
- Russian Civil War - (1917–1922) - Multi-party war in the former Russian Empire.
- Southern Front of the Russian Civil War - (1917–1921) - Military theater of the Russian Civil War.
- Ukrainian War of Independence - (1917–1921) - Series of conflicts over Ukrainian statehood.
- Ukrainian–Soviet War - (1917–1921) - War between Ukrainian forces and the Bolsheviks.
- Anti-Hetman Uprising - (1918) - Revolt against Hetman Pavlo Skoropadsky.
- Battle of Kruty - (1918) - Battle of the Ukrainian–Soviet War.
- Central Powers intervention in the Russian Civil War - (1918–1920) - German, Austro-Hungarian and Ottoman operations in the former Russian Empire.
- Donetsk–Krivoy Rog Soviet Republic - (1918) - Self-declared Soviet republic in the Donbas.
- Kiev Arsenal January Uprising - (1918) - Bolshevik-organized workers' revolt.
- Makhnovshchina - (1918–1921) - Ukrainian anarchist movement.
- Red Cossacks - (1918–1939) - Bolshevik Cossack military unit.
- Revolutionary Insurgent Army of Ukraine - (1918–1921) - Anarchist army of peasants and workers.
- Ukrainian Soviet Army - (1918–1919) - Bolshevik military formation raised in Ukraine.
- 1919 Soviet invasion of Ukraine - (1919) - Red Army offensive that drove the Directorate from Kiev.
- Battle of Peregonovka - (1919) - Battle of the Russian Civil War.
- Chyhyryn Soviet Republic - (1919) - Short-lived Soviet republic around Chyhyryn.
- Hryhoriv Uprising - (1919) - Anti-Bolshevik revolt led by Otaman Nykyfor Hryhoriv.
- Kholodny Yar Republic - (1919–1922) - Ukrainian partisan state.
- Polish–Soviet War - (1919–1921) - Conflict between Poland and Soviet Russia.
- Ukrainian Death Triangle - (1919) - Military situation at the end of World War I.
- Bolshevik–Makhnovist conflict - (1920–1921) - Falling-out between the Bolsheviks and the Makhnovists.
- Galician Soviet Socialist Republic - (1920) - Bolshevik state in eastern Galicia.
- Nestor Makhno - (1888–1934) - Ukrainian anarchist revolutionary.
- Fedir Shchus - (1893–1921) - Ukrainian anarchist and military commander.
- Semen Karetnyk - (1893–1920) - Ukrainian revolutionary.

=== Ukrainian Soviet Socialist Republic ===
- Communist Party of Ukraine (Soviet Union) - (1918–1991) - Ruling party of Soviet Ukraine, banned after independence.
- Emblem of the Ukrainian Soviet Socialist Republic - (1919–1991) - State emblem of the Ukrainian SSR.
- Flag of the Ukrainian Soviet Socialist Republic - (1919–1991) - Flag of the Ukrainian SSR.
- Ukrainian Soviet Socialist Republic - (1919–1991) - Constituent republic of the Soviet Union.

=== Interwar Soviet Ukraine ===
- Executed Renaissance - (c. 1920–1938) - Generation of writers and artists destroyed by Stalinist repression.
- 1921–1923 famine in Ukraine - (1921–1923) - Famine in the south brought on by drought and grain requisitioning.
- Ahatanhel Krymsky - (1871–1942) - Ukrainian academic.
- Alexander Dovzhenko - (1894–1956) - Soviet-Ukrainian filmmaker.
- Causes of the Holodomor - (1932–1933) - Debate over collectivization, requisitioning and Soviet policy as causes of the famine.
- Collectivization in the Ukrainian Soviet Socialist Republic - (1928–1933) - Collectivization campaign in Soviet Ukraine.
- Holodomor genocide question - (1932–1933) - Debate over whether the famine amounted to genocide.
- Holodomor - (1932–1933) - Man-made famine in Soviet Ukraine.
- Law of Spikelets - (1932) - Soviet decree on theft of grain from collective farms.
- League of Ukrainian Nationalists - (1925–1929) - Nationalist group that merged into the OUN.
- Les Kurbas - (1887–1937) - Ukrainian theater director.
- Mykola Khvylovy - (1893–1933) - Ukrainian author.
- Ukrainization - (1923–1933) - Soviet policy promoting the Ukrainian language and culture.
- Valerian Pidmohylny - (1901–1937) - Ukrainian novelist.
- Vinnytsia massacre - (1937–1938) - Mass executions carried out by the NKVD near Vinnytsia.

=== Ukraine in World War II ===
- Organisation of Ukrainian Nationalists - (1929–1940) - Ukrainian nationalist movement.
- Act of restoration of the Ukrainian state - (1941) - Nationalist proclamation of a Ukrainian state in Lviv.
- Anti-Soviet resistance by the Ukrainian Insurgent Army - (1944–1960) - Nationalist insurgency against the Soviet Union.
- Carpatho-Ukraine - (1938–1939) - Short-lived autonomous region and unrecognized state.
- Dmytro Klyachkivsky - (1911–1945) - Ukrainian Insurgent Army commander.
- Dnieper–Carpathian offensive - (1943–1944) - Soviet offensive that cleared German forces from the right bank.
- Donbas strategic offensive (August 1943) - (1943) - Red Army offensive that retook the Donbas.
- German occupation of Crimea during World War II - (1941–1944) - Axis occupation of the Crimean Peninsula.
- Hungarian invasion of Carpatho-Ukraine - (1939) - Hungarian occupation following the region's declaration of independence.
- Massacres of Poles in Volhynia and Eastern Galicia - (1943–1945) - Massacres of Poles by Ukrainian nationalists.
- Nikopol–Krivoi Rog offensive - (1944) - Soviet offensive in the lower Dnieper region.
- Odessa Offensive - (1944) - Soviet offensive that retook Odesa.
- Reichskommissariat Ukraine - (1941–1944) - German civil administration over the occupied territory.
- Roman Shukhevych - (1907–1950) - Ukrainian nationalist militant.
- Soviet annexation of Eastern Galicia and Volhynia - (1939) - Soviet takeover of Polish-ruled territory under the Molotov–Ribbentrop Pact.
- Soviet occupation of Bessarabia and Northern Bukovina - (1940) - Soviet annexation of territory taken from Romania.
- Stepan Bandera - (1909–1959) - Ukrainian nationalist leader.
- Ukraine in World War II - (1939–1945) - Ukrainian lands under Soviet, German, Romanian and Hungarian rule.
- Ukrainian Insurgent Army - (1942–1949) - Ukrainian nationalist partisan army.
- Vasyl Kuk - (1913–2007) - Ukrainian nationalist activist, militant and academic.
- Young Guard (Soviet resistance) - (1942–1943) - Anti-fascist group in occupied Krasnodon.

==== The Holocaust and Nazi collaboration ====
- 14th Waffen Grenadier Division of the SS (1st Galician) - (1943–1945) - Ukrainian division of the Waffen-SS.
- 1941 Odessa massacre - (1941) - Romanian massacre of Jews in occupied Odesa.
- Babi Yar - (1941–1943) - Ravine in Kyiv and site of mass shootings of Jews.
- Bogdanovka concentration camp - (1941–1942) - Romanian concentration camp for Jews in the Transnistria Governorate.
- Ivanhorod Einsatzgruppen photograph - (1942) - Photograph of an Einsatzgruppen killing.
- Nachtigall Battalion - (1941) - German-controlled Ukrainian military unit.
- Roland Battalion - (1941) - Abwehr-formed Ukrainian battalion, counterpart to the Nachtigall Battalion.
- Syrets concentration camp - (1942–1943) - Nazi concentration camp on the outskirts of Kyiv.
- The Holocaust in Ukraine - (1941–1944) - Mass murder of Ukraine's Jews under German and Romanian occupation.
- Ukrainian collaboration with Nazi Germany - (1941–1945) - Collaboration by auxiliaries, officials and military units under occupation.

=== Postwar Soviet Ukraine ===
- Population exchange between Poland and Soviet Ukraine - (1944–1946) - Transfers of Poles and Ukrainians across the new postwar border.
- 1979 Dniprodzerzhynsk mid-air collision - (1979) - Mid-air collision that killed everyone aboard both aircraft.
- 1989 Soviet miners' strikes - (1989) - Mass coal-miner strikes in the Donbas and other Soviet basins.
- Anthem of the Ukrainian Soviet Socialist Republic - (1949–1991) - Anthem of the Ukrainian SSR.
- Internationalism or Russification? - (1965) - Book by Ivan Dziuba attacking Soviet nationality policy.
- Kramatorsk radiological accident - (1980–1989) - Radiation exposure caused by a lost caesium capsule sealed in an apartment wall.
- Operation Vistula - (1947) - Forced resettlement of Ukrainians within Poland.
- Repatriation of Poles (1955–1959) - (1955–1959) - Return of Poles from the Soviet Union to Poland.
- Sixtiers - (1950s–1960s) - Generation of Ukrainian writers and dissidents.
- Soviet annexation of Transcarpathia - (1945–1946) - Transfer of Transcarpathia from Czechoslovakia.
- Soviet famine of 1946–1947 in Ukraine - (1946–1947) - Postwar famine caused by drought and continued state grain procurement.
- Transfer of Crimea to Ukraine - (1954) - Territorial transfer within the Soviet Union.

==== Chernobyl disaster ====
- Chernobyl Nuclear Power Plant - (1977–2000) - Decommissioned nuclear power plant near Pripyat.
- Chernobyl disaster - (1986) - Nuclear accident at reactor No. 4.
- Chernobyl exclusion zone - (1986–present) - Restricted area around the destroyed reactor.
- Chernobyl Mi-8 helicopter crash - (1986) - Helicopter crash during the cleanup operation.
- Deaths due to the Chernobyl disaster - (1986–present) - Deaths attributed to the accident.
- Effects of the Chernobyl disaster - (1986–present) - Health, environmental and economic consequences of the accident.
- Elephant's Foot (Chernobyl) - (1986–present) - Radioactive mass created during the meltdown.
- Investigations into the Chernobyl disaster - (1986–present) - Soviet and international inquiries into the causes of the accident.
- Outline of the Chernobyl disaster - (1986–present) - Structured index of topics relating to the accident.
- Slavutych - (1986–present) - City built to rehouse workers from the plant.

== Independent Ukraine ==
=== Ukraine before 2014 ===
- 1989–1991 Ukrainian revolution - (1989–1991) - Mass movement that led to independence.
- 1991 Ukrainian independence referendum - (1991) - Vote approving the Declaration of Independence.
- 1991 Ukrainian presidential election - (1991) - First presidential election of independent Ukraine, won by Leonid Kravchuk.
- Declaration of Independence of Ukraine - (1991) - Act declaring independence from the Soviet Union.
- Declaration of State Sovereignty of Ukraine - (1990) - Resolution of the Verkhovna Rada declaring sovereignty.
- Euromaidan - (2013–2014) - Protests sparked by the government's turn away from the European Union.
- Orange Revolution - (2004–2005) - Protests against a rigged presidential election.
- People's Movement of Ukraine - (1989–present) - Pro-independence organization, later a political party.
- Revolution of Dignity - (2014) - Uprising that ousted President Viktor Yanukovych.
- Revolution on Granite - (1990) - Student hunger strike and protests in Kyiv.
- Ukraine without Kuchma - (2000–2001) - Protest campaign against President Leonid Kuchma.
- Ukrainian involvement in the Iraq War - (2003–2008) - Ukrainian military participation in the Iraq War.

=== Ukraine since 2014 ===
- Ukraine in the 2026 Iran war - (2026–present) - Ukrainian involvement in the war with Iran.

=== Russo-Ukrainian war ===
- 2014 Crimean status referendum - (2014) - Referendum on Crimea's status held under Russian military control.
- 2014 Russian annexation of Crimea - (2014) - Russian seizure and annexation of the Crimean Peninsula.
- Allegations of genocide of Ukrainians in the Russian invasion of Ukraine - (2022–present) - Debate over whether Russian conduct in the invasion amounts to genocide.
- Attacks on civilians in the Russian invasion of Ukraine - (2022–present) - Strikes and other attacks on the civilian population.
- Belarusian involvement in the 2022 Russian invasion of Ukraine - (2022–present) - Use of Belarusian territory and infrastructure to support the invasion.
- Chechen involvement in the 2022 Russian invasion of Ukraine - (2022–present) - Chechen units fighting on both sides of the war.
- Child abductions in the Russo-Ukrainian war - (2014–present) - Deportation and forced transfer of Ukrainian children to Russia and Russian-held territory.
- Outline of the Russo-Ukrainian war - (2014–present) - Structured index of topics relating to the war.
- Prelude to the 2022 Russian invasion of Ukraine - (2021–2022) - Russian military buildup and diplomatic crisis before the full-scale invasion.
- Russian annexation of Donetsk, Kherson, Luhansk and Zaporizhzhia oblasts - (2022) - Russian annexation of four partly occupied oblasts.
- Russo-Ukrainian war (2022–present) - (2022–present) - Full-scale Russian invasion and the war that followed.
- Russo-Ukrainian war - (2014–present) - Ongoing conflict between Russia and Ukraine.
- Sexual violence in the 2022 Russian invasion of Ukraine - (2022–present) - Rape and other sexual violence documented in occupied areas.
- Ukrainian resistance during the 2022 Russian invasion of Ukraine - (2022–present) - Armed and civil resistance under Russian occupation.
- War crimes in the 2022 Russian invasion of Ukraine - (2022–present) - Violations of the laws of war attributed to the belligerents.
- War in Donbas - (2014–2022) - Fighting in the east between Ukraine and Russian-backed forces.

== People ==
- Stepan Bandera - (1909–1959) - Ukrainian nationalist leader.
- Alexander Dovzhenko - (1894–1956) - Soviet-Ukrainian filmmaker.
- Mykhailo Hrushevsky - (1866–1934) - Ukrainian historian and politician.
- Semen Karetnyk - (1893–1920) - Ukrainian revolutionary.
- Mykola Khvylovy - (1893–1933) - Ukrainian author.
- Dmytro Klyachkivsky - (1911–1945) - Ukrainian Insurgent Army commander.
- Ahatanhel Krymsky - (1871–1942) - Ukrainian academic.
- Vasyl Kuk - (1913–2007) - Ukrainian nationalist activist, militant and academic.
- Les Kurbas - (1887–1937) - Ukrainian theater director.
- Andriy Livytskyi - (1879–1954) - Ukrainian politician, diplomat and lawyer.
- Mykola Livytskyi - (1907–1989) - Ukrainian-American politician.
- Nestor Makhno - (1888–1934) - Ukrainian anarchist revolutionary.
- Isaak Mazepa - (1884–1952) - Ukrainian politician.
- Symon Petliura - (1879–1926) - Ukrainian military leader.
- Valerian Pidmohylny - (1901–1937) - Ukrainian novelist.
- Mykola Plaviuk - (1925–2012) - Ukrainian political activist.
- Georgy Pyatakov - (1890–1937) - Ukrainian revolutionary and politician.
- Fedir Shchus - (1893–1921) - Ukrainian anarchist and military commander.
- Roman Shukhevych - (1907–1950) - Ukrainian nationalist militant.
- Pavlo Skoropadsky - (1873–1945) - Cossack officer who ruled as Hetman of the Ukrainian State.
- Volodymyr Vynnychenko - (1880–1951) - Writer and first head of government of the Ukrainian People's Republic.

== Topical ==
=== Famines in Ukraine ===
- 1921–1923 famine in Ukraine - (1921–1923) - Famine in the south brought on by drought and grain requisitioning.
- Causes of the Holodomor - (1932–1933) - Debate over collectivization, requisitioning and Soviet policy as causes of the famine.
- Holodomor genocide question - (1932–1933) - Debate over whether the famine amounted to genocide.
- Holodomor - (1932–1933) - Man-made famine in Soviet Ukraine.
- Law of Spikelets - (1932) - Soviet decree on theft of grain from collective farms

=== Chernobyl disaster ===
- See section above on Chernobyl

=== Ukraine history-related lists ===
Timeline of the Russo-Ukrainian war (2022–present)
- Prelude; (up to 23 February 2022); Initial invasion; (24 February – 7 April 2022); Southeastern front; (8 April – 28 August 2022); 2022 Ukrainian counteroffensives; (29 August – 11 November 2022); Second stalemate; (12 November 2022 – 7 June 2023); 2023 Ukrainian counteroffensive; (8 June 2023 – 31 August 2023); 2023 Ukrainian counteroffensive, cont.; (1 September – 30 November 2023); 2023–2024 winter campaigns; (1 December 2023 – 31 March 2024); 2024 spring and summer campaigns; (1 April – 31 July 2024); 2024 summer–autumn offensives; (1 August – 31 December 2024); 2025 winter–spring offensives; (1 January 2025 – 31 May 2025); 2025 summer offensives; (1 June 2025 – 31 August 2025); 2025 autumn–winter offensives; (1 September 2025 – 31 December 2025); 2026 winter–spring offensives; (1 January 2026 – 31 May 2026); 2026 summer offensives; (1 June 2026 – 31 August 2026); 2026 autumn–winter offensives; (1 September 2026 – present)

- List of wars involving Ukraine - (830s–present)
- Chronology of Ukrainian language suppression actions - (1620–present) - Official measures restricting the use of the Ukrainian language.
- Historical regions in present-day Ukraine - Historic territories including Galicia, Volhynia, Podolia and Sloboda Ukraine.
- List of aviation shootdowns and accidents during the Russo-Ukrainian war - (2014–present)
- List of Black Sea incidents involving Russia and Ukraine - (1994–2019)
- List of Heroes of Ukraine - (1998–present) - Recipients of the country's highest state honor.
- List of invasions and occupations of Ukraine - (1450–present)
- List of massacres in Ukraine - (1240–present)
- List of military engagements during the 2022 Russian invasion of Ukraine - (2022–present)
- List of ship losses during the Russo-Ukrainian war - (2014–present)
- Outline of the Chernobyl disaster - (1986–present) - Structured index of topics relating to the accident.

==== Timelines ====
- Timeline of the Russian annexation of Crimea - (2014) - Chronology of the Russian seizure and annexation of Crimea.
- Timeline of the war in Donbas - (2014–2022) - Chronology of the fighting in the east before the full-scale invasion.
- Timeline of the prelude to the Russian invasion of Ukraine - (2021–2022) - Chronology of the military buildup and diplomatic crisis before the invasion.
- Timeline of the Russo-Ukrainian war (2022–present) - (2022–present) - Index to the periodized timelines of the full-scale war.

=== Historiography of Ukraine ===
- Holodomor genocide question - (1932–1933) - Debate over whether the famine amounted to genocide.
- Historiography of the massacres of Poles in Volhynia and Eastern Galicia - (1943–1945) - Historiographical debate over the massacres of Poles.

==== Works about Ukrainian history ====
- Bibliography of Ukrainian history

==== History books ====
- Internationalism or Russification? - (1965) - Book by Ivan Dziuba attacking Soviet nationality policy.
- East West Street - (2016) - Book by Philippe Sands on Hersch Lauterpacht, Raphael Lemkin and the origins of genocide and crimes against humanity.
- Handbook on the history of Ukraine - Multi-volume encyclopedic reference on Ukrainian history.
- History of Ukraine-Rusʹ - (1895–1933) - Ten-volume monographic series by Mykhailo Hrushevsky, covering antiquity to the later 17th century.
- Kyiv: An Encyclopedic Handbook - (1981) - First universal encyclopedic reference work on Kyiv.
- Makhno and Memory - (2020) - Study by Sean Patterson of competing Makhnovist and Mennonite narratives of the civil war.
- Sketches from a Secret War - (2005) - Book by Timothy Snyder on interwar Poland and Soviet Ukraine through the life of Henryk Józewski.
- The Anarchism of Nestor Makhno, 1918–1921 - (1976) - Study of Nestor Makhno by Michael Palij.
- The Lemberg Mosaic - Account of the destruction of Jewish Lemberg by Jakob Weiss, built around two survivors' memoirs.
- Ukraine: A History - (1988) - Survey of Ukrainian history by Orest Subtelny.

==== Books about the Holodomor ====
- Bloodlands - (2010) - Book by Timothy Snyder.
- The Harvest of Sorrow - (1986) - Book by Robert Conquest.
- Holodomor: The Unknown Ukrainian Tragedy (1932–1933) - (2013) - Book coordinated by José Eduardo Franco and Beata Cieszynska.
- Red Famine - (2017) - Book by Anne Applebaum.

==== Primary sources ====
- Hypatian Codex - Manuscript.
- Brief Description of Little Russia - (1730s) - Ukrainian chronicle by an anonymous author.
- Chernihiv Chronicle - (17th century–18th century) - Work of Cossack chronicle writing.
- Chronicle of the Grand Duchy of Lithuania, Ruthenia and Samogitia - (1520s) - Second redaction of the Belarusian–Lithuanian Chronicles, written in Ruthenian among the aristocracy of Vilnius.
- Description of Ukraine - (1651) - Account of Ukraine by the French engineer and cartographer Guillaume Le Vasseur de Beauplan, who served Władysław IV Vasa.
- Eyewitness Chronicle - (17th century) - One of the three Cossack chronicles and a fundamental source on the Khmelnytsky Uprising and The Ruin.
- History of the Ruthenians - (c. 1800) - Anonymous historico-political treatise that shaped Ukrainian national identity.
- The History of the Zaporizhian Cossacks (Myshetsky) - (18th century) - Account of the Sich and the Zaporozhian Cossacks.
- Hrabianka Chronicle - (17th century–18th century) - Cossack chronicle compiled by polkovnyk Hryhorii Hrabianka of the Hadiach Regiment.
- Huklyv Chronicle - (1660–c. 1812) - Transcarpathian chronicle written in a wooden church near the village of Huklyvyi.
- Hustyn Chronicle - (17th century) - Church Slavonic chronicle of Ukrainian history to 1598.
- Kresowa księga sprawiedliwych - Collection of testimony on Ukrainians who sheltered Poles during the massacres in Volhynia, published by the Institute of National Remembrance.
- Novhorod-Siverskyi Chronicle - (18th century) - Landmark of Ukrainian historical thought covering the years 706 to 1760.
- Praise to Vytautas - (15th century) - Panegyric to Vytautas the Great and an early work of Ruthenian secular prose.
- Samiilo Velychko Chronicle - (c. 1720) - Cossack chronicle of the years 1620 to 1700 by the clerk Samiilo Velychko.
- Volyn Short Chronicle - (16th century) - Lithuanian chronicle in Ruthenian, part of the Supraśl Manuscript.

== See also ==
- Bibliography of the Holodomor
- Outline of the Russian Revolution and Civil War
- Outline of the Polish-Soviet War
- Bibliography of the Soviet Union
- Bibliography of Russian history
