= Anthem of the Ukrainian Soviet Socialist Republic =

Derzhavnyy himn Ukrayins'koyi Radyans'koyi Sotsialistychnoyi Respubliky
English: State Anthem of the USSR
- Державний гімн Української Радянської Соціалістичної Республіки (Ukrainian); Государственный гимн Украинской Советской Социалистической Республики (Russian)
- Former regional anthem of the Ukrainian SSR Former national anthem of Ukraine (Note: Without lyrics.)
- Lyrics: Pavlo Tychyna (original); Mykola Bazhan (updated)
- Music: Anton Dmytrovych Lebedynetz, 1949
- Adopted: 1949 (original lyrics); 1978 (revised lyrics)
- Readopted: 1991 (without words)
- Relinquished: 1991 (with lyrics); 1992 (music only)
- Preceded by: State Anthem of Ukraine
- Succeeded by: State Anthem of Ukraine

Audio sample
- Instrumental recording: file; help

1949 recording

Full vocal version

Vocal version (2 verses)

The State Anthem of the Ukrainian SSR (Note: Ukrainian: Державний гімн Української Радянської Соціалістичної Республіки, romanized: Derzhavnyy himn Ukrayins'koyi Radyans'koyi Sotsialistychnoyi Respubliky, IPA: [derˈʒɑu̯nɪj ˈɦimn ʊkrɐˈjinʲsʲkoji rɐˈdʲɑnʲsʲkoji sots⁽ʲ⁾iɐl⁽ʲ⁾iˈstɪtʃnoji reˈspubl⁽ʲ⁾ikɪ].) was the Soviet republican anthem of the Ukrainian Soviet Socialist Republic, one of the republics of the Soviet Union.

It has been banned in Ukraine since 2015 due to decommunization laws.

The same melody was used for the anthem of Novorossiya, a self-proclaimed unrecognized confederation in southeastern Ukraine, entitled "Live, New Russia!" (Russian: Живи, Новороссия!"). The song is sung in both Russian and Ukrainian, with the first and third stanzas sung in Russian and the second stanza in Ukrainian.

== Background ==
The Ukrainian People's Republic had instituted "Shche ne vmerla Ukrainy i slava, i volia" as its anthem in 1917. It was banned when the Russian and Ukrainian Bolsheviks took control of Ukraine in 1920 and created the USSR in 1922. But they did not see any need for a Ukrainian anthem until the 1940s.

The idea of creating the anthem arose in context with introduction of the Ukrainian SSR to the United Nations organization, the creation of which was discussed at the 1943 Teheran Conference. In order to receive extra votes in the United Nations, Stalin came up with the idea to add two union republics – Ukraine and Belarus – which had to be portrayed as fully sovereign republics. In relation to that about a month later on 28 January – 1 February 1944 in Moscow was convened the 10th session of the Supreme Soviet of the Soviet Union which adapted laws about creation of key people's commissariats (ministries) in union republics such as defense and foreign affairs. Already on 3 February 1944 the Presidium of the Supreme Soviet issued its Ukase "About state anthems of Soviet republics", according to which all union republics were obligated to adopt own anthems.

In spring of 1944 in Kiev was established a commission in preparation of anthem draft, which was headed by director of the Agitation and Propaganda section of the Central Committee of the Communist Party of Ukraine Konstantin Litvin. (Note: According to the Handbook on history of the Communist Party and the Soviet Union 1898–1991, Konstantin Litvin at the time was a deputy director of the section and became a director on 6 October 1944.) The Ukrainian poets who participated in contest were given quite responsible and "delicate" task to create such "main song of Ukraine" that in all and completely would "fit" into the politically ideological context of the All-Union anthem ("State Anthem of the Soviet Union") and at the same time reflect the Ukrainian national characteristics.

The leitmotif or motto-theme of practically all variants of the Ukrainian anthem lyrics submitted at the contest became glorification of the "older brother – the Great Russian people" (Note: A dated term for the today's Russians in the Russian Empire (until early 20th century) was Great Russian people, while Ukrainians were known as Little Russian people, and Belarusians were known as White Russian people.) and the "leader of all nations Joseph Stalin". Among such variants were examples that began with the following leading lines:

- "In fraternal unity of Slavic nations our first brother is the people of Russia"
- "Russia is our freedom and glory that united our nation and our land bloomed"
- "Be glorious in the heart of Ukraine, the great friend, our Russian brother"

The authors were offering to implement into the anthem lines that would call Ukrainians "to live under the sun of the Kremlin and Moscow", "follow the freedom road under the stars of friendship, the stars of Moscow", (Note: The main element of the Mossovet emblem is a big red star.) to glorify "in the heart of Ukraine, the great friend, our Russian brother" and so on. In regards to Joseph Stalin, the creative fantasy of anthem writers had no limits indeed. Stalin was named as the Sun, the Dawn, the Father of Ukraine (e.g. "Two suns you have one in the Kremlin, another burns in the blue sky"). There were numerous versions that were submitted, but never adopted during the still ongoing war. Finally in 1949 due to certain awkwardness in the United Nations, there arose the issue to make changes to the Ukrainian state symbols, so there was finally adopted the new State Emblem and State Flag of the Ukrainian SSR.

The authors of lyrics of the State Anthem of the Ukrainian SSR became prominent Soviet Ukrainian poets Pavlo Tychyna and Mykola Bazhan, (Note: Both Tychyna and Bazhan were members of the All-Union Communist Party (Bolsheviks) and in 1952 were admitted to the Central Committee of the Communist Party of Ukraine.) while the music was written by a creative team led by Soviet composer Anton Lebedynets. The text body of the "main Ukrainian patriotic song", completely "fitted" into the ideological context of the All-Union anthem by glorifying the Soviet Union, in which the united Ukraine "found its happiness", "as a flower has blossomed", the Russian people who "in struggle for the fate of our nation was always our friend and brother", as well as the leaders like Lenin who "illuminated us the path to freedom" and Stalin who "leads us to the illustrious heights".

When Stalin died in 1953, during the process of de-Stalinization, the State Anthems were muted by Nikita Khrushchev along with the Ukrainian SSR. In 1977, the Soviet Union adopted a new constitution and lyrics of the National Anthem, all its Socialist Republics followed the same path.

The fact that in the Soviet Ukrainian anthem the manifestation of national patriotic sentiments was transmitted through demonstration of loyalty to another nation undoubtedly could be considered the most fascinating paradox of the Soviet Ukrainian authorship of anthem. However that paradox was completely natural as the anthem of the UkrSSR was a real visiting card of the Ukrainian Soviet puppet statehood. Such it remained and after the implemented respective corrections in it in 1958 following the All-Union parenting model.

The music was composed by Anton Dmytrovych Lebedynets, and the words were written by Pavlo Tychyna. In 1958, the second stanza of the lyrics was changed by Mykola Bazhan to remove mentions of Joseph Stalin; the new third stanza omitted reference to the “people’s sword of righteous anger” and added a new reference to “Lenin’s party” (the Communist Party of the Soviet Union) while retaining the one to communism itself. The anthem of the USSR was also played during nearly all official events in Ukraine.

On 15 January 1992, the Presidium of Verkhovna Rada issue a ukase stating that the anthem of the Ukrainian Soviet Socialist Republic would lose its status and, starting on 16 January 1992, be replaced with the earlier anthem "Shche ne vmerla Ukrainy i slava, i volia".

In 2002 there was an attempt to reintroduce the Ukrainian Soviet anthem with a changed text edited by Mykhailo Tush. Previously, the Soviet anthems were already revived in the Russian Federation and Belarus. Another attempt took place in 2010, in which the Luhansk wing of the Communist Party of Ukraine held a competition for new lyrics, which was won by Igor Ortsev from Luhansk.

Since 2015, performance of this song is prohibited in Ukraine and offenders may be subject to up to five years of imprisonment for "Propaganda of the Soviet totalitarian symbols". It is used, like other pieces of nostalgia to the Soviet Union, by collaborators in Russian-held areas in southeastern parts of the country.

== Lyrics ==
=== Original version (1949–1978) ===
Ukrainian original

I
Живи, Україно, прекрасна і сильна,
В Радянськім Союзі ти щастя знайшла.
Між рівними рівна, між вільними вільна,
Під сонцем свободи, як цвіт, розцвіла.

Приспів:
Слава Союзу Радянському, слава!
Слава Вітчизні народів-братів!
Живи, Україно, радянська державо,
Возз’єднаний краю на віки-віків!

II
Нам завжди у битвах за долю народу
Був другом і братом російський народ,
І Ленін осяяв нам путь на свободу,
І Сталін веде нас до світлих висот.

Приспів

III
Розіб’ємо всі ми ворожі навали
Народного гніву священним мечем!
Під стягом радянським ми дужими стали
І в світ Комунізму велично ідем!

Приспів

Ukrainian Latin alphabet

I
Žyvy, Ukrajino, prekrasna i syľna,
V Radjanśkim Sojuzi ty ščastja znajšla.
Miž rivnymy rivna, miž viľnymy viľna,
Pid soncem svobody, jak cvit, rozcvila.

Prispiv:
Slava Sojuzu Radjaśkomu, slava!
Slava Vitčyzni narodiv-brativ!
Žyvy, Ukrajino, radjanśka deržavo,
Vozzjednanyj kraju na viky-vikiv!

II
Nam zavždy u bytvach za dolju narodu
Buv druhom i bratom rosijśkyj narod,
I Lenin osjajav nam puť na svobodu,
I Stalin vede nas do svitlych vysot.

Prispiv

III
Rozib'jemo vsi my voroži navaly
Narodnoho hnivu svjaščennym mečem!
Pid stjahom radjanśkym my dužymy staly
I v svit Komunizmu velyčno idem!

Prispiv

IPA transcription (Note: See Help:IPA/Ukrainian and Ukrainian phonology.)

1
[ʒɪ.ˈvɪ | ʊ.krɐ.ˈji.no | pre.ˈkrɑs.nɐ i ˈsɪlʲ.nɐ |]
[u̯‿rɐ.ˈdʲɑn.s⁽ʲ⁾k⁽ʲ⁾im so.ˈju.z⁽ʲ⁾i tɪ ˈʃt͡ʃɑs.ʲtʲɐ znɐjʃ.ˈɫɑ ‖]
[m⁽ʲ⁾iʒ ˈr⁽ʲ⁾iu̯.nɪ.mɪ ˈr⁽ʲ⁾iu̯.nɐ | m⁽ʲ⁾iʒ ˈʋ⁽ʲ⁾ilʲ.nɪ.mɪ ˈʋ⁽ʲ⁾ilʲ.nɐ |]
[p⁽ʲ⁾id ˈsɔn.t͡sem swo.ˈbɔ.dɪ | jɑk t͡s⁽ʲ⁾ʋ⁽ʲ⁾it | roz.t͡s⁽ʲ⁾ʋ⁽ʲ⁾i.ˈɫɑ ‖]

[ˈprɪs⁽ʲ⁾.p⁽ʲ⁾iu̯]:
[ˈsɫɑ.ʋɐ so.ˈju.zʊ rɐ.ˈdʲɑn.ʲsʲko.mʊ | ˈsɫɑ.ʋɐ ‖]
[ˈsɫɑ.ʋɐ ʋ⁽ʲ⁾it.ˈt͡ʃɪz⁽ʲ⁾.n⁽ʲ⁾i nɐ.ˈrɔ.d⁽ʲ⁾iu̯ brɐ.ˈt⁽ʲ⁾iu̯‖]
[ʒɪ.ˈvɪ | ʊ.krɐ.ˈji.no | rɐ.ˈdʲɑnʲ.sʲkɐ der.ˈʒɑ.wo |]
[woz.ˈzjɛd.nɐ.nɪj ˈkrɑ.jʊ nɑ ʋ⁽ʲ⁾i.ˈkɪ ʋ⁽ʲ⁾i.ˈk⁽ʲ⁾iu̯ ‖]

2
[nɑm ˈzɑu̯ʒ.dɪ u ˈbɪt.ʋɐx zɑ ˈdɔ.lʲʊ nɐ.ˈrɔ.dʊ]
[buu̯ ˈdru.ɦom i ˈbrɑ.tom ro.ˈs⁽ʲ⁾ij.sʲkɪj nɐ.ˈrɔd |]
[i ˈɫɛ.n⁽ʲ⁾in o.ˈsʲɑ.jɐu̯ nɑm putʲ nɑ swo.ˈbɔ.dɐ |]
[i ˈstɑ.l⁽ʲ⁾in ʋe.ˈdɛ nɑs dɔ ˈs⁽ʲ⁾ʋ⁽ʲ⁾it.ɫɪx ʋɪ.ˈsɔt ‖]

[ˈprɪs⁽ʲ⁾.p⁽ʲ⁾iu̯]

3
[ro.ˈz⁽ʲ⁾i.bʲje.mo u̯s⁽ʲ⁾i mɪ wo.ˈrɔ.ʒ⁽ʲ⁾i nɐ.ˈʋɑ.ɫɪ]
[nɐ.ˈrɔd.no.ɦo ˈɦn⁽ʲ⁾i.wʊ sʲʋʲɐʃ.ˈt͡ʃɛn.nɪm me.ˈt͡ʃɛm ‖]
[p⁽ʲ⁾id ˈsʲtʲɑ.ɦom rɐ.ˈdʲɑnʲ.sʲkɪm mɪ ˈdu.ʒɪ.mɪ ˈstɑ.ɫɪ]
[i u̯‿s⁽ʲ⁾ʋ⁽ʲ⁾it ko.mʊ.ˈn⁽ʲ⁾iz.mʊ ʋe.ˈɫɪt͡ʃ.no i.ˈdɛm ‖]

[ˈprɪs⁽ʲ⁾.p⁽ʲ⁾iu̯]

English translation

I
Live, Ukraine, beautiful and strong,
You found happiness in the Soviet Union.
Equal amid the equal, free amid the free,
Under the sun of freedom, you bloomed like a flower.

Chorus:
Glory to the Soviet Union, glory!
Glory to the Fatherland of brotherly nations!
Live, Ukraine, a Soviet nation,
As a reunited country forever and ever!

II
Always in a battle for the fate of the people,
The Russian people were our brothers and friends.
And Lenin illuminated our path to freedom,
And Stalin leadeth us to bright heights.

Chorus

III
Our foes’ forays we shall expunge
With the sacred sword of our people's rage!
Under the Soviet flag potent, we’ve become,
And loyal we go in the world of Communism!

Chorus

=== 1978–1991 version ===
Ukrainian original

I
Живи, Україно, прекрасна і сильна,
В Радянськім Союзі ти щастя знайшла.
Між рівними рівна, між вільними вільна,
Під сонцем свободи, як цвіт розцвіла.

Приспів:
Слава Союзу Радянському, слава!
Слава Вітчизні на віки-віків!
Живи Україно, радянська державо,
В єдиній родині народів-братів!

II
Нам завжди у битвах за долю народу
Був другом і братом російський народ,
Нас Ленін повів переможним походом
Під прапором Жовтня до світлих висот.

Приспів

III
Ми славим трудом Батьківщину могутню,
Утверджуєм правду безсмертних ідей.
У світ комунізму – величне майбутнє
Нас Ленінська партія мудро веде.

Приспів

Ukrainian Latin alphabet

I
Zhyvy, Ukrayino, prekrasna i syl'na,
V Radyans'kim Soyuzi ty shchastya znayshla.
Mizh rivnymy rivna, mizh vil'nymy vil'na,
Pid sontsem svobody, yak tsvit roztsvila.

Pryspiv:
Slava Soyuzu Radyans'komu, slava!
Slava Vitchyzni na viky-vikiv!
Zhyvy, Ukrayino, radyans'ka derzhavo,
V yedyniy rodyni narodiv-brativ!

II
Nam zavzhdy u bytvach za dolyu narodu
Buv druhom i bratom rosiys'kyy narod.
Nas Lenin poviv peremozhnym pokhodom
Pid praporom Zhovtnya do svitlykh vysot.

Pryspiv

III
My slavym trudom bat'kivshchynu mohutnyu,
Utverdzhuyem pravdu bezsmertnykh idey.
U svit komunizmu – velychne maybutnye
Nas Lenins'ka partiya mudro vede.

Pryspiv

IPA transcription

1
[ʒɪ.ˈvɪ | ʊ.krɐ.ˈji.no | pre.ˈkrɑs.nɐ i ˈsɪlʲ.nɐ |]
[u̯‿rɐ.ˈdʲɑn.s⁽ʲ⁾k⁽ʲ⁾im so.ˈju.z⁽ʲ⁾i tɪ ˈʃt͡ʃɑs.ʲtʲɐ znɐjʃ.ˈɫɑ ‖]
[m⁽ʲ⁾iʒ ˈr⁽ʲ⁾iu̯.nɪ.mɪ ˈr⁽ʲ⁾iu̯.nɐ | m⁽ʲ⁾iʒ ˈʋ⁽ʲ⁾ilʲ.nɪ.mɪ ˈʋ⁽ʲ⁾ilʲ.nɐ |]
[p⁽ʲ⁾id ˈsɔn.t͡sem swo.ˈbɔ.dɪ | jɑk t͡s⁽ʲ⁾ʋ⁽ʲ⁾it roz.t͡s⁽ʲ⁾ʋ⁽ʲ⁾i.ˈɫɑ ‖]

[ˈprɪs⁽ʲ⁾.p⁽ʲ⁾iu̯]:
[ˈsɫɑ.ʋɐ so.ˈju.zʊ rɐ.ˈdʲɑn.ʲsʲko.mʊ | ˈsɫɑ.ʋɐ ‖]
[ˈsɫɑ.ʋɐ ʋ⁽ʲ⁾it.ˈt͡ʃɪz⁽ʲ⁾.n⁽ʲ⁾i nɑ ʋ⁽ʲ⁾i.ˈkɪ ʋ⁽ʲ⁾i.ˈk⁽ʲ⁾iu̯ ‖]
[ʒɪ.ˈvɪ ʊ.krɐ.ˈji.no | rɐ.ˈdʲɑnʲ.sʲkɐ der.ˈʒɑ.wo |]
[ʋ‿je.ˈdɪ.n⁽ʲ⁾ij ro.ˈdɪ.n⁽ʲ⁾i nɐ.ˈrɔ.d⁽ʲ⁾iu̯ brɐ.ˈt⁽ʲ⁾iu̯ ‖]

2
[nɑm ˈzɑu̯ʒ.dɪ u ˈbɪt.ʋɐx zɑ ˈdɔ.lʲʊ nɐ.ˈrɔ.dʊ]
[buu̯ ˈdru.ɦom i ˈbrɑ.tom ro.ˈs⁽ʲ⁾ij.sʲkɪj nɐ.ˈrɔd |]
[nɑs ˈɫɛ.n⁽ʲ⁾in po.ˈʋ⁽ʲ⁾iu̯ pe.re.ˈmɔʒ.nɪm po.ˈxɔ.dom |]
[p⁽ʲ⁾id ˈprɑ.po.rom ˈʒɔu̯tʲ.nʲɐ dɔ ˈs⁽ʲ⁾ʋ⁽ʲ⁾it.ɫɪx ʋɪ.ˈsɔt ‖]

[ˈprɪs⁽ʲ⁾.p⁽ʲ⁾iu̯]

3
[mɪ ˈsɫɑ.ʋɪm trʊ.ˈdɔm bɐt⁽ʲ⁾.k⁽ʲ⁾iu̯ʃ.ˈt͡ʃɪnʊ mo.ˈɦutʲ.nʲʊ]
[ʊt.ˈʋɛr.d͡ʒʊ.jem ˈprɑu̯.dʊ bez.ˈsmɛrt.nɪx i.ˈdɛj ‖]
[u s⁽ʲ⁾ʋ⁽ʲ⁾it ko.mʊ.ˈn⁽ʲ⁾iz.mʊ ʋe.ˈɫɪt͡ʃ.ne mɐj.ˈbutʲ.nʲe]
[nɑs ˈɫɛ.n⁽ʲ⁾inʲ.sʲkɐ ˈpɑr.t⁽ʲ⁾i.jɐ ˈmu.dro ʋe.ˈdɛ ‖]

[ˈprɪs⁽ʲ⁾.p⁽ʲ⁾iu̯]

English translation

I
Live, Ukraine, beautiful and strong,
You found happiness in the Soviet Union.
Equal amid the equal, free amid the free,
Under the sun of freedom, you bloomed like a flower.

Chorus:
Glory to the Soviet Union, glory!
Glory to the Fatherland forever and ever
Live, Ukraine, a Soviet nation,
In a united family of brotherly nations!

II
Always in a battle for the fate of the people,
The Russian people were our brothers and friends.
Lenin led us on a victorious campaign
Under the flag of October to brilliant heights.

Chorus

III
We glorify the mighty Fatherland through labor,
Affirming the truth of our immortal idea.
In the world of communism there is a great future,
The Party of Lenin leads us wisely!

Chorus

=== 2010 proposal ===
==== Ukrainian version ====
The following are the lyrics by Igor Ortsev chosen in the competition held by the Luhansk wing of the Communist Party of Ukraine in 2010.

Ukrainian original

I
Живи Україно, прекрасна і сильна,
На віки-віків нам на щастя дана.
З народної волі ти стала єдина,
Під сонцем свободи, як цвіт розцвіла.

Приспів:
Слава народу великому, слава!
Господарю долі на рідній землі!
Живи незалежно, могутня Державо,
Живи Україно, ми діти твої!

ІІ
Ми разом назавжди від Чорного моря,
До сивих Карпат та Донбаських степів.
І наші серця заповняє любов'ю,
Величність святого Дніпра берегів.

Приспів

III
Ми працею славимо нашу країну,
За честь і свободу, життя віддамо!
І віримо свято в свою Батьківщину,
Цю віру нащадкам ми передамо!

Приспів

Ukrainian Latin alphabet

I
Žyvy, Ukrajino, prekrasna i syľna
Na viky-vikiv nam na ščastja dana.
Z narodnoji voli ty stala jedyna,
Pid soncem svobody, jak cvit rozcvila.

Pryspiv:
Slava narodu velykomu, slava!
Hospodarju doli na ridnij zemli!
Žyvy nezaležno, mohutnja Deržavo,
Žyvy Ukrajino, my dity tvoï!

II
My razom nazavždy vid Čornoho morja,
Do syvych Karpat ta Donbaśkych stepiv.
I naši sercja zapovnjaje liubov'ju,
Velychnisť svjatoho Dnipra berehiv.

Pryspiv

III
My praceju slavymo našu kraïnu,
Za česť i svobodu, žyttja viddamo!
I virymo sviato v svoju Baťkivščynu,
Ciu viru naščadkam my peredamo!

Pryspiv

English translation

I
Live Ukraine, beautiful and strong,
Happiness has been given to us forever and ever.
From the people's will you became united,
Under the sun of freedom, you bloomed as a flower.

Chorus:
Glory to the great people, glory!
Master of destiny in his native land!
Live independently, mighty State,
Live, Ukraine, we are your children!

II
We are together forever from the Black Sea,
To the grey Carpathians and Donbas steppes.
And fills our hearts with love,
The majesty of the Holy Dnieper shores.

Chorus

III
We glorify our country with labour,
For honour and freedom, we will give our lives!
And we sacredly believe in our Homeland,
We will pass on this faith to our descendants!

Chorus

==== Russian version ====
The Communist Party of Ukraine has also released a version of the proposed anthem, in Russian.

Russian original

I
Живи, Украина, прекрасной и сильной,
На веки веков ты нам Богом дана.
По воле народа ты стала единой,
Под солнцем свободы, как цвет расцвела.

Припев:
Слава народу великому, слава!
Трудолюбивой и крепкой семье,
Живи Украина, родная держава,
В мире любви на мирной земле!

II
Мы долго шагали дорогой истории
К светлой мечте, счастью мирных людей!
Пусть наши сердца переполнит восторгом
Победа святых и бессмертных идей!

Припев

III
Мы славим трудом дорогую отчизну,
За честь и свободу ей жизнь посвятим!
Пусть путь нам укажет звезда гуманизма
И предков заветы, что в сердце храним!

Припев

Russian Latin alphabet

I
Živi, Ukraina, prekrasnoj i sil'noj
Na veki vekov ty nam Bogom dana.
Po vole naroda ty stala edinoj,
Pod solncem svobody, kak cvet rascvela.

Pripev:
Slava narodu velikomu, slava!
Trudoljubivnoj i krepkoj sem'e,
Živi, Ukraina, rodnaja deržava,
V mire ljubvi na mirnoj zemle!

II
My dolgo šagali dorogoj istorii
K svetloj mečte, sčast'ju mirnyh ljudej!
Pust' naši serdca perepolnit vostorgom
Pobeda svjatyh i bessmertnyh idej!

Pripev

III
My slavim trudom doroguju otčiznu,
Za čest' i svobodu jej žizn' posvjatim!
Pust' put' nam ukažet zvezda gumanizma
I predkov zavety, čto v serdce hranim!

Pripev

English translation

I
Live Ukraine, beautiful and strong,
Forever and ever you are given to us by God.
From the people's will you became united,
Under the sun of freedom, you bloomed as a flower.

Chorus:
Glory to the great people, glory!
A hardworking and strong family,
Live, Ukraine, our native country
In a world of love in a peaceful land!

II
We walked for a long time on the path of history
To a bright dream, the happiness of a peaceful people!
May our hearts be overflown with delight
By the victory of holy and immortal ideas!

Chorus

III
We glorify our dear homeland with labour,
For honour and freedom, we will devote our lives to her!
May the path be shown to us, by the star of humanism
And the ancestral covenants, that we keep in our hearts!

Chorus

== See also ==
- Emblem of the Ukrainian Soviet Socialist Republic
- Flag of the Ukrainian Soviet Socialist Republic
