= Investigations into the Chernobyl disaster =

Investigations into the Chernobyl nuclear accident

The Chernobyl disaster was a catastrophic nuclear disaster that occurred in the early hours of 26 April 1986, at the Chernobyl Nuclear Power Plant in Soviet Ukraine. The accident occurred when Reactor Number 4 exploded and destroyed most of the reactor building, spreading debris and radioactive material across the surrounding area, and over the following days and weeks, most of mainland Europe was contaminated with radionuclides that emitted dangerous amounts of ionizing radiation. To investigate the causes of the accident, the International Atomic Energy Agency (IAEA) used its organization, the International Nuclear Safety Advisory Group (INSAG).

== Investigations ==
The IAEA produced two significant reports on Chernobyl; INSAG-1 in 1986, and a revised report, INSAG-7 in 1992. In summary, according to INSAG-1, the main cause of the accident was the operators' actions, but according to INSAG-7, the main cause was the reactor's design. Both IAEA reports identified an inadequate "safety culture" (INSAG-1 coined the term) at all managerial and operational levels as a major underlying factor of different aspects of the accident. This was stated to be inherent not only in operations but also during design, engineering, construction, manufacture and regulation.

Views of the main causes were heavily lobbied by different groups, including the reactor's designers, power plant personnel, and the Soviet and Ukrainian governments. This was due to the uncertainty about the actual sequence of events and plant parameters. After INSAG-1, more information became available and there was more powerful computing for forensic simulations.

The INSAG-7 conclusion of major factors contributory to the accident was:

The Accident is now seen to have been the result of concurrence of the following major factors: specific physical characteristics of the reactor; specific design features of the reactor control elements; and the fact that the reactor was brought to a state not specified by procedures or investigated by an independent safety body. Most importantly, the physical characteristics of the reactor made possible its unstable behaviour.

=== INSAG-1 report (1986) ===
The first official Soviet explanation of the accident was given by Soviet scientists and engineers to representatives of IAEA member states and other international organisations at the first Post-Accident Review Meeting, held at the IAEA in Vienna, 25–29 August 1986. This explanation effectively placed the blame on the power plant operators. The IAEA INSAG-1 report followed shortly afterwards in September 1986, and on the whole also supported this view, based also on the information provided in discussions with the Soviet experts at the Vienna review meeting. In this view, the catastrophic accident was caused by gross violations of operating rules and regulations. For instance; "During preparation and testing of the turbine generator under run-down conditions using the auxiliary load, personnel disconnected a series of technical protection systems and breached the most important operational safety provisions for conducting a technical exercise."

It was stated that at the time of the accident the reactor was being operated with many key safety systems turned off, most notably the emergency core cooling system (ECCS), LAR (Local Automatic control system), and AZ (emergency power reduction system). Personnel had an insufficient understanding of technical procedures involved with the nuclear reactor, and knowingly ignored regulations to expedite the electrical test completion. Several procedural irregularities also helped to make the accident possible, one of which was insufficient communication between the safety officers and the operators in charge of the test.

It was held that the designers of the reactor considered this combination of events to be impossible and therefore did not allow for the creation of emergency protection systems capable of preventing the combination of events that led to the crisis, namely the intentional disabling of emergency protection equipment plus the violation of operating procedures. Thus the primary cause of the accident was the extremely improbable combination of rule infringement plus the operational routine allowed by the power station staff.

On the disconnection of safety systems, Valery Legasov said in 1987, "It was like airplane pilots experimenting with the engines in flight." In this analysis, the operators were blamed, but deficiencies in the reactor design and in the operating regulations that made the accident possible were set aside and mentioned only casually. This view was reflected in numerous publications and artistic works on the theme of the Chernobyl accident that appeared immediately after the accident and remained dominant in the public consciousness and in popular publications for a long time.

=== Soviet criminal trial (1987) ===
The trial took place from 7 to 30 July 1987 in a temporary courtroom set up in the House of Culture in the city of Chernobyl, Ukraine. Five plant employees (Anatoly S. Dyatlov, the former deputy chief engineer; Viktor P. Bryukhanov, the former plant director; Nikolai M. Fomin, the former chief engineer; Boris V. Rogozhin, the shift director of Reactor 4; and Aleksandr P. Kovalenko, the chief of Reactor 4); and Yuri A. Laushkin (Gosatomenergonadzor [USSR State Committee on Supervision of Safe Conduct of Work in Atomic Energy] inspector) were sentenced to ten, ten, ten, five, three, and two years respectively in labor camps. The families of Aleksandr Akimov, Leonid Toptunov and Valery Perevozchenko had received official letters, but prosecution against the employees had been terminated at their deaths.

Anatoly Dyatlov was found guilty "of criminal mismanagement of potentially explosive enterprises" and sentenced to ten years imprisonment—of which he would serve three—for the role that his oversight of the experiment played in the ensuing accident.

=== INSAG-7 report (1992) ===
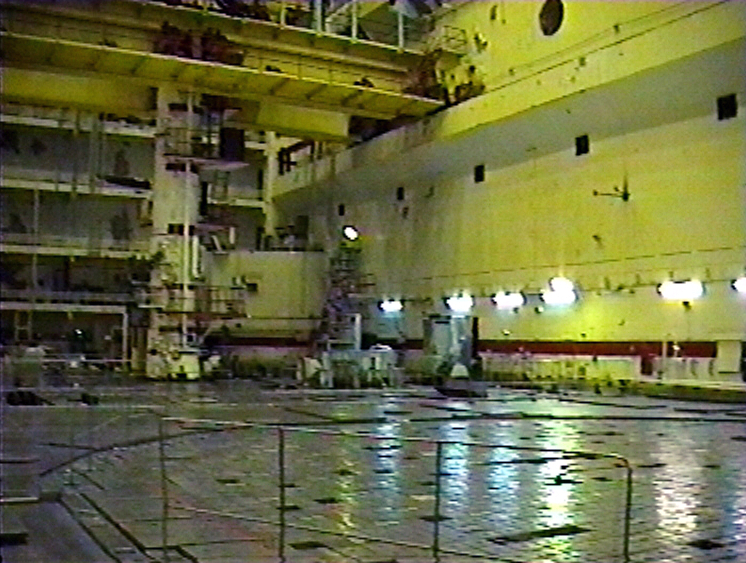
Reactor hall No. 1 of the Chernobyl Plant

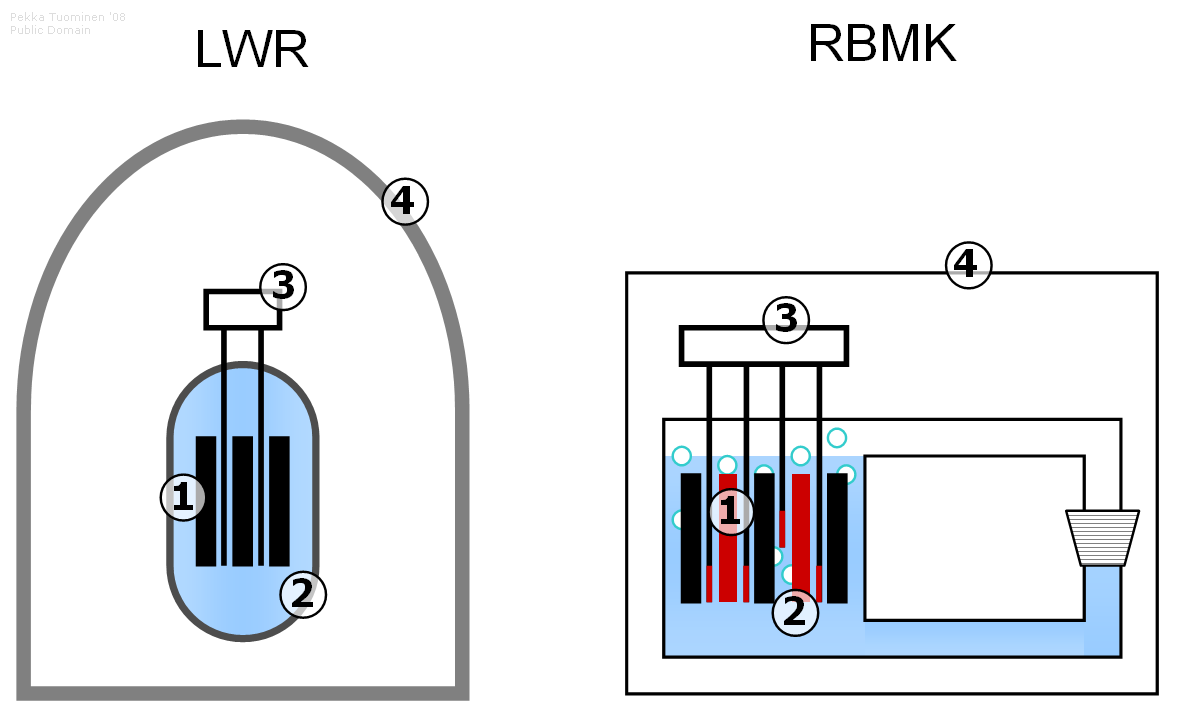
A simplified diagram comparing the Chernobyl RBMK and the most common nuclear reactor design, the Light water reactor. RBMK issues: 1. Using a graphite moderator in a water-cooled reactor, permitting criticality in a total loss of coolant accident. 2. A positive steam void coefficient that made the destructive power excursion possible. 3. Control rods design; taking 18–20 seconds to be fully inserted, and with graphite tips that increased reactivity initially. 4. No reinforced containment building.

In 1991, a Commission of the USSR State Committee for the Supervision of Safety in Industry and Nuclear Power reassessed the causes and circumstances of the Chernobyl accident and came to new insights and conclusions. Based on that, INSAG published an additional report, INSAG-7, which reviewed "that part of the INSAG-1 report in which primary attention is given to the reasons for the accident," and this included the text of the 1991 USSR State Commission report translated into English by the IAEA as Annex I.

By the time of this report, the post-Soviet Ukrainian government had declassified a number of KGB documents from the period between 1971 and 1988 related to the Chernobyl plant. It mentioned, for example, previous reports of structural damage caused by negligence during construction of the plant (such as splitting of concrete layers) that were never acted upon. They documented more than 29 emergency situations in the plant during this period, eight of which were caused by negligence or poor competence on the part of personnel.

In the INSAG-7 report, most of the earlier accusations against staff for breach of regulations were acknowledged to be either erroneous, being based on incorrect information obtained in August 1986, or were judged less relevant. The INSAG-7 report also reflected the view of the 1991 USSR State Commission account which held that the operators' actions in turning off the emergency core cooling system, interfering with the settings on the protection equipment, and blocking the level and pressure in the separator drum did not contribute to the original cause of the accident and its magnitude, although they may have been a breach of regulations. In fact, turning off the emergency system designed to prevent the two turbine generators from stopping was not a violation of regulations. Soviet authorities had identified a multitude of operator actions as regulation violations in the original 1986 report; no such regulations were in fact in place.

The primary design cause of the accident, as determined by INSAG-7, was a major deficiency in safety features, particularly the "positive scram" effect that was caused by the control rods' graphite tips that initially increased reactivity when control rods entered the core to try to reduce reactivity. There was also an overly positive void coefficient of the reactor, whereby steam-generated voids in the fuel cooling channels would increase reactivity because neutron absorption was reduced, resulting in more steam generation, and thereby more voids; a regenerative process.

The operators did not have the value of the reactor operational reactivity margin (ORM); they were also not aware of the safety significance of ORM on void and power coefficients. However, regulations did forbid operating the reactor with a small margin of reactivity. Yet "post-accident studies have shown that the way in which the real role of the ORM is reflected in the Operating Procedures and design documentation for the RBMK-1000 is extremely contradictory", and furthermore, "ORM was not treated as an operational safety limit, [a] violation of which could lead to an accident".

Even in this revised analysis, the human factor remained identified as a major factor in causing the accident, particularly the operating crew's deviation from the test programme; "unapproved changes in the test procedure were deliberately made on the spot, although the plant was known to be in a very different condition from that intended for the test." This included operating the reactor at a lower power level than the prescribed 700 MW before starting the electrical test. The 1986 assertions of Soviet experts notwithstanding, regulations did not prohibit operating the reactor at this low power level.

INSAG-7 also said, "The poor quality of operating procedures and instructions, and their conflicting character, put a heavy burden on the operating crew, including the chief engineer. The accident can be said to have flowed from a deficient safety culture, not only at the Chernobyl plant, but throughout the Soviet design, operating and regulatory organizations for nuclear power that existed at that time."

==== Positive void coefficient ====
The reactor had a dangerously large positive void coefficient of reactivity. The void coefficient is a measurement of how a reactor responds to increased steam formation in the water coolant. Most other reactor designs have a negative coefficient, i.e. the nuclear reaction rate slows when steam bubbles form in the coolant, since as the steam voids increase, fewer neutrons are slowed down. Faster neutrons are less likely to split uranium atoms, so the reactor produces less power (negative feedback effect).

Chernobyl's RBMK reactor, however, used solid graphite as a neutron moderator to slow down the neutrons, and the cooling water acted as a neutron absorber. Thus, neutrons are moderated by the graphite even if steam bubbles form in the water. Furthermore, because steam absorbs neutrons much less readily than water, increasing the voids means that more moderated neutrons are able to split uranium atoms, increasing the reactor's power output. This could create a positive feedback regenerative process (known as a positive power coefficient) which makes the RBMK design very unstable at low power levels, and prone to sudden energy surges to a dangerous level. Not only was this behaviour counter-intuitive, this property of the reactor under certain conditions was unknown to the personnel.

==== Control rod design ====
The reactor core was 7 metres (23 feet) high. The upper half of the rod 7 metres (23 feet) was boron carbide, which absorbs neutrons and thereby slows the reaction. The bottom section of each control rod was a 4.5 meter graphite displacer, which prevented the channels from filling with water when rods were withdrawn.

The flaw lay in the 1.25-metre (4.1-foot) gap between the bottom of the graphite displacer and the bottom of the reactor, meaning that the lowest portion of the control rod channel was filled with water, instead of graphite. With this design, when the rods were inserted from the fully retracted position to stop the reaction on the AZ-5 signal, the graphite displaced neutron-absorbing water, causing fewer neutrons to be absorbed and increasing reactivity. For the first 11 to 14 seconds of rod deployment until the boron was in position, reactor power across the floor of the reactor could increase rather than decrease. This feature of control rod operation was counter-intuitive and not known to the reactor operators.

==== Management and operational deficiencies ====
Other deficiencies were noted in the RBMK-1000 reactor design, as were its non-compliance with accepted standards and with the requirements of nuclear reactor safety. While INSAG-1 and INSAG-7 reports both identified operator error as an issue of concern, the INSAG-7 identified that there were numerous other issues that were contributing factors that led to the incident. These contributing factors include:

1. The plant was not designed to safety standards in effect and incorporated unsafe features
2. "Inadequate safety analysis" was performed
3. There was "insufficient attention to independent safety review"
4. "Operating procedures not founded satisfactorily in safety analysis"
5. Safety information not adequately and effectively communicated between operators, and between operators and designers
6. The operators did not adequately understand safety aspects of the plant
7. Operators did not sufficiently respect formal requirements of operational and test procedures
8. The regulatory regime was insufficient to effectively counter pressures for production
9. There was a "general lack of safety culture in nuclear matters at the national level as well as locally"

== See also ==
- List of Chernobyl-related articles
