= Orest Subtelny =

Ukrainian-Canadian academic

- Born: 17 May 1941; Kraków, Occupied Poland
- Died: 24 July 2016 (aged 75)
- Education: Temple University BA; University of North Carolina MA; Harvard University PhD
- Occupation: Historian
- Notable work: Ukraine: A History

Orest Subtelny (Ukrainian: О́рест Миросла́вович Субте́льний, 17 May 1941 – 24 July 2016) was a Ukrainian-Canadian historian.

Born in Kraków, Poland, he received his doctorate from Harvard University in 1973. From 1982 to 2015, he was a Professor in the Departments of History and Political Science at York University in Toronto.

== Early life ==
Orest Subtelny was born in Kraków, General Government, on 17 May 1941. His father, Myroslav, was a lawyer who had lived in the city in the mid-1930s and returned with his wife, Ivanna, in late August 1939 to take a government job. The following day, Germany invaded, forcing the family to return to Ukraine but Orest's mother returned to Kraków to give birth to her son because the city had a hospital.

The family spent World War II in western Ukraine, then fled the country after the arrival of the Soviet Army. Between 1945 and 1949 they were in a displaced persons camp in Germany before settling in the United States in Philadelphia as refugees.

== Education and teaching ==
Subtelny graduated from Temple University in 1965 where he earned a B.A. He received his M.A. from the University of North Carolina and PhD from Harvard University in 1973 in History and Middle East Studies. His dissertation was "Reluctant allies: Pylyp Orlyk and his relations with Crimean Khanate and Ottoman Empire, 1710–1742". His adviser was Oleksander Ohloblyn while his interpretation was influenced by Omeljan Pritsak.

Subtelny started his teaching career in the History Department of Harvard (1973-1975), later moving to the Hamilton College in New York (1975-1982). In 1982, he became Professor of History and Politics at York University in Toronto where he taught until his retirement in 2015.

== Career ==
Subtelny's major work is the general textbook Ukraine: A History (1988), a work of Ukrainian historiography. During the Mikhail Gorbachev reforms, the book was quickly translated into both Ukrainian and Russian and affected the growth of Ukrainian historical and national consciousness during the initial years of Ukrainian independence. In his history of Ukraine, Subtelny took a more traditional approach, like his predecessors Mykhailo Hrushevsky, Dmytro Doroshenko, and Ivan Krypiakevych, writing a national history, primarily the history of the Ukrainian people.

Subtelny's earlier work dealt with the Cossack era, especially the revolt of Hetman Ivan Mazepa against Tsar Peter the Great.

He authored six books on Eastern European and Ukrainian history, along with 55 articles and book chapters.

== Death ==
Subtelny died on 24 July 2016 at the age of 75 from cancer. The funeral was held at St. Demetrius Ukrainian Catholic Church; he was interred at Park Lawn Cemetery.

His death was widely reported in the Ukrainian diaspora and in Ukraine. Ukrainian President Petro Poroshenko released a statement which lauded Subtelny's contributions to Ukrainian history.

== Legacy ==
Taras Kuzio, a senior research fellow at the Canadian Institute of Ukrainian Studies, described Subtelny as having "made a truly enormous contribution to Ukrainian nation-building" whose "focus was on Ukrainian national identity, the struggle for independence and achieving statehood."

== Awards ==
- Antonovych Foundation Prize for the monograph: "The Mazepists: Ukrainian Separatism in the 18th century" (1983)
- Ukrainian Order of Merit (2001 & 2016)

In 1992, Subtelny was elected a foreign member of the National Academy of Sciences of Ukraine. He was awarded an Honorary Doctorate by the Diplomatic Academy of Ukraine. In Canada, he received the Shevchenko Medal by the Ukrainian Canadian Congress for his "outstanding contributions to the development of the Ukrainian Canadian community in the category of Education."

== Selected books and publications ==
- The Mazepists: Ukrainian Separatism in the Early Eighteenth Century (1981).
- The Domination of Eastern Europe, Foreign Absolutism and Native Nobilities (1986)
- Ukraine: A History (1988)
- Ukrainians in North America (1991)
- "Ukraine: The Imperial Heritage", Briefing Papers of the Canadian Bureau of International Studies (1996)
- "Cossacks", in The World Book Encyclopedia (1997)
- "Ukraine", in Encarta Encyclopedia (1997)
