= Emblem of the Ukrainian Soviet Socialist Republic =

- Armiger: Ukrainian Soviet Socialist Republic
- Adopted: 21 November 1949
- Crest: Red star
- Shield: Baroque shield with rising sun and hammer and sickle
- Supporters: Wheat
- Motto: Пролетарі всіх країн, єднайтеся! (Ukrainian); Пролетарии всех стран, соединяйтесь! (Russian); Workers of the world, unite! (English)
- Earlier version: See below

The emblem of the Ukrainian Soviet Socialist Republic was adopted on 14 March 1919 by the government of the Ukrainian Soviet Socialist Republic and subsequently modified on 7 November 1928, 30 January 1937 and 21 November 1949. The coat of arms from 1949 is based on the coat of arms of the Soviet Union and features the hammer and sickle and a sunrise in a cartouche (design) style shield, alongside the red star and stalks of wheat on its outer rims. The rising sun stands for the future of the Soviet Ukrainian nation, the red star as well as the hammer and sickle for communism and the "world-wide socialist community of states".

The banner bears the Soviet Union state motto "Workers of the world, unite!" in both the Ukrainian and Russian languages; in Ukrainian, it is Пролетарі всіх країн, єднайтеся! (Proletari vsich krain, jednajtesia!). The name of the Ukrainian SSR is shown only in Ukrainian, and reads "Українська PCP".

In 1992, after the dissolution of the Soviet Union and when Ukraine became independent, the emblem was changed to the present coat of arms of Ukraine the tryzub (trident) coat of arms, which was affirmed in the new Constitution of Ukraine in 1996, and was first proposed in 1917. The use of this former emblem is currently banned in modern-day Ukraine.

The emblem shares a common background with that of the Russian SFSR.

== History ==
=== First version ===
In the Constitution of the Ukrainian SSR, approved by the All-Ukrainian Congress of Soviets on 10 March 1919 and adopted in the final version of the CEC on 14 March 1919, the coat of arms was described in Article 34:

The coat of arms of the Ukrainian SSR consists of an image on a red background, in the rays of the sun, a golden sickle and a hammer, surrounded by a wreath of ears and inscribed in Russian and Ukrainian:

1) У.С.С.Р.

2) Workers of the world, unite!

— Constitution of the Ukrainian SSR (1919), Article 34

The section on the symbols of the republic in the Constitution of the Ukrainian SSR of 1919 was not amended even after the amendments to the Constitution of the Ukrainian SSR, which was adopted by the 9th All-Ukrainian Congress of Soviets on 10 May 1925.

==== First revision ====
Under the Article 80 of the Constitution of the Ukrainian SSR in 1929, the arms did not undergo significant changes. The abbreviation was changed from "У.С.С.Р." to "У.С.Р.Р.".

=== Second version ===
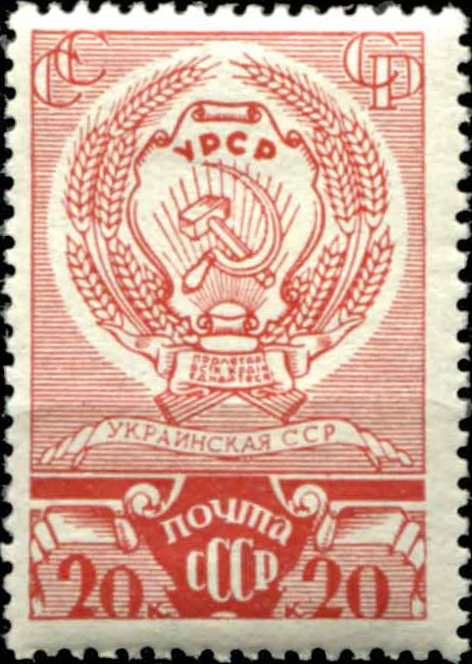
1937 postage stamp with the new arms

The Constitution of the Ukrainian SSR (1937), approved on 30 January 1937, slightly changed the coat of arms. The abbreviation changed from "У.С.Р.Р." to "У.Р.С.Р.", and the amount of the rays of sunlight increase.

=== Third version ===
In the summer of 1947, the Central Committee of the Communist Party (Bolsheviks) (the Communist Party of Ukraine) discussed the question of bringing the coat of arms of the Ukrainian Soviet Socialist Republic to the standard in the USSR: the top was decided to add a star, change the location of the inscriptions.

==== Correspondence with Moscow and Stalin ====
On 1 December 1947, to consult with the design of the coat of arms, Mykhailo Hrechukha, who was the Chairman of Presidium of Verkhovna Rada at the current time, send a letter to Demyan Korotchenko, who was the head of state of the Ukrainian SSR. He concerned about the design of the coat of arms of the Ukrainian SSR at that time, which only consists of the motto in Ukrainian language.

Secretary of the Central Executive Committee of the Communist Party of Ukraine

Comrade Demyan Korotchenko

In most of the Union Soviet republics on the state arms, the words "Workers of all countries, unite!" are inscribed in two languages - Russian language and their national language.

With the purpose of bringing the coat of arms of the Ukrainian SSR into line with the arms of the majority of the Union republics, we have drafted all the changes in the outline of the coat of arms of the Ukrainian SSR, which is submitted to you for consideration.

01 December 1947

Mykhailo Hrechukha

After that, Korotchenko and Hrechukha continued the letter to Lazar Kaganovich, who was the First Secretary of the Communist Party of Ukraine (Bolsheviks).

Secretary of the Central Executive Committee of the Communist Party of Ukraine

Comrade Lazar Kaganovich

On 17 July this year, The Politburo of the Central Committee of the Communist Party (Bolshevik), considering the question "On Amendments to the Image of the State Emblem of the Ukrainian SSR", decided to add to the image of the coat of arms of the Ukrainian SSR at the top of it, between the ears, a five-pointed star, as the emblem of the USSR.

In the process of implementing this decision, it became necessary to bring the State Emblem of the Ukrainian SSR into line with the arms of the majority of the Union republics, in which the words "Proletarians of all countries!" Were inscribed in two languages - Russian and the corresponding national language.

Represents to you two versions of the draft of the State Emblem of the Ukrainian SSR, developed by us, with all the changes and additions, and also the draft resolution of the Central Committee of the Communist Party (Bolshevik).

Demyan Korotchenko

Mykhailo Hrechukha

In an official correspondence, Kaganovich, together with V. Nyzhnyk, the Chairman of the Presidium of the Supreme Soviet of the Ukrainian SSR, continue to discuss this matter with Nikolay Shvernik, who was the Chairman of the Presidium of the Supreme Soviet of the USSR at that time. Kaganovich and Nyzhnyk send a correspondence to Shvernik at 3 January 1948.

No.04/S 3.1.48

Chairman of the Presidium of the Supreme Soviet of the USSR Comrade Nikolay Shvernik

In the modification of our letter of 23 December 1947 on H115/S, about the State Emblem of the Ukrainian SSR, we are sending you a graphic depiction of the State Emblem of the Ukrainian SSR with the changes introduced to it, as well as the draft decree of the Presidium of the Supreme Soviet of the Ukrainian SSR "On Amending the Image State Emblem of the Ukrainian SSR". Chairman of the Presidium of the Supreme Soviet of the Ukrainian SSR Mykhailo Hrechukha

Secretary of the Presidium of the Ukrainian SSR V. Nyzhnyk

On 14 January 1948, Hrechukha received a reply from Shvernik from his letter.

Comrade Mykhailo Hrechukha

According to the draft you submitted to the State Emblem of the Ukrainian SSR of our country, there are no comments.

The Draft Decree of the Presidium of the Supreme Council of the Ukrainian SSR on this issue is necessary to supplement with two paragraphs of the following content: 1. To approve the description of the State Emblem of the Ukrainian Soviet Socialist Republic. 2. To submit to the approval of the Supreme Council of the Ukrainian Soviet Socialist Republic a proposal for a corresponding amendment and addition of Article 124 of the Constitution of the Ukrainian Soviet Socialist Republic.

Before the adoption of the Soviet decision to change the image of the State Emblem of the Ukrainian SSR, the issue should be considered in the Central Committee of the Communist Party (Bolsheviks) of Ukraine, after which it should be submitted to the Central Committee of the CP(b)SU for approval.

Nikolay Shvernik

14 January 1948

After the changes were done, the result was given to Nikita Khrushchev, who was the First Secretary of the Communist Party of Ukraine (Bolsheviks). Then, he send the result of the discussion to Joseph Stalin.

Moscow, the Central Committee of the CP(b)SU

Comrade Joseph Stalin

The State Emblem of the Ukrainian SSR, established at the beginning of the Ukrainian SSR, does not fully reflect the emblem of the USSR. There is no red star in it, the words "Workers of the world, unite!" are written only in Ukrainian, and the Ukrainian SSR's alphabetic designation is abbreviated as "УССР".

In order to bring the coat of arms of the Ukrainian SSR in accordance with the position of the Union Republic in full conformity with the union republics coat of arms, the following should be introduced into the coat of arms of the Ukrainian SSR: 1. Put the five-pointed star, on top of the coat of arms between the ends of the wreath, and symbolizes the emblem of the USSR. 2. Put on the sides of the coat of arms on the branch one turn from the red tape, as a continuation of the tape. On which to write on the right coil "Пролетарии всех стран, соединяйтесь!", And on the left "Пролетарi усiх країн, єднайтеся!" 3. To remove the lettering inscriptions of the Ukrainian SSR on the top of the emblem and inscribe the inscription with the name of the republic on the red tape with the words "Українська PCP".

I present you with a graphic depiction of the State Emblem of the Ukrainian SSR after all the changes introduced.

Please approve

N. Khrushchev

==== Approval ====
By the decree of the Presidium of the Supreme Soviet of the Ukrainian SSR of 21 November 1949 and by the law adopted by the Supreme Soviet of the Ukrainian SSR on 5 July 1950, a red five-pointed star was added at the top of the Ukrainian SSR's coat of arms, and also the motto, the name of the republic in Ukrainian, and the motto in Ukrainian and Russian language is transferred to the lateral coils of the red tape.

In the Constitution of the Ukrainian SSR, the coat of arms was described in Article 166:

The State Emblem of the Ukrainian Soviet Socialist Republic is an image of a sickle and a hammer, placed on a shield in the rays of the sun and framed by crows, with an inscription on the ribbon: at the bottom of the wreath - "Ukrainian SSR", on the right turn - "Пролетарии всех стран, соединяйтесь!", on the left - "Пролетарi всiх країн, еднайтеся!". Above the shield between the ears is a five-pointed star.

— Constitution of the Ukrainian SSR (1989), Article 166

== Gallery ==
Coat of arms of the Ukrainian Soviet Socialist Republic (1918)

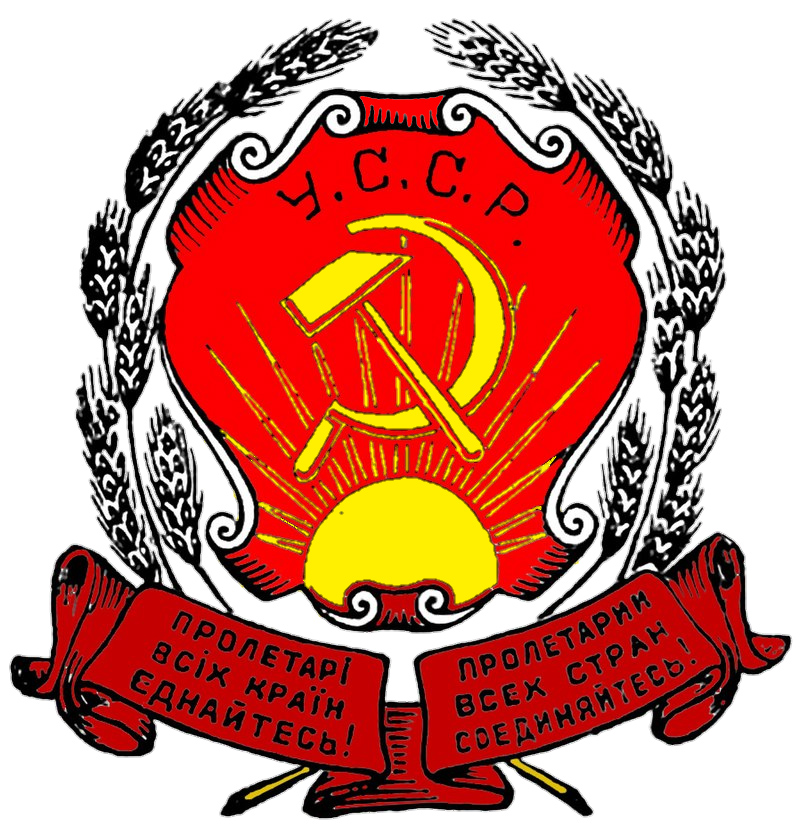
Coat of arms of the Ukrainian SSR (1919)

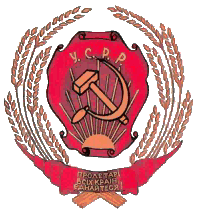
Emblem of the Ukrainian SSR (1929–1937)

Emblem of the Ukrainian SSR (1937–1949)

Emblem of the Ukrainian SSR (1949–1991) and of Ukraine (1991–1992)

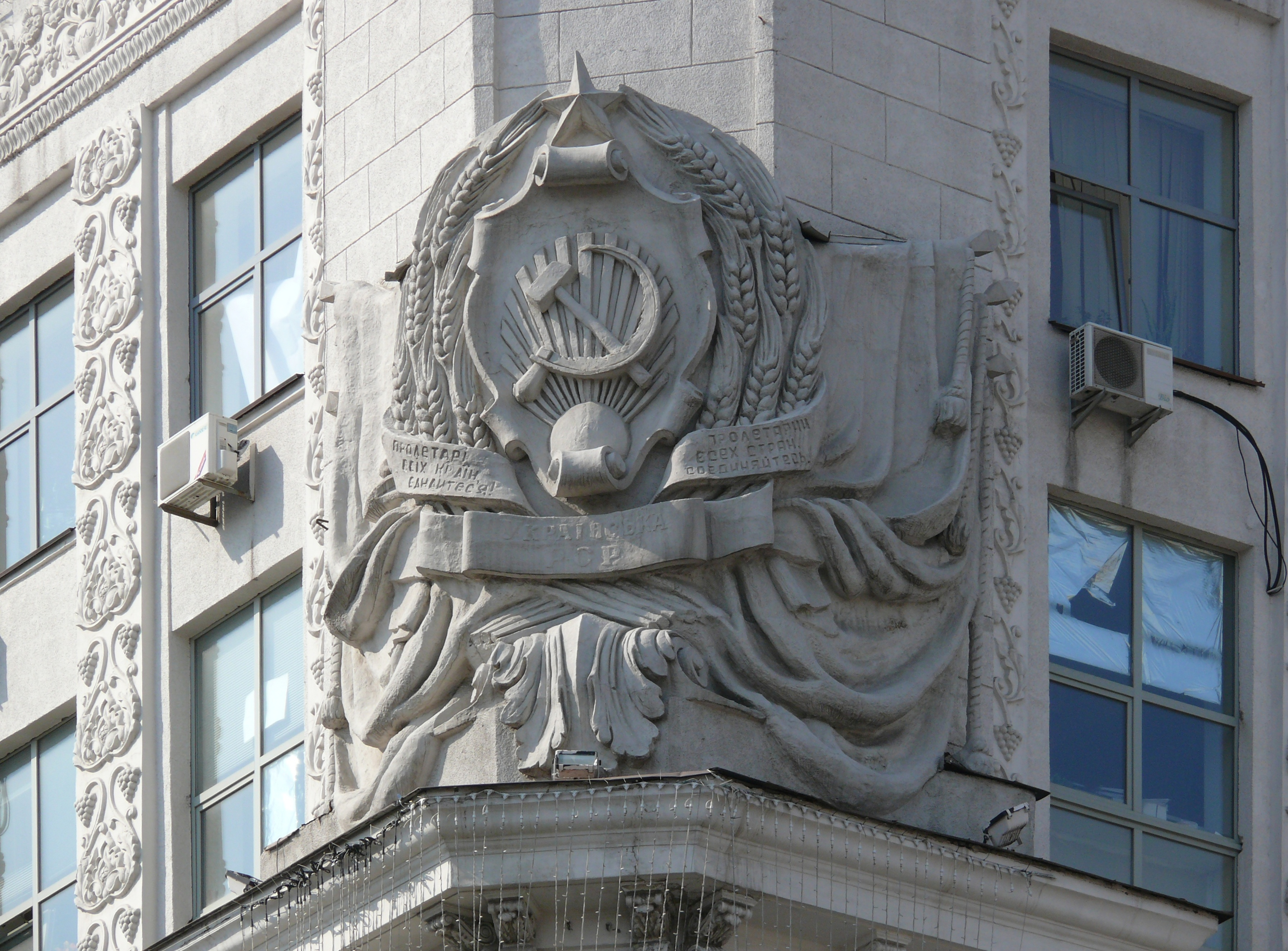
The Ukrainian SSR's emblem shown on top of Kharkiv's city hall in 2008.

== See also ==
- Flag of the Ukrainian Soviet Socialist Republic
- Anthem of the Ukrainian Soviet Socialist Republic
- Coat of arms of Ukraine
