= Flag of the Ukrainian Soviet Socialist Republic =

Ukrainian Soviet Socialist Republic
- Use: Civil and state flag, civil and state ensign
- Proportion: 1:2
- Adopted: 21 November 1949 (de facto); 5 July 1950 (de jure)
- Relinquished: 24 August 1991 (as sole national flag, de facto); 28 January 1992 (as co-national flag, de jure); 21 May 2015 (illegalized)
- Design: A horizontal bicolour of red over azure (light blue) with the golden hammer and sickle and gold-bordered star on top of the canton.
- Reverse flag
- Use: Civil and state flag, civil and state ensign
- Flag of the Ukrainian SSR (1991) and Ukraine (1991–)
- Use: National flag, civil and state ensign
- Proportion: 1:2
- Adopted: 24 August 1991
- Relinquished: 28 January 1992
- Design: A horizontal bicolour of blue and yellow.

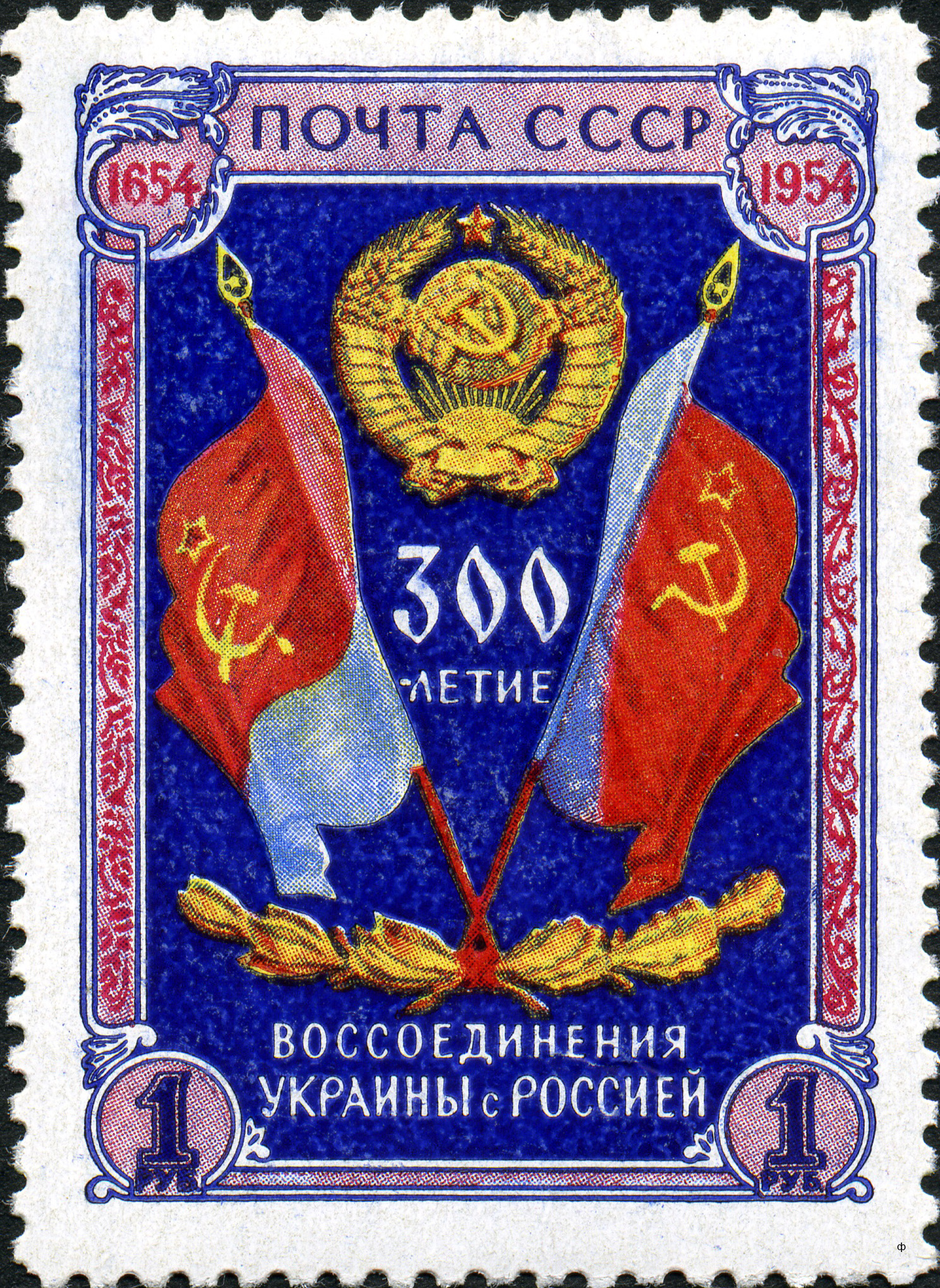
Flag of the Ukrainian SSR together with the Flag of the Russian SFSR on a 1954 Soviet stamp commemorating the "300th anniversary of Ukraine's reunification with Russia".

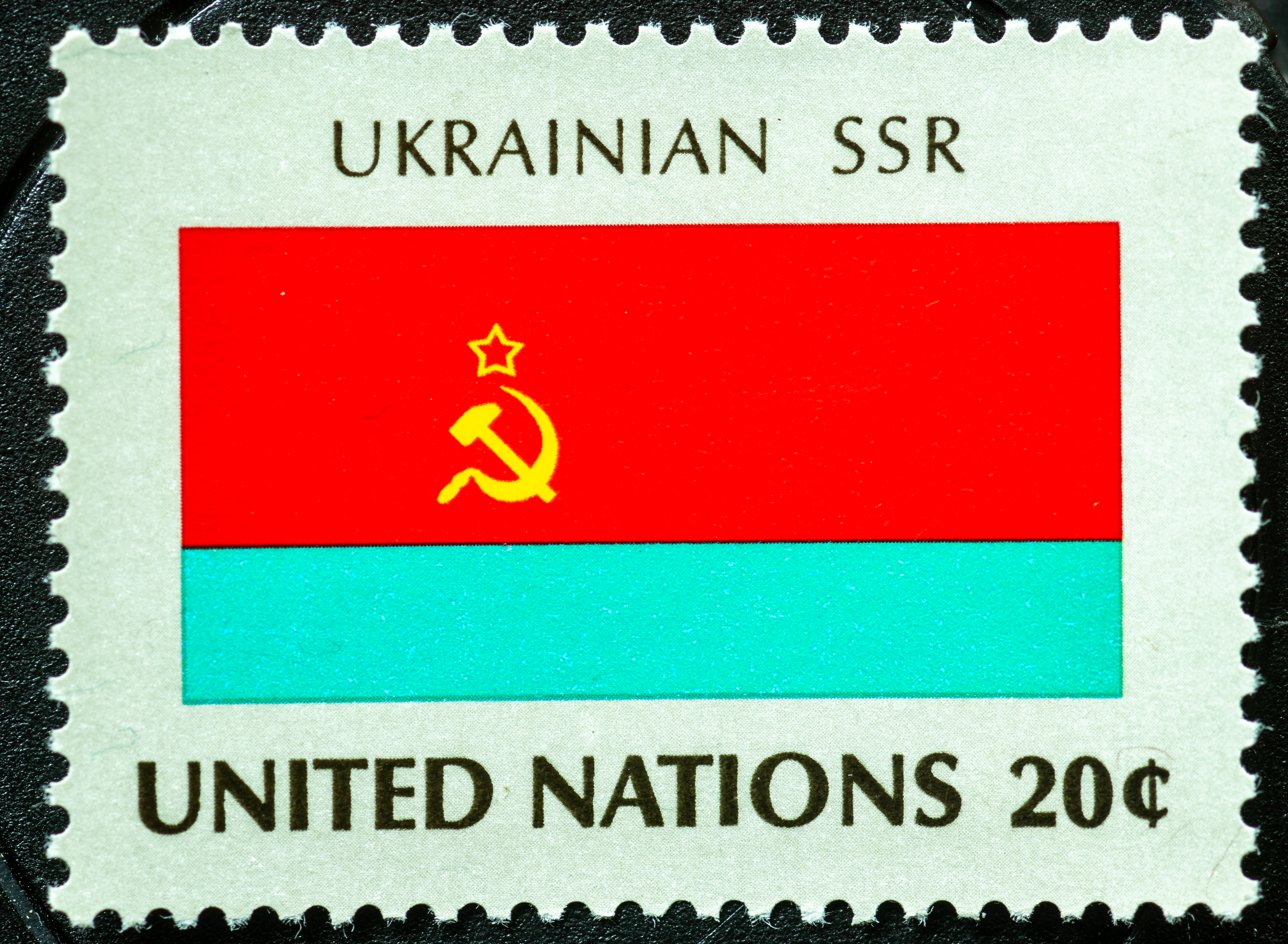
Flag of the Ukrainian SSR on a 1981 United Nations stamp

The first flag of the Ukrainian Soviet Socialist Republic (UkrSSR) (Note: Ukrainian: Прапор Української Радянської Соціалістичної Республіки; Russian: Флаг Украинской Советской Социалистической Республики) was adopted on 10 March 1919 to serve as the symbol of state of the Ukrainian SSR. Details of the official flag changed periodically before the collapse of the Soviet Union in 1991, but all had as their basis the communist red flag. According to the decree of the Presidium of Supreme Soviet of Ukrainian SSR on 21 November 1949, the blue in the bottom "symbolises the mightiness and beauty of the people, and the blue banner of Bohdan Khmelnytsky".

== Color scheme ==
Ukrainian Soviet Socialist Republic	Red	Azure	Gold
RGB	205/0/0	51/181/255	255/217/0
Hexadecimal	#CD0000	#33b5ff	#FFD900
CMYK	0/100/100/20	80/29/0/0	0/15/100/0
Pantone (approximate)	3546 C	638 U	Medium Yellow C

== History ==
Before this 1919 flag, a flag in 1918 was used with red and blue, with yellow stripes in the canton.

The first flag was red with the gold Cyrillic sans-serif letters У.С.С.Р. (USSR, acronym for Ukrayinskaya Sotsialisticheskaya Sovetskaya Respublika (Ukrainian Socialist Soviet Republic) in the Russian language). A decade later, the Ukrainian initials У.С.Р.Р. appeared (USRR, for Ukrayinsʹka Sotsialistychna Radyansʹka Respublika). In the 1930s a gold border was added. In 1937, a new flag was adopted, with a small gold hammer and sickle added above the gold Cyrillic serif letters УРСР (the name had changed, transposing the second and third words).

Flag of the Ukrainian PRS
(1917–1918)

Flag of the Ukrainian SR
(1918)

Flag of the Ukrainian SSR (1919–1929)

Flag of the Ukrainian SSR (1929–1937)

Flag of the Ukrainian SSR (1937–1950)

The Soviet Union and two of its republics (Ukraine and Byelorussia) all became members of the nascent United Nations (UN) in 1945. Since all of their flags were red with only small markings in the upper left corner, the UN demanded changes to the flags in 1949. To comply, the Ukrainian Soviet authorities dropped the lettering and added an azure horizontal stripe (1/3 of the width). The Ukrainian SSR adopted this new design as its official flag on 5 July 1950. Other constituent republics of the Soviet Union soon followed suit and customised the bottom third of their flags.

While the Soviet flag was flown in the later months of 1991, even after the failed coup d'état, the blue and yellow flag, even though it was a criminal offense under the Soviet law, was raised spontaneously throughout Ukraine by local activists between 14 March 1990 beginning at town of Stryi until the country's independence on 24 August 1991. The blue and yellow flag was provisionally adopted for official ceremonies in September 1991, although the Soviet-era flag officially remained until it was replaced on 28 January 1992.

=== Russo-Ukrainian War ===
In 2015, all Soviet symbolism, including the flags of the Ukrainian SSR, was recognized as a symbol of the totalitarian past and officially banned in Ukraine. Despite the ban, the flags of the Ukrainian SSR have been used in the some areas occupied by Russia during the Russian invasion of Ukraine.

Early variant of the flag of the Ukrainian SSR, before the unification of the hammer and sickle

Flag of the Ukrainian SSR (1950–1991)

First post-Soviet flag of Ukraine (since 24 August 1991, de facto co-flag)

== See also ==
- Emblem of the Ukrainian Soviet Socialist Republic
- Anthem of the Ukrainian Soviet Socialist Republic
- Flag of Ukraine
- List of flags of Ukraine
- Soviet imagery during the Russo-Ukrainian War
