= Handbook on History of the Communist Party and the Soviet Union 1898–1991 =

Handbook on History of the Communist Party and the Soviet Union 1898–1991 (Russian: Справочник по истории Коммунистической партии и Советского Союза 1898–1991) is a Russophone free access online encyclopedic information on history of the Communist Party of the USSR and its members.

The project is created on the initiative of Nafthali Hirschkowitz (Zikhron Yaakov), a creator and editor of the project. He is assisted by several specialists in a field of history across a vast territory of the former Soviet Union. Among those are experts in a field of historical science and others. The project started in 2005.

== See also ==
- Great Soviet Encyclopedia
