= Ukraine: A History =

1988 book

- Author: Orest Subtelny
- Language: English
- Publisher: University of Toronto Press
- Publication date: 1988
- Publication place: Canada
- Media type: Print
- Pages: 666
- ISBN: 978-0-8020-5808-9
- OCLC: 20722741
- Dewey Decimal: 947.1
- LC Class: DK508.51.S82

Ukraine: A History is a 1988 book on the history of Ukraine written by Orest Subtelny, a professor of history and political science at York University, Toronto, Ontario, Canada. It is a comprehensive survey of the history of the geographical area encompassed by what is modern-day Ukraine. Updated editions have been published in 1994 to include new material on the dissolution of the Soviet Union, 2000 to include Ukraine's first decade of independence, and 2009 to include the Orange Revolution and the effects of globalization on Ukraine.

== Overview ==
The history of Ukraine is divided into five parts in the book and presented chronologically, beginning with an introductory chapter on the prehistory of Ukraine titled The Earliest Times, followed by Part One: Kievan Rus', Part Two: The Polish-Lithuanian Period, Part Three: The Cossack Era, Part Four: Ukraine under Imperial Rule, and Part Five: Twentieth-Century Ukraine.

== Reviews ==
The book has received positive reviews from the Journal of Ukrainian Studies, Canadian Book Review Annual, Midwest Book Review, and World Affairs Report.

== Editions in Canada ==
- 1988, Toronto, Ontario, Canada, University of Toronto Press (ISBN 978-0-8020-5808-9, 978-0-8020-6775-3) 1st ed.
- 1994, Toronto, Ontario, Canada, University of Toronto Press (ISBN 978-0-8020-7191-0, 978-0-8020-0591-5) 2nd ed.
- 2000, Toronto, Ontario, Canada, University of Toronto Press (ISBN 978-0-8020-4871-4, 978-0-8020-8390-6) 3rd ed.
- 2009, Toronto, Ontario, Canada, University of Toronto Press (ISBN 978-1-4426-4016-0, 978-1-4426-0991-4) 4th ed.

== Editions in Ukraine ==
- 1991, Kyiv, Ukraine, translation from English by Y. Shevchuk. Lybid (Publishing House) ISBN 978-5-325-00090-4 1st.Ukr. ed.
- 1992, Kyiv, Ukraine, translation from English by Y. Shevchuk. Lybid (Publishing House) ISBN 5-325-00090-X 2nd.Ukr. ed.
- 1993, Kyiv, Ukraine, translation from English by Y. Shevchuk. Lybid (Publishing House) ISBN 978-5-325-00451-3 3rd ed., Revised and supplemented

=== First reviews in Ukrainian ===
- in Ukrainian: Peter Yakovenko. Orest Subtelny. Ukraine: A History. K.: Lybid, 1991 (review of 1 ed.), Political Science Readings, 1991, № 1, p. 306–308
- in Ukrainian: Peter Yakovenko. A story we do not know: Orest Subtelny. Ukraine: A History. K .: Lybid, 1993. (Review of 3 editions). Viche journal Verkhovna Rada, 1994, № 3, p. 151–154

== See also ==
- Bibliography of Ukrainian history
