= List of centenarians (politicians and civil servants) =

The following is a list of centenarians – specifically, people who became famous as politicians and government servants – known for reasons other than their longevity. For more lists, see lists of centenarians.

Supercentenarians (above 110 years old)
Living

Name	Lifespan	Age	Reason for Notability
Nermin Abadan Unat	1921–2025	104	Turkish politician, writer and senator (1978–1980)
Ali Yahia Abdennour	1921–2021	100	Algerian politician, lawyer and human rights activist
Ibrahim Abi-Ackel	1926–	100	Brazilian politician
V. S. Achuthanandan	1923–2025	101	Indian politician, activist, writer, theoretician and chief minister of Kerala (2006–2011)
Valdas Adamkus	1926–	100	Lithuanian politician and president (1998–2003; 2004–2009)
Amīr Aṣlān Afshār	1919–2021	101	Iranian politician and diplomat
Maria Sole Agnelli	1925–2025	100	Italian politician and businesswoman
Giuseppe Alessi	1905–2009	103	Italian politician and president of Sicily (1947–1949; 1955–1956)
Syed Babar Ali	1926–	100	Pakistani politician, businessman and philanthropist
Pierre Aliker	1907–2013	106	Martinican politician, physician and independence activist
Vicente Almeida d'Eça	1918–2018	100	Portuguese politician, colonial administrator and colonial governor of Cape Verde (1974)
Magdalena Álvarez de Seminario	1920–	106	Argentine politician
Giuseppe Amadei	1919–2020	101	Italian politician
K. R. Gouri Amma	1919–2021	101	Indian politician
Randi Anda	1898–1999	100	Norwegian politician and deputy representative to the parliament of Norway
Doris Margaret Anderson	1922–2022	100	Canadian politician and nutritionist
Gerald Smedley Andrews	1903–2005	102	Canadian civil servant
Caroline Anthonypillai	1908–2009	100	Sri Lankan political activist, trade unionist and wife of S. C. C. Anthony Pillai
Frank Pierpoint Appleby	1913–2015	101	Canadian politician and member of the Legislative Assembly of Alberta (1971–1986)
George Ariyoshi	1926–2026	100	American politician, lawyer and third governor of Hawaii (1974–1986)
Ronald Atkins	1916–2020	104	British politician and MP for Preston North (1966–1970; 1974–1979)
Babiker Awadalla	1917–2019	101	Sudanese politician and prime minister (1969)
Rostyslav Babiychuk	1911–2013	101	Soviet-Ukrainian politician, Minister of Culture of Ukrainian SSR (1956–1971)
Robert L. Backman	1922–2022	100	American politician and member of the Utah House of Representatives (1971–1975)
Albertine Baclet	1922–	103	Guadeloupean politician
William Bains-Jordan	1916–2021	104	American politician and member of the Hawaii House of Representatives (1959–1962)
Henri Bangou	1922–2023	101	Guadeloupean politician
Haven J. Barlow	1922–2022	100	American politician, member of the Utah House of Representatives (1952–1955) and senate (1955–1994)
Francis Lodowic Bartels	1910–2010	100	Ghanaian diplomat and ambassador of West Germany (1970–1972)
Roscoe Bartlett	1926–	100	American politician
James O. Bass	1910–2019	108	American politician, member of the Tennessee House of Representatives (1936–1939) and senate (1940–1942)
Celâl Bayar	1883–1986	103	Turkish politician, prime minister (1937–1939) and third president (1950–1960)
Évelyne Baylet	1913–2014	101	French politician
Luis Bedoya Reyes	1919–2021	102	Peruvian politician, mayor of Lima (1964–1969) and founder and first president of Christian People's Party (1966–1999)
Armando León Bejarano	1916–2016	100	Mexican politician, governor of Morelos (1976–1982)
Francis Bellotti	1923–2024	101	American politician, attorney general (1975–1987) and lieutenant governor of Massachusetts (1963–1965)
Mustafa Ben Halim	1921–2021	100	Libyan politician and prime minister (1954–1957)
Helena Benitez	1914–2016	102	Filipino politician, senator (1967–1972) and member of Batasang Pambansa (1978–1986)
Carol Berman	1923–2023	100	American politician, member of the New York Senate (1979–1984)
Yitzhak Berman	1913–2013	100	Israeli politician, Speaker of the Knesset (1980–1981) and Minister of Energy and Infrastructure (1981–1982)
Richard N. Berry	1915–2018	102	American politician, member of the Maine House of Representatives (1960–1966) and senate (1966–1976)
Giovanni Bersani	1914–2014	100	Italian politician and MEP (1960–1989)
Earl Hanley Beshlin	1870–1971	101	American politician and member of the Pennsylvania House of Representatives (1917–1919)
Mordechai Bibi	1922–2023	100	Iraqi-born Israeli politician
Howard Bier	1919–2025	105	American politician, member (1959–1972) and speaker (1971–1972) of the North Dakota House of Representatives
Louis Bisdee	1910–2010	100	Australian politician and member of the Tasmanian Legislative Council (1959–1981)
Naftali Blumenthal	1922–2022	100	Israeli politician
W. Michael Blumenthal	1926–	100	German-born American politician, businessman and secretary of the treasury (1977–1979)
Stéphane Bonduel	1919–2021	102	French politician
Saul Bonnell	1871–1973	101	Canadian politician and member of the House of Commons for the Unionist Party
Meredith Bordeaux	1912–2014	101	American politician and member of the Maine House of Representatives (1979–1982)
Robert R. Bowie	1909–2013	104	American deputy director of the CIA
G. Holmes Braddock	1925–2025	100	American politician and member of the Miami-Dade County Public Schools (1963–2000)
Sir Harry Brittain	1873–1974	100	British politician, journalist and founder of the Empire Press Union; served in the parliament of the UK for Acton (1918–1929)
Theodore R. Britton Jr.	1925–	101	American government official
Emily Sophie Brown	1881–1985	103	American politician and member of the Connecticut House of Representatives (1921–1923)
Sir Mervyn Brown	1923–2023	100	British diplomat, ambassador to Madagascar (1967–1970), high commissioner to Tanzania (1975–1978) and Nigeria (1979–1983)
Dominick Browne, 4th Baron Oranmore and Browne	1901–2002	100	British politician and peer
Helen Brownson	1917–2017	100	American federal government employee and a pioneer in the development of the field of information science
James L. Buckley	1923–2023	100	American politician
Daniel Burke	1827–1927	100	Australian politician and member of the Tasmanian House of Assembly (1893–1903)
Morley Byron Bursey	1912–2013	101	Canadian diplomat
Mortimer Caplin	1916–2019	103	American political appointee
Reinhold O. Carlson	1905–2006	100	American politician, mayor of Des Moines, Iowa
Jimmy Carter	1924–2024	100	American politician, 39th president of the United States (1977–1981), 76th governor of Georgia (1971–1975), 2002 Nobel Peace Prize laureate and humanitarian
Mohan Lal Chakma	1911/1912–2013 (Note: Exact birthdate is not known)	101	Indian politician, Member of the Legislative Assembly (MLA) for Pencharthal, Tripura (1978–1983)
Albin Chalandon	1920–2020	100	French politician
Alun Gwynne Jones, Baron Chalfont	1919–2020	100	British politician, junior minister and life peer
André Chandernagor	1921–2025	104	French politician
Saul Cherniack	1917–2018	101	Canadian politician and lawyer
Selahattin Çetiner	1922–2023	100	Turkish politician
Chau Sen Cocsal Chhum	1905–2009	103	Cambodian politician and civil servant, acting prime minister (1962) and president of the National Assembly (1962–1963; 1966–1968)
Gaositwe Chiepe	1922–2025	102	Botswanan politician and diplomat
Smyly Chinery	1923–2024	101	Ghanaian civil servant
Binod Bihari Chowdhury	1911–2013	102	Bangladeshi anti-colonial revolutionary and social worker
Tony Christopher, Baron Christopher	1925–2026	101	British politician and peer
Sir Chung Sze-yuen	1917–2018	101	Hong Kong politician
Alfred Chupin	1916–2021	104	French politician
Maria Lisa Cinciari Rodano	1921–2023	102	Italian politician and last living member of Legislature I of Italy
Keir Clark	1910–2010	100	Canadian politician
George W. Clarke	1906–2006	100	American politician and Washington state legislator
Merwin Coad	1924–2025	100	American politician and member of the House of Representatives from Iowa (1957–1963)
Roswell K. Colcord	1839–1939	100	American politician, Governor of Nevada (1891–1895)
Cornelius Cole	1822–1924	102	American politician, senator from California (1867–1873) and longest-lived U.S. senator
Tom Copeland	1924–2025	101	American politician and member of the Washington House of Representatives (1957–1973)
Benedetto Cottone	1917–2018	100	Italian politician
Dame Elizabeth Couchman	1876–1982	106	Australian politician
Emogene Creque	1919–2025	106	British Virgin Islands politician
Sir Walter Crocker	1902–2002	100	Australian politician, diplomat and writer
Louis Crump	1916–2019	102	American politician
John Crutcher	1916–2017	100	American politician and lieutenant governor of Kansas (1965–1969)
Birgit Dalland	1907–2007	100	Norwegian politician
Emilio D'Amore	1915–2017	101	Italian politician and journalist
Jimmie Davis	1899–2000	101	American politician and governor of Louisiana (1944–1948; 1960–1964)
Sir Alan Dawtry	1915–2018	102	British local government official and chief executive of Westminster City Council (1956–1977)
Clifford DeBaptiste	1924–	102	American politician and funeral director
Aracy de Carvalho	1908–2011	102	Brazilian diplomatic clerk
Javier Pérez de Cuéllar	1920–2020	100	Peruvian politician and diplomat, prime minister (2000–2001) and Secretary-General of the United Nations (1982–1991)
Philippe de Gaulle	1921–2024	102	French politician, admiral and only son of Charles de Gaulle
Peter J. De Muth	1892–1993	101	American politician, member of the U.S. House of Representatives (D-PA)
Gene Derfler	1924–2026	101	American politician
Joseph Frederick Wallet DesBarres	1721–1824	102	Swiss-born Canadian cartographer and statesman
Leon Despres	1908–2009	101	American politician, attorney and member of the Chicago City Council
Georges-Casimir Dessaulles	1827–1930	102	Canadian politician, diplomat and businessman
Charles S. Dewey	1880–1980	100	American politician, member of the U.S. House of Representatives (R-IL)
Boubacar Biro Diallo	1922–2025	103	Guinean politician and president of National Assembly (1995–2002)
Frank DiPaolo	1906–2013	106	American politician and activist
Đỗ Mười	1917–2018	101	Vietnamese politician, prime minister (1988–1991)
DeLoris Doederlein	1925–	101	American politician and educator
Floyd Dominy	1909–2010	100	American bureaucrat, Commissioner of the United States Bureau of Reclamation
Haddon Donald	1917–2018	101	New Zealander politician
William I. Donnermeyer Sr.	1924–2025	100	American politician, member of the Kentucky House of Representatives
Fred J. Doocy	1913–2017	104	American politician and banker, lieutenant governor of Connecticut (1966–1967) and senator (1958–1967)
Kazi Lhendup Dorjee	1904–2007	102	Indian politician and first Chief Minister of Sikkim (1975–1979)
Willem Drees	1886–1988	101	Dutch politician and prime minister (1948–1958)
Jeanne Driessen	1892–1997	105	Belgian politician
Andreana Družina	1920–2021	101	Slovenian political commissar and partisan People's Hero of Yugoslavia
Du Runsheng	1913–2015	102	Chinese politician, military officer, revolutionary leader and economist
Sir Patrick Duffy	1920–2026	105	British politician, Member of Parliament
Eleanor Lansing Dulles	1895–1996	101	American diplomat
Roland Dumas	1922–2024	101	French politician
James R. Dumpson	1909–2012	103	American civil servant
Luis Echeverría	1922–2022	100	Mexican politician and president (1970–1976)
Fanny Edelman	1911–2011	100	Argentine politician
Don Edwards	1915–2015	100	American politician, member of the U.S. House of Representatives (D–CA)
Ek Yi Oun	1910–2013	101–103	Cambodian politician and prime minister (1958)
Şükrü Elekdağ	1924–	102	Turkish politician, diplomat and academician
Jules Ellenberger	1871–1973	102	British civil servant and colonial administrator of Botswana
John Banks Elliott	1917–2018	101	Ghanaian diplomat and ambassador to the Soviet Union (1960–1966)
Nils Elowsson	1890–1999	109	Swedish politician
Dale Engstrom	1917–2018	100	American politician, member of the Tennessee House of Representatives (1971–1972)
Juan Ponce Enrile	1924–2025	101	Filipino politician and president of the senate of the Philippines (2008–2013)
Emmanuel Evans-Anfom	1919–2021	101	Ghanaian physician, scholar, university administrator and public servant
Wilbur Faiss	1911–2013	102	American politician and Nevada legislature
Josef Felder	1900–2000	100	German politician
Dino Felisetti	1919–2021	102	Italian politician and lawyer
Edward Fenlon	1903–2010	106	American politician and member of the Michigan House of Representatives
Gerardo Fernández Albor	1917–2018	100	Spanish politician and president of Galicia (1982–1987)
Xenia Field	1894–1998	103	British politician and member of the London County Council
Eddie Filgate	1915–2017	101	Irish politician
Hamilton Fish III	1888–1991	102	American politician and member of the U.S. House of Representatives (R-NY)
Sergio Flamigni	1925–2025	100	Italian politician, writer, deputy (1968–1979) and senator (1979–1987)
James Folks	1897–2001	103	American politician, Michigan state legislator
Victor Fontana	1916–2017	101	Brazilian politician
Thelma Forbes	1910–2012	101	Canadian politician
Renzo Franzo	1914–2018	103	Italian politician, member of the Chamber of Deputies (1948–1968)
Elizabeth Hawley Gasque	1886–1989	103	American politician, member of the U.S. House of Representatives (D–SC)
Dorothy Geeben	1908–2010	101	American politician, mayor of Ocean Breeze Park, Florida
Robert Gerhart	1920–2021	100	American politician, member of the Pennsylvania House of Representatives (1967–1968) and senate (1969–1972)
Hubert Germain	1920–2021	101	French politician, deputy (1962–1973) and mayor of Saint-Chéron, Essonne (1953–1965)
Wylie Gibbs	1922–2026	103	Australian politician and member of the Australian House of Representatives (1963–1969)
Henry R. Gibson	1837–1938	100	American politician, member of the U.S. House of Representatives (R-TN)
Jim L. Gillis Jr.	1916–2018	101	American politician and member of the Georgia State Senate (1938; 1945–1946)
Mavis Gilmour	1926–	100	Jamaican politician and medical practitioner
Marinus van der Goes van Naters	1900–2005	104	Dutch politician, MEP and MP
Cécile Goldet	1914–2019	105	French politician
Bernardino González Ruiz	1911–2012	101	Panamanian politician, acting president (1963)
Edgar Granville, Baron Granville of Eye	1898–1998	100	British politician and life peer
Joseph P. Graw	1915–2018	103	American politician, member of the Minnesota House of Representatives (1963–1974)
Bill Grayden	1920–2026	105	Australian politician and MP for Swan (1949–1954)
Alan Greenspan	1926–2026	100	American economist and chairman of the Federal Reserve (1987–2006)
Carol Greitzer	1925–2026	101	American politician
Frank J. Guarini	1924–2026	101	American politician, member of the U.S. House of Representatives (1979–1993)
Emídio Guerreiro	1899–2005	105	Portuguese politician
Driss Guiga	1924–2026	101	Tunisian politician
Amedeo Guillet	1909–2010	101	Italian diplomat and officer
Nilüfer Gürsoy	1921–2024	103	Turkish politician, philologist, memoirist and daughter of the third president Celâl Bayar
Hamida Habibullah	1916–2018	101	Indian politician, member of the Rajya Sabha Uttar Pradesh Legislative Assembly for Haidergarh
DeWitt Hale	1917–2018	100	American politician and member of the Texas House of Representatives (1939–1940; 1953–1978)
Ruth Hamilton	1898–2008	109	American politician and New Hampshire state legislator
Reinhard Hardegen	1913–2018	105	German politician and military officer
G. Homer Harding	1925–	100	American politician
Emma Harman	1912–2020	108	American politician and Washington State legislator
Karl-Günther von Hase	1917–2021	103	German diplomat and ambassador to the United Kingdom (1970–1977)
Sir Cosmo Haskard	1916–2017	100	British politician, governor of the Falkland Islands (1964–1970)
Malik Dohan al-Hassan	1919–2021	101	Iraqi politician, minister of justice (2004–2005)
Hau Pei-tsun	1919–2020	100	Taiwanese politician and premier (1990–1993)
Augustus F. Hawkins	1907–2007	100	American politician and member of the U.S. House of Representatives (D-CA)
Bert Hazell	1907–2009	101	British politician and MP
He Jingzhi	1924–	102	Chinese politician and poet
Ken Hechler	1914–2016	102	American politician, member of the U.S. House of Representatives (1959–1977) and Secretary of State of West Virginia (1985–2001)
John N. Heiskell	1872–1972	100	American politician and senator from Arkansas (1913)
Gerard Helders	1905–2013	107	Dutch politician
Fritz Hellwig	1912–2017	104	German politician and European Commissioner
Andrés Henestrosa	1906–2008	101	Mexican politician
Sir Lenox Hewitt	1917–2020	102	Australian public servant
Prince Naruhiko Higashikuni	1887–1990	102	Japanese politician and prince, prime minister (1945)
Helen F. Holt	1913–2015	101	American politician and West Virginia state legislator
Louise Horne	1912–2021	108	Trinidadian politician and nutritionist
Christopher Hornsrud	1859–1960	101	Norwegian politician, prime minister and minister of finance (1928)
Hsu Li-nung	1919–2025	106	Taiwanese politician, general and minister of Veterans Affairs Commission of the Republic of China (1987–1993)
Henry Hu	1920–2025	105	Chinese politician
Arthur J. Hubbard Sr.	1912–2014	102	American politician
Oscar E. Huber	1917–2017	100	American politician
Tom Hughes	1923–2024	101	Australian politician and attorney general (1969–1971)
Merlin Hulse	1923–	103	American politician and farmer
Johan van Hulst	1911–2018	107	Dutch chess player, politician, MEP and MP
Les Hunkin	1884–1984	100	Australian politician and member of the MHA for Labor Party
Francis Huré	1916–2021	105	French diplomat
Margaret Hurley	1909–2015	105	American politician and Washington state legislator (D–WA)
Sheikh Mukhtar Mohamed Hussein	1911/1912–2012	100	Somali politician, acting president (1969)
Jeremy Hutchinson, Baron Hutchinson of Lullington	1915–2017	102	British lawyer and life peer
Hwang Sun-hui	1919–2020	100	North Korean politician
Hyun Soong-jong	1919–2020	101	South Korean politician and prime minister (1992–1993)
Paul Ignatius	1920–2025	104	American politician and former Secretary of the Navy (1967–1969)
Pietro Ingrao	1915–2015	100	Italian politician
Mircea Ionescu-Quintus	1917–2017	100	Ukrainian-born Romanian politician
Guillermo Irizarry	1916–2017	101	Puerto Rican politician and secretary of state (1966–1969)
Brajamohan Jamatia	1905–2012	106	Indian politician
Arthur Walter James	1912–2015	103	British politician and journalist
Duberildo Jaque	1921–2022	101	Chilean politician, lawyer and deputy (1961–1973)
Jiao Ruoyu	1915–2020	104	Chinese politician, ambassador to North Korea (1965–1970), Peru (1972–1977), Iran (1977–1979) and mayor of Beijing (1981–1983)
Pedro Jiménez Galán	1920–2021	100	Spanish politician
John B. Johnson	1885–1985	100	American politician, South Dakota legislature
Grace Joncas	1923–2024	100	American politician, member of the New Hampshire House of Representatives
Denny Jones	1910–2012	101	American politician, Oregon legislature
Piet de Jong	1915–2016	101	Dutch politician, prime minister (1967–1971) and MP
Geri M. Joseph	1923–2023	100	American diplomat, Ambassador to the Netherlands (1978–1981)
Russell Jump	1895–2000	105	American politician, mayor of Wichita, Kansas
Nestori Kaasalainen	1915–2016	101	Finnish politician
Bernard Kalb	1922–2023	100	American politician, author and journalist
T. M. Kaliannan Gounder	1921–2021	100	Indian politician
Konstantinos Kallias	1901–2004	102	Greek politician
Toshiko Karasawa	1911–2013	102	Japanese politician
Toshikazu Kase	1903–2004	101	Japanese diplomat
Sheila Kaul	1915–2015	100	Indian politician
Ke Hua	1915–2019	103	Chinese diplomat
Dan Keating	1902–2007	105	Irish politician and last surviving veteran of the Irish War of Independence
Othman Kechrid	1920–2021	100	Tunisian politician
George F. Kennan	1904–2005	101	American Cold War policy architect
F. Ray Keyser Sr.	1898–2001	102	American politician
Roedad Khan	1923–2024	100	Pakistani politician and civil servant
Aslam Khattak	1908–2008	100	Pakistani politician
Thanat Khoman	1914–2016	101	Thai politician
Kim Yong-ju	1920–2021	101	North Korean politician, vice president (1993–1997), vice premier (1974–1975) and head of the OGD (1959–1974)
Fuller Kimbrell	1909–2013	103	American politician
Elisabeth Kirkby	1921–2026	105	English-born Australian politician
Henry Kissinger	1923–2023	100	German-born American politician, secretary of state (1973–1977) and 1973 Nobel Peace Prize laureate
William V. Knott	1863–1965	101	American treasurer of Florida
Juliana Young Koo	1905–2017	111	Chinese-American diplomat
Angeline Kopka	1916–2016	100	American politician
Bernard Leo Korchinski	1905–2006	100	Canadian politician
Vera Korsakova	1920–2022	102	Soviet-Russian politician and Hero of Socialist Labour
Kondapalli Koteswaramma	1918–2018	100	Indian communist politician and writer
Boris Kravtsov	1922–	103	Russian politician and jurist
William Krehm	1913–2019	105	Canadian political activist and Spanish Civil War volunteer
Tan Sri Devaki Ayathurai Krishnan	1923–2024	100	Malaysian politician
Eusi Kwayana	1925–2026	101	Guyanese politician
Alf Landon	1887–1987	100	American politician, governor of Kansas (1933–1937) and unsuccessful U.S. presidential nominee (1936)
Howard B. Lee	1879–1985	105	American politician
Lei Jieqiong	1905–2011	105	Chinese politician, activist and sociologist
James F. Leonard	1920–2020	100	American diplomat and ambassador to the United Nations (1977–1979)
Axel Lewenhaupt	1917–2018	101	Swedish diplomat
Li Rui	1917–2019	101	Chinese politician
José Manuel Liaño Flores	1921–2022	100	Spanish politician, lawyer and mayor of A Coruña (1976–1979)
Haakon Lie	1905–2009	103	Norwegian politician and Labour Party secretary
Yegor Ligachyov	1920–2021	100	Soviet-Russian politician and Second Secretary of the Communist Party of the Soviet Union (1985–1990)
Lin Hujia	1916–2018	101	Chinese politician
Ling Yun	1917–2018	100	Chinese politician
Liu Jie	1915–2018	103	Chinese politician
Budimir Lončar	1924–2024	100	Croatian politician and diplomat
Rodrigo Lozano de la Fuente	1920–2022	101	Spanish politician and senator (1977–1979)
Florence Alice Lubega	1917–2021	103	Ugandan politician
Bernt H. Lund	1924–2026	101	Norwegian politician, diplomat and civil servant
Sonomyn Luvsangombo	1924–2026	101	Mongolian politician
Lü Zhengcao	1904–2009	105	Chinese politician and military officer
Vassos Lyssarides	1920–2021	100	Cypriot politician and physician, president of the House of Representatives (1985–1991) and founder of EDEK
Ma Shitu	1915–2024	109	Chinese politician, writer and deputy (1983–1993)
Ana Carmen Macri	1916–2022	105	Argentine politician
József Madarász	1814–1915	100	Hungarian politician, speaker of the House of Representatives (1898–1899)
Mahathir Mohamad	1925–	101	Malaysian prime minister (1981–2003, 2018–2020)
Dayton S. Mak	1917–2018	100	American diplomat
Georg Malin	1926–	100	Liechtensteiner sculptor, artist, historian and politician
Branko Mamula	1921–2021	100	Yugoslav politician and army officer
Josip Manolić	1920–2024	104	Croatian politician, prime minister (1990–1991)
Jean Maran	1920–2021	101	French politician, deputy (1986–1988) and mayor of Sainte-Luce, Martinique (1965–1990)
Sigurd Marcussen	1905–2006	101	Norwegian politician
Ángel Martín Taboas	1918–2023	105	Puerto Rican politician
Anita Martinez	1925–2026	100	American politician
Petar Matić Dule	1920–2024	104	Yugoslav politician and army general
J. William Middendorf	1924–2025	101	American politician, ambassador and former Secretary of the Navy (1974–1977)
Sir Moses Montefiore	1784–1885	100	British politician and Sheriff of London
Francisco Morales-Bermúdez	1921–2022	100	Peruvian politician, prime minister (1975) and president (1975–1980)
Adriano Moreira	1922–2022	100	Portuguese politician, MP (1980–1995) and member of the council of state (2016–2019)
Cecil Morgan	1898–1999	100	American politician
Ziya Müezzinoğlu	1919–2020	101	Turkish politician
Victor Mukete	1918–2021	102	Cameroonian politician
William Mulock	1843–1944	101	Canadian politician
Tomiichi Murayama	1924–2025	101	Japanese politician, prime minister (1994–1996) and chairman of the Social Democratic Party (1993–1996)
Thomas Patrick Murray	1880–1981	101	Canadian politician
Gordon Mydland	1922–2022	100	American politician, attorney general of South Dakota (1969–1973) and member of South Dakota Senate (1963–1968)
Mary Jane McCaffree	1911–2018	106	American White House Social Secretary (1955–1961)
Hazel McCallion	1921–2023	101	Canadian politician, businesswoman and mayor of Mississauga
Doug McClelland	1926–	100	Australian politician, senator (1962–1987) and president of the senate (1983–1987)
Lloyd McCuiston	1918–2021	103	American politician and member (1961–1994) and speaker (1981–1983) of the Arkansas House of Representatives
Richard McHeffy	1773–1874	100	Canadian politician and member of the Legislative Assembly of Nova Scotia
Cameron Ross McIntosh	1871–1971	100	Canadian politician and newspaper publisher
Brockway McMillan	1915–2016	101	American Director of the National Reconnaissance Office
Donald Naddy	1917–2017	100	American politician
V. M. M. Nair	1919–2021	101	Indian diplomat
Yasuhiro Nakasone	1918–2019	101	Japanese politician, prime minister and president of the Liberal Democratic Party (LDP) (1982–1987)
R. Nallakannu	1924–2026	101	Indian politician
Charles Navarro	1904–2005	101	American politician
Duncan Ndegwa	1925–	101	Kenyan civil servant
Eric Neal	1924–2025	101	Australian banker, politician, academic administrator and commissioner of Sydney (1987–1988) and governor of South Australia (1996–2001)
Lucien Nedzi	1925–2025	100	American politician, member of the U.S. House of Representatives (1961–1981)
Hazel Newhook	1914–2016	101	Canadian politician
Ng Hong-mun	1926–2026	100	Chinese politician
Nguyễn Côn	1916–2022	105	Vietnamese politician, deputy prime minister (1967–1976)
Nguyễn Văn Trân	1917–2018	101	Vietnamese politician, minister of Transport (1955–1960)
Charles Njonjo	1920–2022	101	Kenyan politician
Lois North	1921–2025	103	American politician
Adriana Olguín	1911–2015	104	Chilean politician
Dame Kathleen Ollerenshaw	1912–2014	101	British politician and mathematician
Arthur Olsen	1914–2014	100	American politician
Frances Penrose Owen	1900–2002	102	American civil servant
Mehrdad Pahlbod	1917–2018	101	Iranian politician
Yiannis Papadimitriou	1912–2019	107	Greek politician and lawyer
George Alexander Parks	1883–1984	100	American politician and territorial governor of Alaska (1925–1933)
Norman McLeod Paterson	1883–1983	100	Canadian politician, senator and first chancellor of Lakehead University (1965–1970)
Borys Paton	1918–2020	101	Ukrainian politician and scientist, deputy of the Supreme Soviet of the Soviet Union (1962–1989), member of the National Security and Defense Council of Ukraine (1992–1994; 1997–2005; 2008–2010)
Stylianos Pattakos	1912–2016	103	Greek politician, military officer and last living member of the Greek junta
William Paul	1846–1947	100	Australian politician
Nelia Penman	1915–2017	101	British politician and barrister
Franca Pilla	1920–	105	First Lady of Italy (1999–2006) as the wife of Carlo Azeglio Ciampi and currently oldest living former first lady in the world
Aiyappan Pillai	1914–2022	107	Indian politician, lawyer and writer
Antoine Pinay	1891–1994	102	French politician, prime minister (1952–1953)
Alan Prince	1915–2015	100	Canadian civil servant
André Prunet-Foch	1914–2017	102	French Veguer (1977–1980)
Rosamma Punnoose	1913–2013	100	Indian politician
Qian Liren	1924–	102	Chinese politician, diplomat and translator
Qian Min	1915–2016	100	Chinese politician
Edward Bernard Raczyński	1891–1993	101	Polish diplomat and president in exile
Balram Singh Rai	1921–2022	100	Guyanese politician
V. K. Rao	1914–2018	104	Indian civil servant
Irma Rapuzzi	1910–2018	107	French politician
Maharaja Krishna Rasgotra	1924–	102	Indian diplomat and foreign secretary (1982–1985)
Marshall Rauch	1923–2025	102	American politician
Richard Gavin Reid	1879–1980	101	Canadian politician for the United Farmers of Alberta (UFA) and premier of Alberta (1934–1935)
William Ferguson Reid	1925–	101	American politician, physician and civil rights activist
Ernie Renzel	1907–2007	100	American politician, mayor of San Jose, California
Fazlollah Reza	1915–2019	104	Iranian diplomat
Ri Yong-suk	1916–2021	105	North Korean politician, deputy and revolutionary (1998–2009)
Susana Richa	1924–	102	Panamanian politician, educator and essayist
Adelina Rodriguez	1920–2021	101	Filipino politician
Guillermo Rodríguez	1923–	103	Ecuadorian politician, acting president (1972–1976) and military leader
María Isabel Rodríguez	1922–	104	Salvadoran politician, physician and academic
William Ronan	1912–2014	101	American civil servant, chairman of the New York Metropolitan Transportation Authority (1968–1974)
Elmer Roper	1893–1994	101	Canadian politician, mayor of Edmonton
Neville Roper	1922–2023	101	Canadian politician, member of the Legislative Assembly of Alberta (1967–1971)
Albert Rosellini	1910–2011	101	American politician, governor of Washington (1957–1965)
Nellie Tayloe Ross	1876–1977	101	American politician, governor of Wyoming (1925–1927) and first female governor in the USA
Ruan Posheng	1916–2017	100	Chinese politician
Marie M. Runyon	1915–2018	103	American politician, activist and New York state legislator
Dorothy Rupert	1926–	100	American politician
Anthony E. Russo	1926–	100	American politician
P. Sabanayagam	1922–2023	101	Indian civil servant
Abdul Salam Sabrah	1912–2012	100	Yemeni politician and judge, former prime minister (1969; 1971)
Abang Muhammad Salahuddin	1921–2022	100	Malaysian governor of Sarawak (1977–1981; 2001–2014)
Susanna M. Salter	1860–1961	101	American politician, mayor of Argonia, Kansas and first female mayor in the USA
N. Sankaraiah	1921–2023	102	Indian politician, Tamil Nadu MLA (1967–1971; 1977–1984)
Henry Sayler	1921–2021	100	American politician
Wilhelmine Schirmer-Pröscher	1889–1992	102	East German politician
Eleonore Schönborn	1920–2022	101	Austrian politician
Calvin W. Schuneman	1926–	100	American politician
Sir George Ernest Schuster	1881–1982	101	British politician, barrister, financier and colonial administrator
Emma Clara Schweer	1896–2001	105	American politician
Murray Seasongood	1878–1983	104	American politician, mayor of Cincinnati
Ralph Seitsinger	1916–2016	100	American politician, mayor of El Paso, Texas
Ramón Serrano Suñer	1901–2003	101	Spanish politician
Jean-Claude Servan-Schreiber	1918–2018	100	French politician and journalist
Mohammad Hasan Sharq	1925–	101	Afghan politician, head of government (1988–1989)
Keshavram Kashiram Shastri	1905–2006	101	Indian politician
Michael Shaw, Baron Shaw of Northstead	1920–2021	100	British politician
Shi Ping	1911–2024	112	Chinese politician and academic
Manny Shinwell	1884–1986	101	British politician
Maudelle Shirek	1911–2013	101	American politician and activist
George Shultz	1920–2021	100	American politician, secretary of State (1982–1989), Treasury (1972–1974), Labor (1969–1970) and OMB director (1970–1972)
R. Smith Simpson	1906–2010	103	American Foreign Service Officer
Khamtai Siphandone	1924–2025	101	Laotian politician, prime minister (1991–1998) and president (1998–2006)
Olga Sippl	1920–2025	105	German politician
Clark S. Smith	1912–2014	102	American politician
Ken Smith	1926–	100	American politician
Neal Smith	1920–2021	101	American politician, member of the U.S. House of Representatives (1959–1995) and longest serving congressman in Iowa
Knut Söderwall	1874–1980	105	Swedish politician
Alejandra Soler	1913–2017	103	Spanish politician, diplomat, activist and schoolteacher
Song Ping	1917–2026	108	Chinese politician
Soong Mei-ling	1898–2003	105	Chinese politician, activist and wife of Chiang Kai-shek
Mihai Șora	1916–2023	106	Romanian politician
Leslie Spoor	1910–2011	100	Scottish politician, activist and founder of the Scottish Green Party
George B. Stallings Jr.	1918–2018	100	American politician
William Alex Stolt	1900–2001	100	American politician, mayor of Anchorage, Alaska
Arnljot Strømme Svendsen	1921–2022	100	Norwegian politician and economist
John Ward Studebaker	1887–1989	102	American politician, Commissioner of Education (1934–1948)
M. Bala Subramanion	1917–2021	103	Singaporean civil servant
Henrik Svensen	1904–2007	103	Norwegian politician and MP
Taisto Tähkämaa	1924–2025	101	Finnish politician
Ali Tanrıyar	1914–2017	103	Turkish politician
Lars Erik Taxell	1913–2013	100	Finnish politician and legal scholar
J. Paul Taylor	1920–2023	102	American politician
Maris Harvey Taylor	1876–1982	105	American politician
Theodore Cooke Taylor	1850–1952	102	British politician
Agustín Téllez Cruces	1918–2024	105	Mexican politician and lawyer
Maurice Thatcher	1870–1973	102	American politician, military governor of the Panama Canal Zone (1910–1913) and representative from Kentucky (1923–1933)
Dimosthenis Theocharidis	1914–2019	104	Greek politician and lawyer
Arthur L. Thurlow	1913–2020	107	Canadian politician, member of the Nova Scotia House of Assembly (1949–1953)
Strom Thurmond	1902–2003	100	American politician, governor of South Carolina (1947–1951), senator from South Carolina (1954–2003) and unsuccessful U.S. presidential nominee (1948)
Raymonde Tillon	1915–2016	100	French politician
Per Tønder	1911–2015	104	Norwegian politician
Sir Simon Towneley	1921–2022	100	British Lord Lieutenant of Lancashire (1976–1997)
Tseng Wen-hui	1926–	100	Taiwanese politician, former first lady of the Republic of China after the 1947 Constitution and the widow of former president Lee Teng-hui
J. Randolph Tucker Jr.	1914–2015	101	American politician and attorney
Jean Turco	1917–	108	French politician
Ralph Turlington	1920–2021	100	American politician, member (1950–1974) and speaker (1967–1969) of the Florida House of Representatives
Feliks Uciechowski	1920–2022	101	Polish politician and schoolteacher
Masaru Urata	1925–2026	100	Japanese politician
César Yanes Urías	1920–2024	104	Salvadoran politician and naval officer
Jane Ellen Usher	1917–2018	101	Belizean politician
Arna Vågen	1905–2005	100	Norwegian politician
Zachary A. Vane	1892–1993	100	American politician
Telmo Vargas	1912–2013	100	Ecuadorian politician and acting president (1966)
Anne Vermeer	1916–2018	101	Dutch politician, MP and mayor
George S. Vest	1918–2021	102	American diplomat and State Department official
Anton Vratuša	1915–2017	102	Slovenian politician, diplomat, prime minister (1978–1980) and Yugoslavia's ambassador to the United Nations (1967–1969)
Abdoulaye Wade	1926–	100	Senegalese politician and president (2000–2012)
John A. Walker	1912–2012	100	American politician
Wang Bingqian	1925–2025	100	Chinese politician
Wang Dingguo	1912–2020	108	Chinese politician
Wang Hanbin	1925–	101	Chinese politician
Phan Wannamethee	1923–	103	Thai diplomat and secretary general of ASEAN
David Wark	1804–1905	101	Canadian senator
William H. Webster	1924–2025	101	American politician, CIA and FBI director
T. K. Whitaker	1916–2017	100	Irish economist, politician, diplomat and civil servant
G. William Whitehurst	1925–2026	101	American politician, member of the U.S. House of Representatives (1969–1987)
Cornelius Wiebe	1893–1999	106	Canadian politician
E. J. Williams	1918–2021	103	Canadian politician for the Progressive Conservative Party of Manitoba
Francis Drake Willmott	1904–2004	100	Australian politician
John Wingblade	1883–1984	101	Canadian politician, member of the Legislative Assembly of Alberta (1935–1963)
John S. Wold	1916–2017	100	American politician
Bernard B. Wolfe	1914–2016	101	American politician
Lester L. Wolff	1919–2021	102	American politician
Xu Jiatun	1916–2016	100	Chinese politician and dissident
Yadlapati Venkata Rao	1919–2022	102	Indian politician
Tanko Yakasai	1925–	100	Nigerian politician
Katsumi Yamauchi	1911–2012	100	Japanese politician
Chamnan Yaovabun	1914–2015	100	Thai politician and diplomat
Aleksandr Yezhevsky	1915–2017	101	Soviet politician
William Young	1912–2012	100	Australian politician
Joseph Zeller	1918–2018	100	American politician, member of the Pennsylvania House of Representatives (1971–1980)
Zhang Jieqing	1912–2015	102	Chinese politician and writer
Zhang Jingfu	1914–2015	101	Chinese politician and state councillor
Zhang Lixiong	1913–2024	110	Chinese politician and military officer
Zhang Qun	1889–1990	101	Chinese politician and premier (1947–1948)
Zheng Tuobin	1924–	102	Chinese politician
Jutta Zilliacus	1925–2026	100	Finnish journalist, author and politician
John C. Zimmerman Sr.	1835–1935	100	German-born American politician, mayor of Flint, Michigan
Xenophon Zolotas	1904–2004	100	Greek politician and economist, interim prime minister (1989–1990)
Zou Yan	1915–2022	106	Chinese politician and military general
Zou Yu	1920–	106	Chinese politician and jurist
