= Driessen =

Driessen is a Dutch and Low German patronymic surname meaning son of Dries or Andries cognate to Andreas and the English Drew/Andrew. People with the name Driessen, Driesen, Driessens, or Drießen include:

- Casey Driessen (born 1978), American bluegrass fiddler
- Dan Driessen (born 1951), American baseball player
- David Driessen (born 1994), Dutch football forward
- Ellert Driessen (born 1958), Dutch singer-songwriters
- Friedrich Wilhelm von Driesen (1781–1851), Baltic-Russian military officer
- Jack Driessen (born 1980), Dutch music composer
- Jeanne Driessen (1892–1997), Flemish politician
- Johan Driessen (born 1981), Dutch politician
- Lomme Driessens (1912–2006), Belgian cycling directeur sportif
- Michiel Driessen (born 1959), Dutch fencer
- Paul Driessen (animator) (born 1940), Dutch film director, animator and writer
- Paul Driessen (lobbyist) (born 1948), American author and lobbyist
- Robert Driesen, American politician
- Stef Driesen (born 1966), Belgian artist
- Steffen Driesen (born 1981), German swimmer
- Tim Driesen (born 1978), Belgian actor
- Wilma Driessen (born 1938), Dutch opera singer
- Yannick Driesen (born 1988), Belgian basketball player
- Mati Driessen (1910–1990), German honored as Righteous Gentile at Yad Vashem in Israel

== See also ==
- Andriessen
- Drezdenko (German name Driesen), Polish town
