= Cottone =

Cottone is a surname of Italian origin. Notable people with this surname include:

- Antonio Cottone (1904/1905–1956), Italian member of the Sicilian Mafia
- Benedetto Cottone (1917–2018), Italian politician
- Carlo Cottone, prince of Castelnuovo, (1756–1829), Italian politician, advocate of the Sicilian Constitution of 1812
- Jay Cottone (born 1949), American football player
- Maegan Cottone, British American songwriter, singer, vocal producer and vocal arranger
- Robert Rocco Cottone (born 1952), American psychologist, ethicist, counselor, poet, and professor

== See also ==
- Cotton (surname)
