= Von Driesen =

== People ==
- Friedrich Wilhelm von Driesen (1781-1851), general officer of the imperial Russian army.
- Georg Wilhelm von Driesen (1700-1758), lieutenant general in Frederick the Great's Prussian army.

== See also ==
- 4th (Westphalian) Cuirassiers "von Driesen", a heavy cavalry regiment of the Royal Prussian Army.
