= Faiss =

Faiss or Faiß is a German surname derived from a nickname for a corpulent person. Notable people with the surname include:

- Fritz Faiss (1905–1981), German-American artist
- Theo Faiss (1907–1914), Brazil-born Swiss child death
- Wilbur Faiss (1911–2013), American politician
