= Confucius Peace Prize =

Award

- Awarded for: Promotion of world peace from an Eastern, Confucian perspective
- Date: December 9, 2010
- Country: People's Republic of China
- Presented by: Private committee
- First award: 2010
- Final award: 2017

Confucius Peace Prize
- Traditional Chinese: 孔子和平獎
- Simplified Chinese: 孔子和平奖
Transcriptions
Standard Mandarin
- Hanyu Pinyin: Kǒngzǐ Hépíngjiǎng
- Wade–Giles: K'ung^{3}-tzu^{3} He^{2}-p'ing^{2}-chiang^{3}
Yue: Cantonese
- Yale Romanization: Kung3 Dz3 He2ping2jyang2
- Jyutping: Hung^{2} Zi^{2} Wo^{4} peng^{4} zoeng^{2}
Southern Min
- Hokkien POJ: Khóng-chú Hô-pêng Chióng

The Confucius Peace Prize (simplified Chinese: 孔子和平奖; traditional Chinese: 孔子和平獎; pinyin: Kǒngzǐ Hépíngjiǎng) was a Chinese alternative to the Nobel Peace Prize established in 2010 by the Association of Chinese Indigenous Arts in the People's Republic of China (PRC). The prize was created in response to a proposal by businessman Liu Zhiqin that criticized the 2010 Nobel Peace Prize, which was awarded to Chinese dissident Liu Xiaobo. The chairman of the committee said that the award existed to "promote world peace from an Eastern perspective", and Confucian peace specifically. The original cash prize given to the winner in 2010 was ¥100,000 RMB (US$15,000).

Despite an attempt by China's Ministry of Culture to ban the prize in September 2011, the original organizers re-established in Hong Kong as the "China International Peace Research Center", awarding the prize to Vladimir Putin in November 2011, to Kofi Annan and Yuan Longping in 2012, to Fidel Castro in 2014, to Robert Mugabe in 2015, and Hun Sen in 2017. The Chinese government has denied having any connections with the prize. The Prize Committee has been disbanded since 2018.

== Origins and first award ==
The Confucius Peace Prize originated as a response to the announcement that Chinese dissident Liu Xiaobo had won the 2010 Nobel Peace Prize; the awarding of the prize to Liu was viewed negatively in China, with some in the government arguing that Liu did not promote "international friendship, disarmament, and peace meetings", the stated goals of the Nobel Peace Prize. Competing groups staked claims to its founding, and some have links to the Ministry of Culture.

According to The New York Times, Liu Zhiqin, a prominent Chinese scholar and banker, was the first to propose the prize, in a commentary in the Chinese Communist Party-owned tabloid Global Times. Liu's commentary stated, "The Nobel Peace Prize Committee won Liu Xiaobo while losing the trust of 1.3 billion Chinese people. They support a criminal while creating 1.3 billion 'dissidents' that are dissatisfied with the Nobel Committee, which is definitely a bad decision. ... China's civil society should consider setting up a 'Confucius Peace Prize', launching the evaluation and selection and finding the real Peace Prize winners from all over the world. This is the best opportunity for the Chinese to declare China's view in peace and human rights to the world."

The Association of Chinese Indigenous Arts, which is registered with the Chinese Cultural Ministry, awarded the first prize to Taiwanese politician Lien Chan in December 2010, for his contribution to developing positive ties between Taiwan and mainland China. Lien never claimed the prize. China's Minister of Culture talked to the United Daily News in Taipei and stated they had never heard of this prize for Lien Chan until there was newspaper coverage. The Hong Kong newspaper Ming Pao reported that the letter issued by the committee to Lien Chan did not have the Ministry of Culture's official seal. The award, consisting of a small sculpture and a bundle of banknotes, was collected by a young girl in front of an audience of some 100 journalists. In the jostling, one group tried to create the "Confucius World Peace Prize" to rival the "Confucius Peace Prize".

== Purported cancellation and second award ==
In September 2011, the Ministry of Culture stated that it would be disbanding the organizers of Confucius Peace Prize and cancelling the prize. The Ministry stated in a news conference on September 17 that there were improper uses of the Ministry's name. The Association of Chinese Indigenous Arts was quick to blame a "rogue department" for the debacle surrounding the award.

Despite the cancellation, on November 15, 2011, The Guardian reported that the original organizers had formed a new committee, the China International Peace Studies Center, in Hong Kong, where they awarded the second Confucius Peace Prize to Russian prime minister Vladimir Putin. Other contenders were Angela Merkel, Bill Gates, Jacob Zuma, Kofi Annan, Yuan Longping, Gyaincain Norbu (one of the Panchen Lamas), and Soong Chu-yu. Putin won for his opposition to NATO involvement in the Libyan Civil War as well as his decision to go to war in Chechnya in 1999. According to the committee, Putin's "Iron hand and toughness revealed in this war impressed the Russians a lot, and he was regarded to be capable of bringing safety and stability to Russia." Putin was also praised for fulfilling his childhood dream of joining the KGB. The 2011 award, a gilded statuette of Confucius was given out on December 9 along with a certificate, although the committee did not mention a cash prize. The award ceremony featured a speech by Kong Qingdong. Kong claimed that the award accurately reflects Confucius's original vision of peace.

== The award and later recipients ==
The prize initially carried a financial reward of CNY100,000, and has been awarded at the same time as the Nobel Peace Prize. In 2012, the China International Peace Studies Centre claimed that the new reward of $1.5 million – mostly derived from sales of works of the committee chairman's, Qiao Damo – was "more than the US$1.2 million that the recipient of this year's Nobel Peace Prize, will receive". However, The Guardian reported in 2015 that the cash prize was worth CNY500,000 (£51,000).

=== 2012 ===
The shortlist for the 2012 award consisted of previous nominees Kofi Annan, Bill Gates, agricultural scientist Yuan Longping, and Gyancain Norbu, as well as Ban Ki-moon, Thai prime minister Yingluck Shinawatra, Chinese philosopher Tang Yijie, and Wang Dingguo, the last surviving female participant in Mao Zedong's Long March. Due to a tie in the voting, the committee announced that Annan and Yuan would share the award.

=== 2013 ===
Zen master Yicheng was awarded the 2013 prize for his work as chairman of the Buddhist Association of China and his contribution for Chinese Buddhism. As an addition to the Peace Prize in 2013 the first Confucius Art Prize was awarded. A gold medal was for calligrapher Ouyang Zhongshi and silver medals for Yang Lin and Hou Mingming.

=== 2014 ===
The Global Times reported that nominees included former Cuban president, Fidel Castro, South Korean President Park Geun-hye and the UN Secretary-General Ban Ki-moon. The 2014 recipient of the prize was Castro, who when leader of Cuba, "never used any violence or force when faced with problems and conflicts in international relations, especially in Cuba's relationship with the United States." Castro's prize was received by a Cuban student in China.

=== 2015 ===
Nominated for the award in 2015 were the Chinese Taoist Association, Ban Ki-moon, former Japanese prime ministers Yasuo Fukuda and Tomiichi Murayama, Kazakhstan president Nursultan Nazarbayev, Bill Gates, Chinese-American politician Anna Chennault, South Korean president Park Geun-hye, Hsing Yun of the Fo Guang Shan Buddhist movement in Taiwan, and Robert Mugabe of Zimbabwe. Mugabe was eventually declared the winner for "working tirelessly to build the political and economic stability of his country, bringing peace to the people of Zimbabwe, strongly supporting pan-Africanism and African independence, and making unparalleled contributions for the renaissance of African civilisation." One of the committee's 76 members disclosed that only 36 voted for Mugabe over concerns for his record, saying that "Mugabe has been in power for such a long time that he could be easily be labelled a dictator, tyrant or despot." Mugabe, who made a speech to the United Nations that day in which he declared that "we are not gays", did not collect his prize.

The award drew out critics of Mugabe and his human rights record. An unofficial spokesman said that the Chinese government had notified Zimbabwe that it was not associated with the conferring organisation. Mugabe repudiated the award, a spokesman saying that he "receives many prizes without even knowing, approving or receiving them. What is dramatic in this case is that oppositional interests drew a revolver at the mentioning of an honour or prize to Robert Mugabe. That is what Hitler did when someone mentioned 'culture' to him".

=== 2016 ===
The prize for 2016 was awarded posthumously to three Chinese peacekeepers who were killed while serving on United Nations peacekeeping missions in Mali and South Sudan. Shen Liangliang was killed while serving on the mission in Mali on May 31, 2016 while Yang Shupeng and Li Lei were killed while serving on the mission in South Sudan on July 10, 2016.

=== 2017 ===
Candidates for the 2017 prize were Hun Sen, Gyaincain Norbu, Rodrigo Duterte, Bashar al-Assad, Angela Merkel, Hsing Yun, the Chinese Taoist Association, Xuecheng, Pope Francis, and Yancan. The Prime Minister of Cambodia Hun Sen was announced to be the winner.

== Responses ==
Most organizations have not treated the prize seriously. The Ministry of Culture of the People's Republic of China denied any cooperation with the Association of Chinese Indigenous Arts to present the prize, stating that prior to foreign press reports, the Ministry "had never even heard of the name". The ministry added that "the government is very careful" and "if the government genuinely intended to establish a 'Confucius Peace prize', it would not have been implemented so sloppily." Mainland media did not widely report about the prize in 2010, with journalists claiming that they had come across neither the organization nor the prize, believing it to be "a farce" (闹剧).

Netizens in mainland China responded to the Prize with widespread humour as well as derision, referring to the prize organizers as "bullheaded dreaming idiots", "jokes", and "embarrassments to Chinese", as well as suspicion that the prize was a practical joke.

The Confucius Peace Prize's first winner, Lien Chan, claimed he had not officially heard that he had won; an aide said that they had only received "secondhand information from journalists". Tsai Chi-chang, a spokesperson for the opposition Democratic Progressive Party in Taiwan, said the award should not be taken seriously.

Officials from the Taiwanese government are reported to have found the award of the Confucius Peace Prize to Lien Chan "amusing". When asked by a reporter about the prize, a spokesman for Vladimir Putin said that he had heard about the award through the press, but that "we do not know much about the prize."

Western media was more split: some reacted to the prize with mockery, but others treated it more seriously. The Economist compared the substitute award to the reaction by Nazi Germany and the creation of the German National Prize for Art and Science after Carl von Ossietzky was prohibited from accepting his Nobel Prize in 1935, as well as the Soviet Union preventing Andrei Sakharov from accepting his Nobel Peace Prize in 1975. National Review likewise compared the prize to Hitler's and Stalin's responses to the Nobel Peace Prize. Slate has described the prize as "[s]omething of a trolling exercise".

In 2015, Ankit Panda, editor-at-large of The Diplomat, wrote a column regarding Western responses to the award of the Confucius Peace Prize to Robert Mugabe, saying, "[T]he government of the People's Republic of China hasn't quite responded to perceived Western affronts with the sort of pettiness that the Confucian Peace Prize represents. So remember, while it is outrageous that Robert Mugabe would win anything called a 'Peace Prize,' it's been given to him by a private group of Chinese citizens based in Hong Kong with no affiliation with the Chinese government."

== Winners ==
- 2010 – Lien Chan
- 2011 – Vladimir Putin
- 2012 – Kofi Annan and Yuan Longping
- 2013 – Yicheng
- 2014 – Fidel Castro
- 2015 – Robert Mugabe
- 2016 – Shen Liangliang (申亮亮), Yang Shupeng (杨树朋), and Li Lei (李磊)
- 2017 – Hun Sen

== See also ==
- Nobel Prize controversies
