= Joaquín López =

Joaquín López may refer to:

- Joaquín Lopez (field hockey) (born 1990), Brazilian field hockey player
- Joaquin Lopez (Argentine footballer) (born 1995), Argentine footballer
- Joaquin Lopez (Chilean footballer), Chilean footballer
- Joaquín López (Filipino footballer), Filipino footballer
- Joaquín María López y López (1798–1855), Spanish politician, writer and journalist, twice Prime Minister of Spain
- Joaquín López-Dóriga (born 1947), Spanish Mexican journalist
- Joaquín López Menéndez (1939–2019), Spanish mayor
