= José Manuel Liaño Flores =

Spanish lawyer and politician (1921–2022)

Mayor of A Coruña
- In office 1 February 1976 – 3 April 1979
- Preceded by: Jaime Hervada
- Succeeded by: Domingos Merino

Member of Cortes Españolas
- In office 1967–1977

Personal details
- Born: 15 November 1921 Monforte de Lemos, Spain
- Died: 5 May 2022 (aged 100) A Coruña, Spain

José Manuel Liaño Flores (15 November 1921 – 5 May 2022) was a Spanish lawyer and politician. He served in the Cortes Españolas of Francoist Spain from 1967 to 1977, and was the mayor of A Coruña (1976–1979).

== Biography ==
Born in Monforte de Lemos in the Province of Lugo, Liaño Flores graduated with a law degree from the University of Santiago de Compostela and qualified as a judge at the age of 23.

Liaño Flores served in the Cortes Españolas of Francoist Spain from 1967 to 1977. On 1 February 1976 he succeeded Jaime Hervada as the first mayor of A Coruña after the death of Francisco Franco. During his time in office, he founded the University College, which evolved into the University of A Coruña. Other achievements included the founding of the water company and the completion of the reservoir at Cecebre, as well as works on the Santa Margarita park. He decided not to run in the first democratic municipal elections in 1979, and vowed to leave politics. He also served as a pundit on local station Radio Voz.

Liaño Flores marked his 100th birthday on 15 November 2021. He continued his legal practice until his death the following 5 May, being recognised as the longest-serving lawyer in Spain.

== See also ==
- List of centenarians (politicians and civil servants)
