= Arun Kumar Chakma =

Indian politician

Member of Tripura Legislative Assembly
- In office 2003–2018
- Preceded by: Anil Chakma
- Succeeded by: Santana Chakma
- Constituency: Pencharthal

Personal details
- Born: 1 January 1951 (age 75) Pecharthal, Tripura, India
- Party: Communist Party of India (Marxist)
- Spouse: Tapasi Dewan

Arun Kumar Chakma is an Indian politician and a member of the Communist Party of India (Marxist). He was a member of the Tripura Legislative Assembly for three consecutive terms from 2003 to 2018 representing the Pencharthal Assembly constituency.
