= Ouyang Zhongshi =

Chinese actor, calligrapher, and singer (1928–2020)

Ouyang Zhongshi (Chinese: 欧阳中石; pinyin: Ōuyáng ZhōngShí) (October 1928 – 5 November 2020) was a Chinese actor, calligrapher, and singer.

== Biography ==
He was director of Chinese Calligraphers Association and associate professor in Capital Normal University. Graduated from high school, Ouyang Zhongshi studied at Fu Jen Catholic University which merged into Beijing Normal University in 1952. A year later, he transferred to Philosophy Department of Peking University. His tutor was the Chinese philosopher and logician, Jin Yuelin. After graduating from Peking University in 1954, he started his teaching career in middle schools. In 1982, he was transferred to Beijing Teachers' School, which now is Capital Normal University, to teach calligraphy. In 2013 Zhongshi was the winner of the gold medal for the first Confucius Art Prize, an addition to the Confucius Peace Prize.

He died on 5 November 2020, aged 92.
