= Anil Chakma =

Indian politician

Member of Tripura Legislative Assembly
- In office 1993–2003
- Preceded by: Sushil Kumar Chakma
- Succeeded by: Arun Kumar Chakma
- Constituency: Pencharthal

Personal details
- Born: Pecharthal, Tripura, India
- Died: May 31, 2025
- Party: Communist Party of India (Marxist)

Anil Chakma was an Indian politician and a member of the Communist Party of India (Marxist). He was a member of the Tripura Legislative Assembly for two consecutive terms from 1993 to 2003 representing the Pencharthal Assembly constituency.
