= Peng Zhen =

Chinese politician (1902–1997)

- 彭真
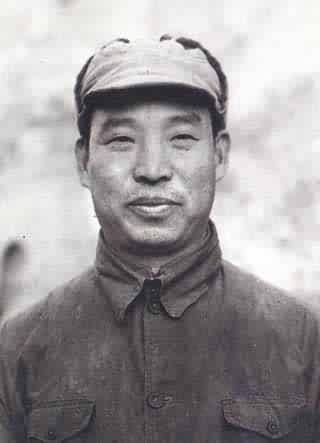
- Peng in 1945

4th Chairman of the Standing Committee of the National People's Congress
- In office June 17, 1983 – April 8, 1988
- Preceded by: Ye Jianying
- Succeeded by: Wan Li

Secretary of the Central Political and Legal Affairs Commission
- In office March 1980 – May 1983
- Preceded by: Office Created
- Succeeded by: Chen Pixian

Party Secretary of Beijing
- In office December 13, 1948 – May 1966
- Preceded by: Office created
- Succeeded by: Li Xuefeng

Personal details
- Born: October 12, 1902 Houma, Shanxi, Qing China
- Died: April 26, 1997 (aged 94) Beijing, China
- Party: Chinese Communist Party (1923–1997)
- Spouse: Zhang Jieqing

Peng Zhen
- Chinese: 彭真
Transcriptions
Standard Mandarin
- Hanyu Pinyin: Péng Zhēn
- Wade–Giles: P'eng Chen

Peng Zhen (pronounced [pʰə̌ŋ ʈʂə́n]; October 12, 1902 – April 26, 1997) was a Chinese politician and leading member of the Chinese Communist Party. He led the party organization in Beijing following the victory of the Communists in the Chinese Civil War in 1949, but was purged during the Cultural Revolution for opposing Mao's views on the role of literature in relation to the state. He was rehabilitated under Deng Xiaoping in 1982 along with other 'wrongly accused' officials, and became the inaugural head of the Central Political and Legal Affairs Commission.

== Early life ==
Peng Zhen was born Fu Maogong on 12 October 1902, in Dieshang village, Quwo County, Shanxi, in what is now the city of Houma. His parents, Fu Weishan and Wei Guizhi, were farmers. As a child, he worked in the fields, and the family spun thread at night to make ends meet. In 1919, he entered the Quwo County No. 2 Higher Primary School.

=== Early revolutionary activities ===
In 1922, Fu entered the Shanxi Provincial No. 1 Middle School in Taiyuan, where he joined a progressive youth society and took up Marxism. That winter, he became head of a school for the poor run by the society. In the winter of 1923, on the recommendation of Gao Junyu and Li Yutang, he joined the Chinese Communist Party (CCP). When the first CCP organisation in Shanxi was established in 1924, he became a member of the committee of the party's Taiyuan branch and later its secretary, and he led the founding of a Taiyuan association to promote a national assembly, serving as its chief secretary.

In January 1925, Fu guided the founding of the Shanxi Workers' Federation, and in February, he became secretary of the Taiyuan committee of the Communist Youth League. In May, he helped lead a campaign against a property valuation tax imposed by the warlord Yan Xishan, who withdrew the tax. After the May Thirtieth Incident, he organised a Shanxi association to protest the killings and served as its vice-chairman, and in July and August, he helped to establish labour organisations in Taiyuan, including a federation of trade unions. In late August 1925, the party transferred him to Shijiazhuang, where he became secretary of the Zhengtai Railway general union and helped to re-establish it. In March and April 1926, he organised a strike at Shijiazhuang's Daxing cotton mill. In May 1926, he was transferred to Tianjin, where, until the summer of 1927, he served successively as secretary of several of the party's district committees, as head of the organisation department of its Tianjin committee and as a member of its labour movement committee.

In mid-August 1927, Fu became acting secretary of the CCP's Tianjin committee, and in November, its secretary; he then went to Tangshan to help prepare a workers' uprising. In February 1928, he joined the standing committee of the party's Shunzhi provincial committee, which covered Hebei and the surrounding region, and after its secretary, Li Jida, was arrested and executed, he served as acting secretary, head of its organisation department and secretary of the Tianjin special district committee. In February 1929, when the Tianjin special district committee was reorganised as the CCP Tianjin work office, he became its secretary. In June 1929, after an informant betrayed the Tianjin underground party, he was arrested. After his release from prison in 1935, he became head of the party's Tianjin working group, directed the Tianjin student union and, at the request of the CCP's Northern Bureau, rebuilt the party's Tianjin committee.

In April 1936, Liu Shaoqi arrived in Tianjin to reorganise the Northern Bureau and appointed Fu head of its organisation department. Fu set up a party committee for students in Beiping (as Beijing was then called) and reorganised the party's Beiping committee, and he led the national headquarters of the Chinese National Liberation Vanguard.

=== Second Sino-Japanese War ===
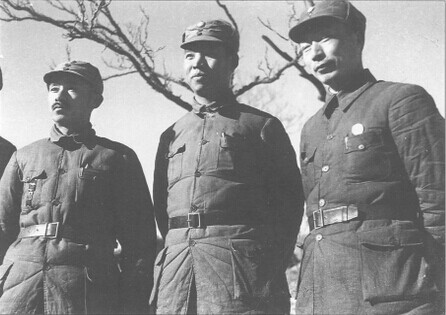
Guan Xiangying, Peng and Nie Rongzhen in 1938, when Peng was the Northern Bureau's representative in the Jin-Cha-Ji Border Region

In January 1937, Fu guided the founding of the Beiping National Salvation Federation, and in February, he guided the first national congress of the Chinese National Liberation Vanguard in Beiping. In May, he attended a conference of representatives of the Communist-held areas, where he chaired the delegation from the "white areas" under Nationalist control. In July, he became head of the Northern Bureau's organisation department, and he later moved with the bureau to Taiyuan to direct the party's underground work in north China. That year, he took the name Peng Zhen, adopting his grandmother's surname, Peng, and the given name Zhen ("truth"), which he explained as "upholding the truth and seeking the facts".

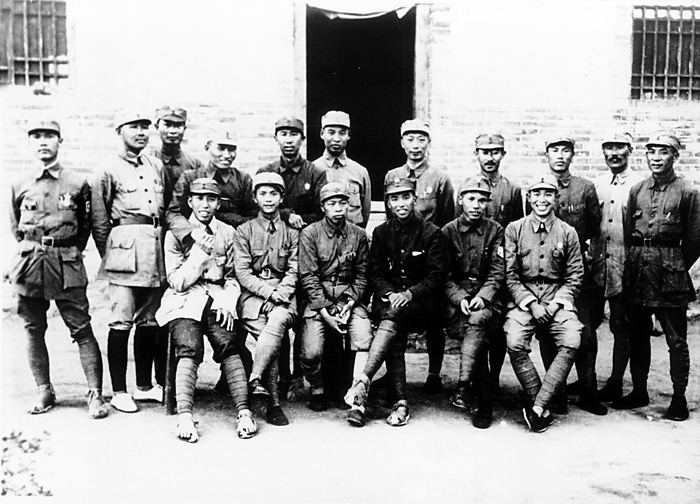
A meeting of the Jin-Cha-Ji Military Region at Hejiazhuang, Tang County, Hebei, in 1939; Peng is sixth from the left in the back row

In 1938, Peng became secretary of the CCP's Jin-Cha-Ji sub-bureau and helped to direct the East Hebei uprising. In 1939, he also became head of the party school of the newly established Northern sub-bureau. In October 1939, he chaired the sub-bureau's conference on organisational work, and he then directed the party's response to the December Incident (also known as the Jinxi Incident) in Shanxi. In 1940, he held a series of cadre meetings of the sub-bureau to set out policies for consolidating the party's work and its base areas during the war. In August 1940, he oversaw the drafting of the sub-bureau's administrative programme for the Jin-Cha-Ji Border Region, known as the "Double Ten Programme", under which elections and political and economic reforms were carried out in the region.

In 1941, Peng went to Yan'an, where he worked at the Central Party School, becoming its director of education in September. In 1942, the Politburo placed the school directly under the Secretariat, with Mao Zedong responsible for its political direction and Peng remaining director of education. In 1943, Mao became president of the school, and Peng became its vice-president. On 5 March 1944, Peng became acting head of the Organization Department, and he took part in drafting the 1945 resolution on questions in the party's history. On 5 June 1944, he became head of the party's urban work committee, and on 1 September, head of its urban work department. During the Yan'an Rectification Movement, he gave a concluding report on "questions of the method of thought".

In 1945, Peng attended the Seventh Party Congress, where he chaired the credentials committee and was elected to the Central Committee. On 19 June, at the first plenary session of the Seventh Central Committee, he was elected to the Politburo, and in August, he was made an alternate secretary of the Secretariat.

=== Chinese Civil War ===
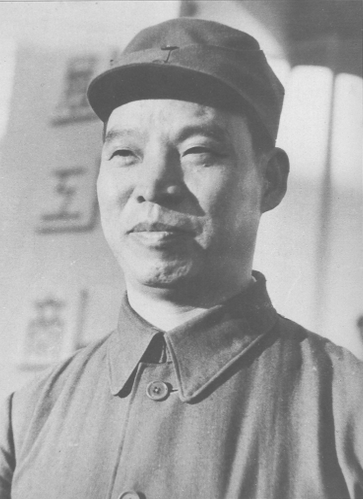
Peng in September 1945, as secretary of the CCP Northeast Bureau

After the war with Japan ended, Manchuria was occupied by the Soviet Red Army, and both the Communists and the Nationalists sought to take control of the region once Soviet forces withdrew. The CCP leadership appointed Peng secretary of its Northeast Bureau and moved troops from Shandong to the northeast, with Lin Biao in command at the front. To facilitate negotiations with the Soviet army, the party's Central Military Commission gave Peng the temporary rank of lieutenant general. In September 1945, Peng, Chen Yun, Ye Jizhuang, Wu Xiuquan and others flew towards Shenyang on a Soviet aircraft; during a refuelling stop at Shanhaiguan, the plane overran the runway into a wheat field, and Peng suffered a blow to the head. The group continued by train and reached Shenyang on 18 September. On 31 October, Peng became first political commissar of the Northeast People's Autonomous Army, which was renamed the Northeast Democratic United Army in January 1946.

In March 1946, the Northeast Bureau under Peng decided to occupy Changchun, Harbin and Qiqihar to secure northern Manchuria. After Communist forces took the three cities in April, the Nationalists sent elite units of Sun Li-jen's New 1st Army, Liao Yaoxiang's New 6th Army and Chen Mingren's 71st Army, under the command of Bai Chongxi and Du Yuming, to north. Although Lin Biao and Chen Yun proposed withdrawing from Changchun, the Northeast Bureau, at the insistence of the party leadership, decided to hold the city; Lin's forces were defeated at Siping and withdrew north of the Songhua River. According to Weng Yanqing, the defeat brought the disagreements between Lin and Peng into the open. On 16 June, the party leadership reorganised the Northeast Bureau, making Lin its secretary and the commander and political commissar of the Northeast Democratic United Army, with Peng as deputy secretary and deputy political commissar.

In July 1947, Peng left the northeast to attend the National Land Conference at Xibaipo, Pingshan County, Hebei. He then remained in Hebei as a member of the standing committee of the party's Central Working Committee, directing its work in the Jin-Cha-Ji region. In 1948, he again became head of the Organization Department and also head of the party's policy research office, and on 13 December, he was appointed secretary of the CCP's Beiping committee to prepare for the takeover of the city.

After the peaceful handover of Beiping in January 1949, Peng took charge of the city as party secretary. He oversaw the rebuilding of its political institutions, the protection and restoration of its industry, the development of culture and education, and the training of cadres for other parts of the country. In September, he attended the first plenary session of the Chinese People's Political Consultative Conference (CPPCC) and was elected a member of its national committee and of the Central People's Government Council.

=== Early People's Republic ===
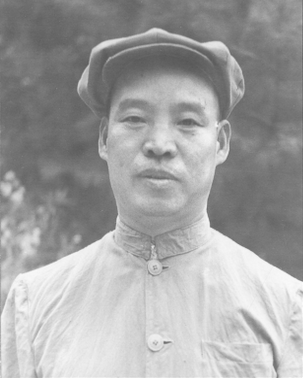
Peng in 1949, as secretary of the CCP Beiping committee

Peng attended the founding ceremony of the People's Republic of China on 1 October 1949. On 19 October, he became vice-chairman of the Political and Legal Affairs Committee of the Government Administration Council. In November, he was elected chairman of the Beijing People's Consultative Council, and he later headed the party's central political and legal affairs group, assisting the leadership with legal work.

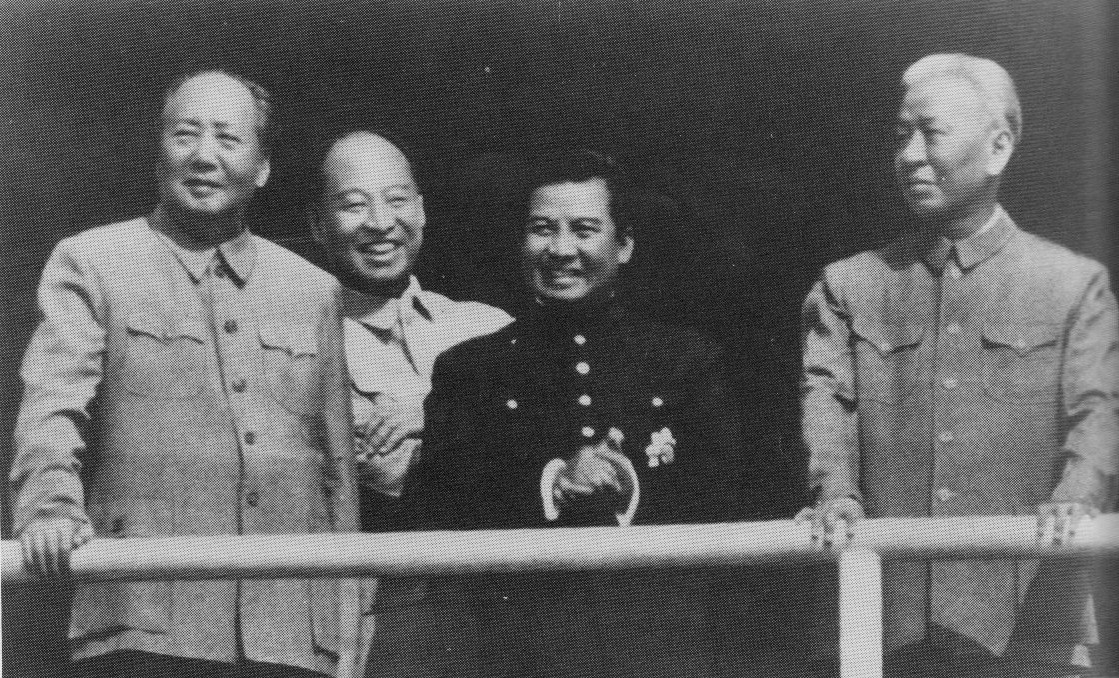
Mao Zedong, Peng, Norodom Sihanouk and Liu Shaoqi on the Tiananmen rostrum in 1965

In February 1950, Peng was elected chairman of the Beijing Federation of Trade Unions, and at the third plenary session of the Seventh Central Committee, he joined the central committee on land reform. In 1951, he became mayor of Beijing, a post to which he was repeatedly re-elected until 1966. As mayor, he oversaw the early campaigns of the People's Republic in the city, including the Three-anti and Five-anti Campaigns, the socialist transformation of industry and commerce, and agricultural collectivisation. In March 1953, as secretary of the party group of the Political and Legal Affairs Committee, he oversaw a report on political and legal work that proposed building a socialist legal system. In December 1953, he oversaw a draft plan for the reconstruction and expansion of Beijing and began work on the capital's construction, the widening of its streets and public security; the planning process involved consultation with experts, including the architect Liang Sicheng. The period saw substantial changes in Beijing's industry and municipal infrastructure.

In 1954, Peng was elected a deputy to the First National People's Congress (NPC), and in September, he spoke at its first session during the debate on the draft constitution. In December 1954, he became a vice-chairman of the CPPCC, and in 1955, he became first secretary of the CCP's Beijing committee, in charge of both the party and the government of the capital.

Peng was also responsible for much of the legislative work of the early People's Republic. In July 1956, he chaired the first meeting of the CCP's central legal committee, which discussed the drafting of a criminal law and a criminal procedure law. At the Eighth Party Congress in September 1956, he was re-elected to the Central Committee, and at its first plenary session, he was elected to the Politburo and the Secretariat, where he assisted Deng Xiaoping, the general secretary, and was responsible for united front work, legal affairs, and Hong Kong and Macau. From November 1956 to February 1957, he led an NPC delegation to the Soviet Union, Czechoslovakia, Romania, Bulgaria, Albania and Yugoslavia. In June 1958, he became head of the central political and legal affairs group, which reported directly to the Politburo and the Secretariat, and from September to November, he worked on the planning of Tiananmen Square and the design of the Great Hall of the People. In April 1959, he was elected vice-chairman and secretary-general of the NPC Standing Committee and a vice-chairman of the CPPCC. In June 1960, while leading the CCP delegation to a conference of communist and workers' parties in Bucharest, he clashed with the Soviet leader Nikita Khrushchev.

In 1961, Peng and Deng Xiaoping organised five investigation teams to examine the effects of the Three Red Banners and the famine in the rural counties of Shunyi and Huairou, near Beijing. At the Seven Thousand Cadres Conference in January 1962, which reviewed the failures of the Great Leap Forward, Peng said that "Chairman Mao is not free from mistakes either". According to the writer Ding Kaiwen, Mao made a self-criticism at the conference but became wary of Liu Shaoqi, Deng Xiaoping and Peng.

From 6 to 20 July 1963, Peng was deputy head of a CCP delegation, led by Deng Xiaoping and including Kang Sheng, that held nine rounds of talks in Moscow with a Soviet delegation led by Mikhail Suslov and including Boris Ponomarev and Yuri Andropov on disputes in the international communist movement. On 14 July, the Soviet side published an open letter to its party members over the CCP's objections, and relations between the two parties deteriorated further.

In July 1964, the Secretariat set up the Five-Person Group on the Cultural Revolution, with Peng, nominated by Mao, as its head, to implement the party's directives on literature, art, philosophy and the social sciences. He was re-elected vice-chairman of the NPC Standing Committee and of the CPPCC at sessions held from December 1964 to January 1965. According to Weng Yanqing, at a central work conference in Beijing during this period, Mao remarked that there were two "independent kingdoms" in Beijing.

=== Cultural Revolution ===
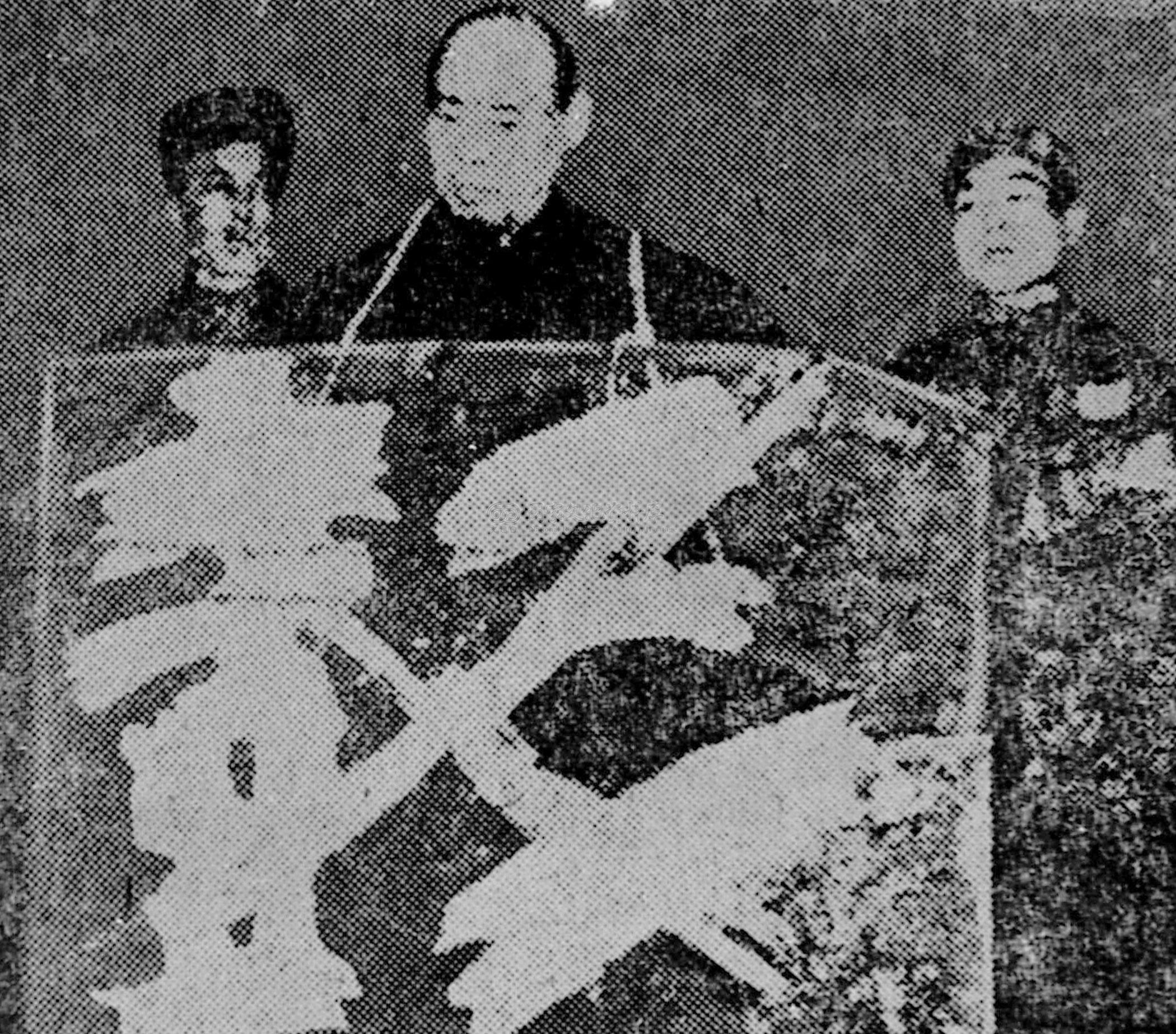
Peng at a struggle session held by Red Guards

In November 1965, the Shanghai newspaper Wenhui Bao published Yao Wenyuan's article criticising the historical play Hai Rui Dismissed from Office, an attack on its author, the deputy mayor of Beijing Wu Han. The article was instigated by Jiang Qing (or, according to some accounts, by Mao himself), and Peng opposed it. On 3 February 1966, he convened an enlarged meeting of the Five-Person Group, which drew up the "Outline Report on the Current Academic Discussion", known as the February Outline. The outline held that academic questions should be kept separate from political ones and opposed linking Wu Han to the Lushan Conference of 1959. On 5 February, the Politburo Standing Committee, chaired by Liu Shaoqi, approved the outline, and Peng, Lu Dingyi and others flew to Wuhan to report on it to Mao. Peng then drafted, on behalf of the Central Committee, a note forwarding the outline, which was circulated to the whole party as a central document after the members of the Standing Committee in Beijing approved it.

The February Outline's opposition to turning academic questions into political ones ran counter to Mao's intentions and to the direction the Cultural Revolution later took. In late March 1966, in conversations with Kang Sheng, Jiang Qing and others, Mao criticised the outline for blurring class lines, ordered it to be withdrawn and said that the Beijing municipal committee was so closed that "not even a needle can be stuck in, not even water can be splashed in" and should be dissolved. The May 16 Notification, drafted by Chen Boda and others, revised by Mao several times and adopted by an enlarged meeting of the Politburo on 16 May, accused Peng of having presented his own views as those of the group without consulting Kang Sheng and its other members. It revoked the February Outline, dissolved the Five-Person Group and replaced it with the Central Cultural Revolution Group. On 18 May, Lin Biao gave a speech warning of the danger of a coup, and Luo Ruiqing, Lu Dingyi and Yang Shangkun, who were connected with Liu Shaoqi and Peng, were removed from their posts.

At the enlarged Politburo meeting held from 4 to 26 May 1966, Peng was criticised, suspended as a secretary of the Secretariat and removed as first secretary of the Beijing committee and as mayor. On 24 May, the Politburo Standing Committee set up a special committee to investigate the "anti-party clique of Peng Zhen, Luo Ruiqing, Lu Dingyi and Yang Shangkun", and Peng was accused of being a spy. In December 1966, he was seized by Red Guards, including Ye Xiangzhen and Liu Shikun, and detained. On 19 May 1975, he was sent from Beijing to Shang County, Shaanxi, where his movements remained restricted. During his detention, his family home in Dieshang was also targeted: his 85-year-old mother and his younger brother died after being subjected to struggle sessions, and his nephew Fu Ruzheng killed himself.

=== Reform era ===
Peng returned to Beijing after the third plenary session of the Eleventh Central Committee ended on 28 December 1978. On 17 February 1979, the Central Committee issued a notice rehabilitating him, which declared that "all the charges imposed on Comrade Peng Zhen and all slanderous and untrue statements" made during the Cultural Revolution were overturned. His experiences during the Cultural Revolution, and the movement's consequences for Chinese politics and society, led him to emphasise the importance of building a legal system. At a session of the NPC Standing Committee held from 17 to 23 February 1979, he was appointed head of its newly established Legislative Affairs Commission. From March to June, he oversaw the revision of the Electoral Law, the Organic Law of Local People's Congresses and Local People's Governments, the Organic Law of the People's Courts and the Organic Law of the People's Procuratorates, and the drafting of the Criminal Law, the Criminal Procedure Law and the Law on Sino-Foreign Equity Joint Ventures.

At the second session of the Fifth NPC in June and July 1979, Peng was elected a vice-chairman of the NPC Standing Committee, and at the fourth plenary session of the Eleventh Central Committee in September, he was restored to the Central Committee and the Politburo. In November, he also became acting secretary-general of the NPC Standing Committee. On 24 January 1980, he became secretary of the Central Political and Legal Affairs Commission. On 17 March 1980, he was appointed head of the committee that directed the trial of the "Lin Biao and Jiang Qing counter-revolutionary cliques".

At the third session of the Fifth NPC in August and September 1980, Peng was appointed vice-chairman of the committee for revising the constitution, and from February to November 1982, he oversaw the drafting of the revised constitution. He was re-elected to the Central Committee at the Twelfth Party Congress in September 1982 and to the Politburo at its first plenary session. On 26 November 1982, he presented the report on the draft constitution, and on 4 December, the NPC adopted the new constitution, which, according to the journalist Zeng Jianhui, restored the constitution as the foundation of social order and the legal system. At the first session of the Sixth NPC in June 1983, Peng succeeded Ye Jianying as Chairman of the NPC Standing Committee.

According to The New York Times, Peng played a leading role in the criticism of the general secretary, Hu Yaobang, at a party "democratic life meeting" in January 1987 that led to Hu's resignation.

=== Retirement and death ===
At the Thirteenth Party Congress in October and November 1987, at which he was a member of the standing committee of the presidium, Peng, then aged 85, retired from the Politburo and the Central Committee along with other veteran leaders. In April 1988, after the first session of the Seventh NPC, he retired as Chairman of the NPC Standing Committee and was succeeded by Wan Li. During the 1989 Tiananmen Square protests, he supported the imposition of martial law and the removal of Zhao Ziyang as general secretary.

Peng died at Beijing Hospital on 26 April 1997, at the age of 94. The obituary issued by the Central Committee, the NPC Standing Committee, the State Council, the CPPCC and the Central Military Commission described him as "a great proletarian revolutionary and statesman" and "a principal founder of China's socialist legal system". After his cremation, his ashes were placed in the Babaoshan Revolutionary Cemetery.

== Political views ==
Reflecting on his career, Peng described China's achievements in building democracy and a legal system as "the result of collective leadership" and summed up his principles in two phrases: "all are equal before the truth" and "all are equal before the law". He held that if both principles were upheld, China's social system, stability, democracy and legal system would continue to develop soundly.

On the question of Mao's historical role, Peng held that the personality cult had arisen from historical circumstances and that responsibility for the Cultural Revolution was collective, and that only legislation and legal constraints could end the defects of "rule by men" in China. In its obituary, The New York Times wrote that Peng had worked closely with the veteran hard-liner Chen Yun to obstruct the economic reforms promoted by Deng in the 1980s, including through his opposition to private property, capitalism and Western culture.

=== Equality before the truth ===
As director of education at the Central Party School, Peng argued in a report on the conduct of the school's discussions that "everyone is equal before the truth", and that comrades should treat their own and others' thoughts and conduct objectively, "judging right as right and wrong as wrong". He held that people should uphold the truth and correct their mistakes regardless of their rank or power. In 1965, at a national conference of provincial culture officials, he criticised attacks in the ideological field and objected to Yao Wenyuan's accusations against Wu Han. Although Mao had suggested that the "crux" of Hai Rui Dismissed from Office was its theme of dismissal from office, linking it to the dismissal of Peng Dehuai, Peng told Mao, "We have investigated and found no organisational connection between Wu Han and Peng Dehuai." According to Liu Zheng, this stance, expressed in the February Outline, made Peng one of the first leaders to be purged in the Cultural Revolution.

=== Equality before the law ===
According to Liu Zheng, Peng was the first CCP leader to set out systematically the principle that all citizens are equal before the law. In a speech at the first session of the First NPC on 17 September 1954, he argued that no one should be allowed to place themselves above the law, a principle that was written into the 1954 constitution and the organic laws of the courts and procuratorates. During the Anti-Rightist Campaign, the principle was condemned as a "bourgeois legal viewpoint", and it was omitted from the constitutions of 1975 and 1978. As head of the NPC's Legislative Affairs Commission from 1979, Peng had it restored in the 1982 constitution and other basic laws, adding a provision that no privileges were to be permitted.

David M. Lampton, then president of the National Committee on United States–China Relations, argued that Peng saw law as an instrument of authoritarian rule, a means of creating predictability while preserving the rule of the Communist Party elite, rather than as something that also constrained that elite.

== Assessment ==
Sympathetic accounts emphasise Peng's generosity, optimism and readiness to forgive, as well as his role in the development of Beijing and the restoration of China's legal system. His tolerant attitude towards intellectuals during his long tenure in Beijing made him popular in literary and artistic circles. When he returned to Beijing in 1979, before his formal rehabilitation, he stayed at the Qianmen Hotel, where visitors reportedly queued for half a month to see him. Although his mother and brother had died during the Cultural Revolution, he did not blame the young people who had denounced him when they came to apologise, saying that "the responsibility does not lie with them".

Critics have focused on his role in the gerontocracy of the Deng Xiaoping era. Because of his conservatism in later life, some writers count him among the "Eight Elders" of that period.

== Personal life ==
Peng met Zhang Jieqing in 1935, shortly after his release from prison, while he was staying in Beiping. The party member Zhang Xiuyan made contact with Peng through Zhang Jieqing, and the two became close before he left for Yan'an. Zhang Jieqing arrived in Yan'an in 1939, and the couple married there that year. Both were imprisoned during the Cultural Revolution. In 1975, they were released from Qincheng Prison and sent to Shangluo, Shaanxi, and they returned to Beijing at the end of 1978.

The couple had three sons and a daughter, and they also adopted a daughter. Their eldest child, Fu Yan, became chair of the Beijing Fuli Company, having earlier served as party secretary and general manager of the China Euro-American Import and Export Corporation. Their eldest son, Fu Rui, was a deputy general manager of the China National Nuclear Corporation; their second son, Fu Yang, became a vice-president of the All China Lawyers Association and director of the Kangda law firm in Beijing; and their third son, Fu Liang, became chair of the Shenzhen Mingshang Golf Club and the Beijing Golden Century Development Company. Their adopted daughter, Liu Chaolan, was the only child of Liu Yichun, who was killed by Yan Xishan's forces during the December Incident; she later became a writer.

== Awards and honors ==
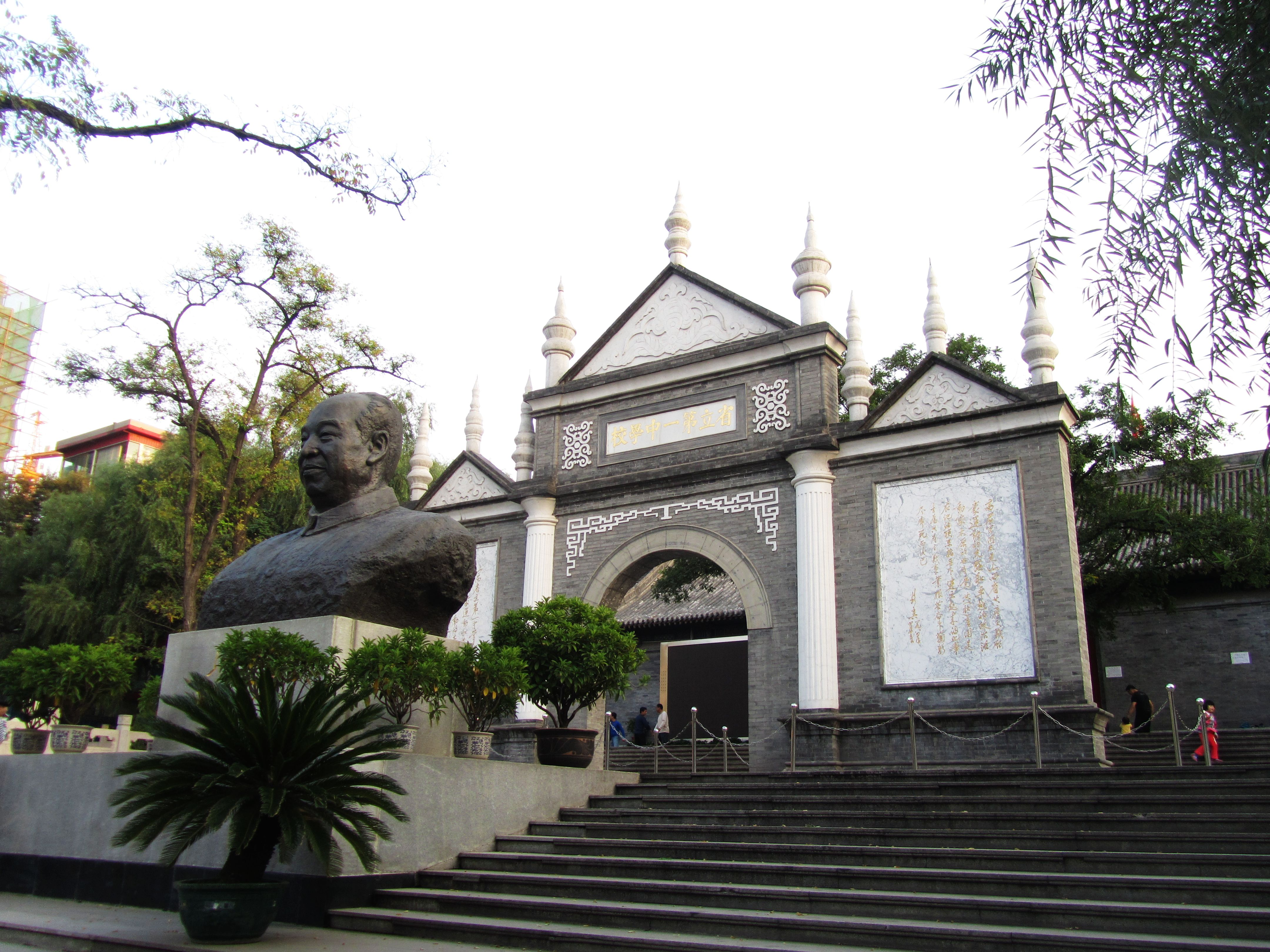
The former Shanxi Provincial No. 1 Middle School in Taiyuan, with a statue of Peng

=== Foreign honours ===
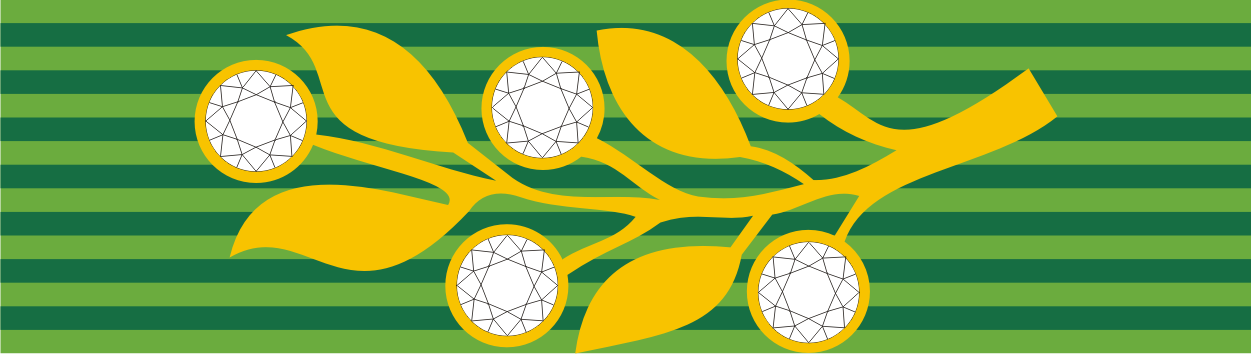
- Grand Cross of the Royal Order of Sowathara (Cambodia, 18 February 1956)
- First Class of Order of the National Flag (North Korea, 2 May 1962)

=== Other honors ===
In October 2002, to mark the centenary of his birth, China Central Television broadcast the 20-episode television series Peng Zhen, produced by the General Office of the NPC Standing Committee and the CCP Beijing Municipal Committee and made by the Beijing Television Art Centre and the August First Film Studio. Directed by Wang Limin and Lin Bing, it starred Wu Weidong and Zhang Yushan as the younger and the older Peng. On 11 October 2002, the Central Committee held a symposium to commemorate the centenary, chaired by the NPC Standing Committee chairman, Li Peng, at which Jiang Zemin spoke. At the same time, a bronze statue of Peng was unveiled at his former home in Dieshang village, Houma, and the memorial hall at the former site of the CCP Taiyuan branch, on the southern shore of Wenying Lake in Taiyuan, was renamed the Memorial Hall of Peng Zhen's Life and the Former Site of the CCP Taiyuan Branch, in recognition of the role of Gao Junyu, Peng and others in establishing the party in Shanxi.

A collection of Peng's articles, telegrams and speeches, Selected Works of Peng Zhen, covering the war against Japan, the civil war, the early People's Republic and the reform era, was published in June 1991. A memorial volume, Remembering Peng Zhen, and a pictorial album, Peng Zhen, were published in April 1998.

== Works ==
- Selected Works of Peng Zhen (People's Publishing House, 1991), containing 90 articles, telegrams and speeches from 1941 to 1990.
- Peng Zhen on Political and Legal Work in New China (Central Party Literature Press, 1992), containing 71 speeches and reports from 1948 to 1990.

Government offices
Preceded by Nie Rongzhen	Mayor of Beijing; 1951–1966	Succeeded by Wu De; Acting
Assembly seats
New title	Secretary-General of the Standing Committee of the National People's Congress; 1954–1965	Succeeded by Liu Ningyi
Preceded by Ji Pengfei	Secretary-General of the Standing Committee of the National People's Congress; 1979–1980	Succeeded by Yang Shangkun
Preceded by Ye Jianying	Chairman of the Standing Committee of the National People's Congress; 1983–1988	Succeeded by Wan Li
Party political offices
Preceded by Chen Yun	Head of the Organization Department of the Chinese Communist Party; Acting from 1944–1945; 1944–1953	Succeeded by Rao Shushi
New title	Party Secretary of Beijing; 1948–1966	Succeeded by Li Xuefeng
New title	Secretary of the Central Political and Legal Affairs Commission; 1980–1982	Succeeded by Chen Pixian
