= Don Edwards =

American politician (1915–2015)

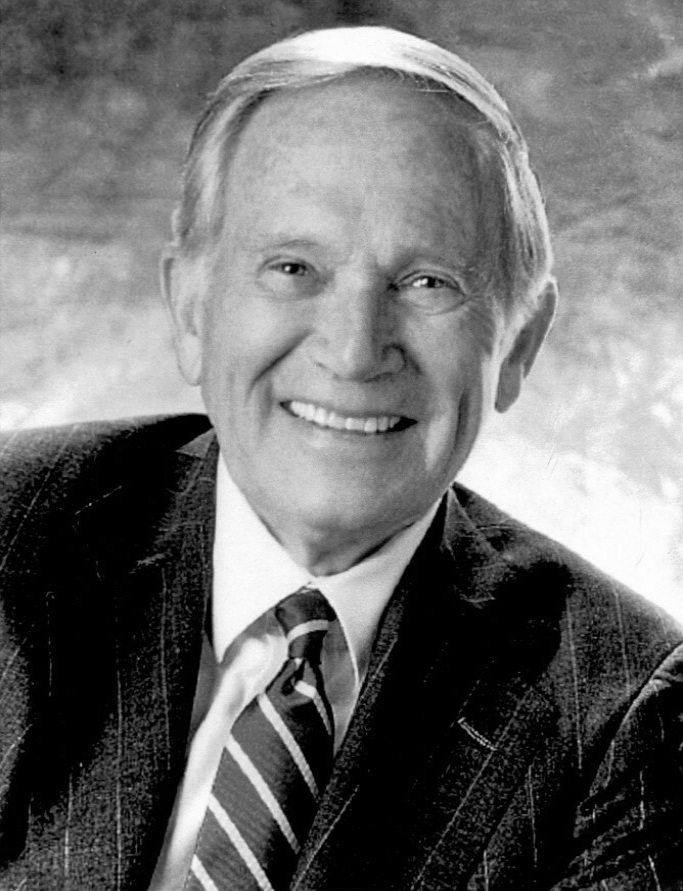
- Official portrait, 1993

Member of the U.S. House of Representatives from California
- In office January 3, 1963 – January 3, 1995
- Preceded by: New district (redistricting)
- Succeeded by: Zoe Lofgren
- Constituency: 9th district (1963–1975); 10th district (1975–1993); 16th district (1993–1995)

Personal details
- Born: William Donlon Edwards; January 6, 1915 San Jose, California, U.S.
- Died: October 1, 2015 (aged 100) Carmel-by-the-Sea, California, U.S.
- Party: Democratic (after 1962)
- Other political affiliations: Republican (before 1962)
- Education: Stanford University; Stanford Law School

Military service
- Allegiance: United States
- Branch/service: United States Navy
- Battles/wars: World War II
- Don Edwards's voice Don Edwards speaks in support of FY1990 appropriations to improve exports Recorded July 11, 1989

William Donlon Edwards (January 6, 1915 – October 1, 2015) was an American politician of the Democratic Party and a member of the United States House of Representatives from California for 32 years in the late 20th century.

== Early life ==
Edwards was born in San Jose, California to Republican parents. His father and grandfather owned a land title business. After graduating from San Jose High School, Edwards earned a B.A. from Stanford University in 1936, where he was member of the Stanford golf team. Edwards then attended Stanford Law School and was admitted to the bar in 1940.

Edwards was a special agent for the Federal Bureau of Investigation from 1940 to 1941, when he joined the United States Navy as a naval intelligence and gunnery officer during World War II. In 1950, he was elected president of the California Young Republicans, resigning after joining the United World Federalists. Perceiving the Republican Party as becoming too conservative, he became a Democrat prior to his first congressional election victory in 1962. He was the president of Valley Title Company of Santa Clara County from 1951 to 1975, and a delegate to the Democratic National Conventions of 1964 and 1968.

== United States representative (1963–95) ==
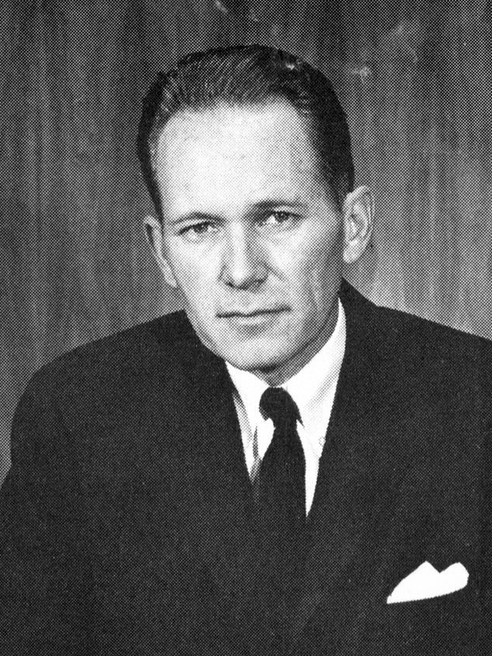
Edwards in 1962, during his first campaign for U.S. Congress.

Edwards was elected as a member of the Democratic Party to the 88th from the 9th Congressional District (later redistricted to the 10th and then the 16th Congressional District) and to the fifteen succeeding Congresses (January 3, 1963 – January 3, 1995). In his first year in the House, Edwards voted to abolish the House Un-American Activities Committee. Edwards was involved in the passage of the Civil Rights Act of 1964 and the Voting Rights Act of 1965. Edwards was a member of the House Judiciary Committee during the investigation of the Watergate scandal. Edwards opposed the U.S. military involvement in the Vietnam War, the invasion of Panama, and the Persian Gulf War.

Edwards was one of eight members of the Judiciary Committee to vote for all five articles of impeachment drafted against President Richard Nixon during the Watergate scandal. The others were Jack Brooks, Robert Kastenmeier, John Conyers, Barbara Jordan, Charles Rangel, Elizabeth Holtzman and Edward Mezvinsky. Three of the five articles were adopted prior to Nixon's resignation on August 9, 1974.

Edwards was one of the House impeachment managers appointed by the House of Representatives in 1988 to conduct the impeachment trial of Alcee Hastings, judge of the United States District Court for the Southern District of Florida. However, he was replaced as an impeachment manager before the trial started. However, in 1989, he was appointed and served as a House impeachment manager in the impeachment trial of Walter Nixon, judge of the United States District Court for the Southern District of Mississippi. Edwards was the chairman of the House Subcommittee on Civil Liberties and Civil Rights for 23 years. Edwards was not a candidate for reelection to the 104th Congress. Santa Clara County Supervisor Zoe Lofgren, one of his former aides, won a crowded Democratic primary for the seat and still holds it today.

== Personal life and death ==
Don Edwards was married three times; he was married to Edith Wilkie Edwards from 1981 until her death in 2011. He turned 100 in January 2015. He died later that year on October 1, 2015. He was remembered by media outlets as, "a champion of civil and constitutional rights during his three decades on Capitol Hill" and someone who "stood up for women, for workers, for the environment."

== Legacy ==
Edwards received the Congressional Distinguished Service Award in 2003. The Don Edwards San Francisco Bay National Wildlife Refuge in the south end of San Francisco Bay is named in his honor.

== Electoral history ==
Don Edwards electoral history

United States House of Representatives elections, 1962
Party	Candidate	Votes	%
Democratic	Don Edwards	79,616	66
Republican	Joseph F. Donovan	41,104	34
Total votes		120,720	100
Turnout			
Democratic win (new seat)			

United States House of Representatives elections, 1964
Party	Candidate	Votes	%
Democratic	Don Edwards (incumbent)	115,954	69.8
Republican	Joseph F. Donovan	50,261	30.2
Total votes		166,215	100.0
Turnout			
Democratic hold			

United States House of Representatives elections, 1966
Party	Candidate	Votes	%
Democratic	Don Edwards (incumbent)	97,311	63.2
Republican	Wilbur G. Durkee	56,784	36.8
Total votes		154,095	100.0
Turnout			
Democratic hold			

United States House of Representatives elections, 1968
Party	Candidate	Votes	%
Democratic	Don Edwards (incumbent)	100,891	56.5
Republican	Larry Fargher	77,521	43.5
Total votes		178,412	100.0
Turnout			
Democratic hold			

United States House of Representatives elections, 1970
Party	Candidate	Votes	%
Democratic	Don Edwards (incumbent)	120,041	69.1
Republican	Mark Guerra	49,556	28.5
American Independent	Edmon V. Kaiser	4,009	2.3
Total votes		173,606	100.0
Turnout			
Democratic hold			

United States House of Representatives elections, 1972
Party	Candidate	Votes	%
Democratic	Don Edwards (incumbent)	123,837	72.3
Republican	Herb Smith	43,134	25.2
American Independent	Edmon V. Kaiser	4,403	2.5
Total votes		171,374	100
Turnout			
Democratic hold			

1974 United States House of Representatives elections
Party	Candidate	Votes	%
Democratic	Don Edwards (Incumbent)	86,014	77.0
Republican	Herb Smith	25,678	23.0
Total votes		111,692	100
Turnout			
Democratic gain from Republican			

1976 United States House of Representatives elections
Party	Candidate	Votes	%
Democratic	Don Edwards (Incumbent)	111,992	72.0
Republican	Herb Smith	38,088	24.5
American Independent	Edmon V. Kaiser	5,363	3.5
Total votes		155,443	100.0
Turnout			
Democratic hold			

1978 United States House of Representatives elections
Party	Candidate	Votes	%
Democratic	Don Edwards (Incumbent)	84,488	67.1
Republican	Rudy Hansen	41,374	32.9
Total votes		125,862	100.0
Turnout			
Democratic hold			

1980 United States House of Representatives elections
Party	Candidate	Votes	%
Democratic	Don Edwards (Incumbent)	102,231	62.1
Republican	Joseph M. Lutton	45,987	27.9
Libertarian	Joseph Fuhrig	11,904	7.2
American Independent	Edmon V. Kaiser	4,421	2.7
Total votes		164,543	100.0
Turnout			
Democratic hold			

1982 United States House of Representatives elections
Party	Candidate	Votes	%
Democratic	Don Edwards (Incumbent)	77,263	62.7
Republican	Bob Herriott	41,506	33.7
Libertarian	Dale Burrow	2,403	1.9
American Independent	Edmon V. Kaiser	2,109	1.7
Total votes		123,281	100.0
Turnout			
Democratic hold			

1984 United States House of Representatives elections
Party	Candidate	Votes	%
Democratic	Don Edwards (Incumbent)	102,469	62.4
Republican	Bob Herriott	56,256	34.3
Libertarian	Perr Cardestam	2,789	1.7
American Independent	Edmon V. Kaiser	2,663	1.6
Total votes		164,177	100.0
Turnout			
Democratic hold			

1986 United States House of Representatives elections
Party	Candidate	Votes	%
Democratic	Don Edwards (Incumbent)	84,240	70.5
Republican	Michael R. La Crone	31,826	26.6
Libertarian	Perr Cardestam	1,797	1.5
Peace and Freedom	Bradley L. Mayer	1,701	1.4
Total votes		119,564	100.0
Turnout			
Democratic hold			

1988 United States House of Representatives elections
Party	Candidate	Votes	%
Democratic	Don Edwards (Incumbent)	142,500	86.2
Libertarian	Kennita Watson	22,801	13.8
Total votes		165,301	100.0
Turnout			
Democratic hold			

1990 United States House of Representatives elections
Party	Candidate	Votes	%
Democratic	Don Edwards (Incumbent)	81,875	62.7
Republican	Mark Patrosso	48,747	37.3
No party	James (write-in)	15	0.0
Total votes		130,637	100.0
Turnout			
Democratic hold			

1992 United States House of Representatives elections in California
Party	Candidate	Votes	%
Democratic	Don Edwards (incumbent)	96,661	62
Republican	Ted Bundesen	49,843	32
Peace and Freedom	Amani S. Kummba	9,370	6
No party	Hunt (write-in)	5	0
No party	Loeber (write-in)	3	0
No party	James (write-in)	1	0
Total votes		155,883	100.0
Turnout			
Democratic hold			

== See also ==
- List of centenarians (politicians and civil servants)

U.S. House of Representatives
Preceded by J. Arthur Younger	Member of the U.S. House of Representatives from California's 9th congressional district 1963–1975	Succeeded by Pete Stark
Preceded by Charles S. Gubser	Member of the U.S. House of Representatives from California's 10th congressional district 1975–1993	Succeeded by William P. Baker
Preceded by Leon Panetta	Member of the U.S. House of Representatives from California's 16th congressional district 1993–1995	Succeeded by Zoe Lofgren
