= Gustavo García de Paredes =

Panamanian educator and politician (1938–2024)

Rector of the University of Panama
- In office 1997–2016

Ambassador of Panama to Brazil
- In office 1983–1988

Minister of Education of Panama
- In office 1978–1981
- Preceded by: ?
- Succeeded by: Susana Richa

Personal details
- Born: 23 September 1938 Tripoli, Lebanon
- Died: 6 September 2024 (aged 85)
- Party: Democratic Revolutionary Party
- Education: University of Madrid

Gustavo García de Paredes Aued (23 September 1938 – 6 September 2024) was a Panamanian educator, historian, philosopher, and politician. He was the rector of the University of Panama for five consecutive terms: 1994–1997, 1997–2000, 2003–2005, 2006–2011, and 2012–2016. García also served as the Minister of Education of Panama from 1978 until 1981, manager of the Colón Free Trade Zone from 1981 to 1982, and Ambassador to Brazil from 1983 to 1988.

== Biography ==
García was born in Tripoli, modern-day Lebanon, on 23 September 1938. He received a bachelor's degree in philosophy with a specialization in universal history from the University of Madrid in 1962. Garcia then completed his doctorate of philosophy, also from the University of Madrid in 1962.

In 1998, García announced his candidacy for President of Panama in the forthcoming 1999 Panamanian general election, but lost the Democratic Revolutionary Party's (PRD) nomination to Martín Torrijos. García received only 1,498 votes in the PRD's presidential primary election against Torrijos.

García de Paredes died on 6 September 2024, at the age of 85.

== Awards and decorations ==
- Civil Order of Alfonso X, the Wise, Spain, 1979
- Order of Andrés Bello, Venezuela
- Order of the Southern Cross, Brazil
- Order of Bernardo O'Higgins, Chile
- Grade Officer of the Order of Vasco Núñez de Balboa, Panama
- Keys to the city of Panama City
