= Joaquín López Menéndez =

Spanish engineer and politician (1939–2019)

Joaquín López Menéndez (1939 – 21 April 2019) was a Spanish engineer and politician who was the mayor of A Coruña in Galicia from 1981 to 1983.

== Biography ==
Born in A Coruña, he received a baccalaureate from the Salesians before completing his course in highway engineering in Madrid. He then practiced his profession in Norway for three years.

After returning to Spain, López Menéndez worked as the Provincial Deputation's head of roads and works. In 1977, he joined the Galician Independent Party, which was absorbed into the Union of the Democratic Centre (UCD). He ran in A Coruña in the first democratic local elections in 1979, in which he emphasised his background in urban planning, and lost to Galician nationalist Domingos Merino.

In 1981, a vote of no confidence in Merino installed López Menéndez as mayor. During his time in office, he campaigned for A Coruña to be Galicia's capital, though he did not want the Parliament of Galicia to leave its seat in Santiago de Compostela. He declared three days of official mourning and a protest on 6 June 1982 to achieve his aim, gathering 15,000 people. In the same year, he approved of remodelling of the city's Estadio Riazor for the 1982 FIFA World Cup.

A Coruña's UCD branch removed López Menéndez from the party in late 1982 and called for him to resign, though the city council voted to keep him in office. In the 1983 local elections, his United A Coruña party took only four seats as Francisco Vázquez Vázquez of the Spanish Socialist Workers' Party (PSOE) succeeded him as mayor. After one term with his new party, he left politics and no longer spoke on the subject, apart from to affirm his support for his successors as mayor.

López Menéndez died at home at the age of 79 or 80. Colleagues of all parties attended his funeral at the San Nicolás church and his burial at the San Julián de Serantes cemetery.
