= David Driessen =

Dutch football player

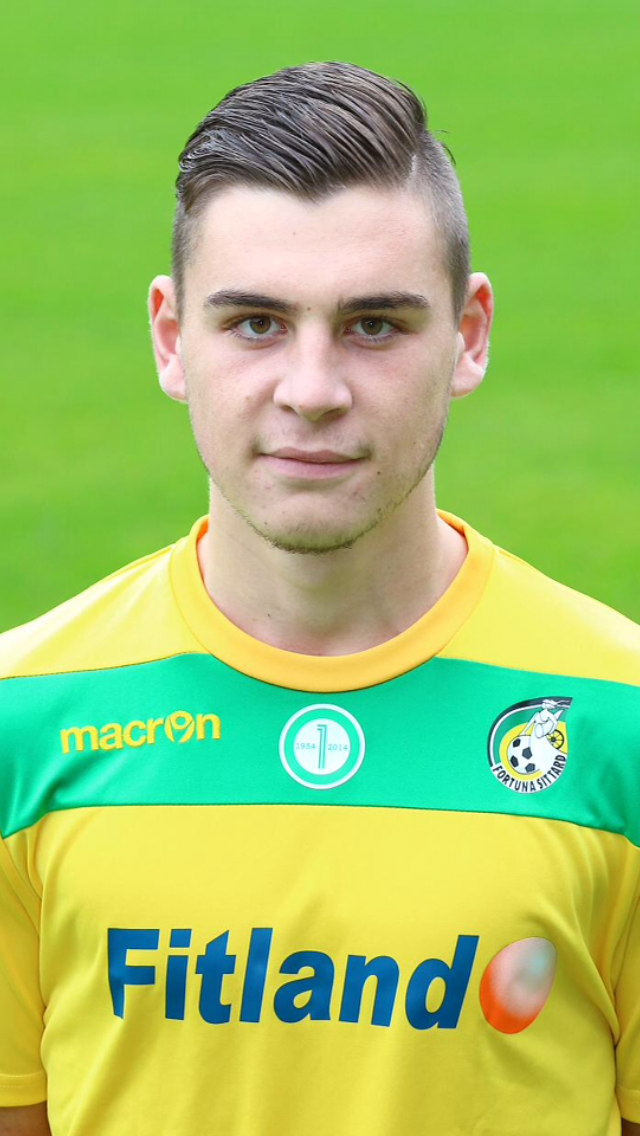

Personal information
- Date of birth: 24 November 1994 (age 31)
- Place of birth: Venlo, Netherlands
- Position: Forward

Team information
- Current team: Venlosche Boys

Youth career
- –2012: Venlosche Boys
- 2012–2014: Fortuna Sittard

Senior career*
| Years | Team | Apps | (Gls) |
| 2014–2015 | Jong Fortuna Sittard | 17 | (1) |
| 2015–2017 | Jong Achilles '29 | 17 | (3) |
| 2017 | Achilles '29 | 1 | (0) |
| 2017- | Venlosche Boys | | |
- * Club domestic league appearances and goals as of 27 May 2017

David Driessen (born 24 November 1994) is a Dutch football player.

== Club career ==
He made his professional debut in the Eerste Divisie for Achilles '29 on 13 January 2017 in a game against Fortuna Sittard.
