= Carlo Cottone =

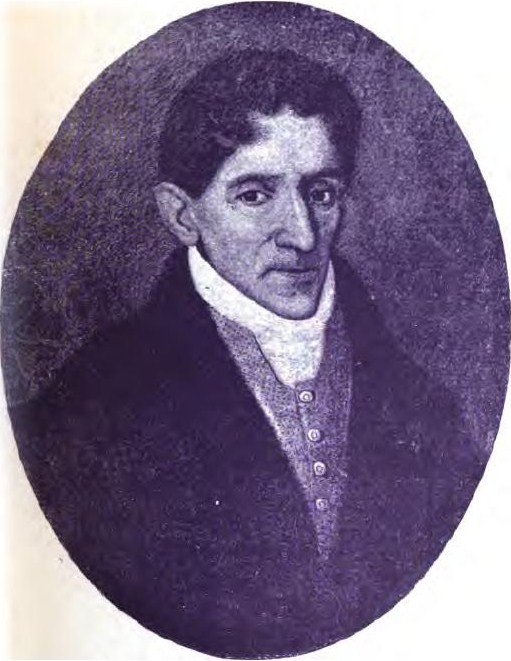
- Born: 30 September 1756; Palermo, Kingdom of Sicily
- Died: 24 December 1829 (aged 73); Palermo, Kingdom of Two Sicilies
- Occupation: politician
- Known for: Sicilian Constitution of 1812

Carlo Cottone, prince of Castelnuovo, (Palermo, 30 September 1756 – Palermo, 24 December 1829) was a Sicilian politician, known as one of the main advocates of the Sicilian Constitution of 1812.
