= Mohan Lal Chakma =

Indian politician

Member of Tripura Legislative Assembly
- In office 1977–1983
- Succeeded by: Ratna Prava Das
- Constituency: Pencharthal

Personal details
- Born: 1912 Mogchan, Chittagong Hill Tracts, British India
- Died: 21 June 2013 (aged 100–101) Dhanicherra, Tripura, India
- Party: Communist Party of India (Marxist)

Mohan Lal Chakma (c. 1912 – 21 June 2013) was an Indian politician. He was MLA for Penchartal, Tripura (1978–83).

== Life ==
Chakma was born at Mogchan village in the Chittagong Hill Tracts. He worked as a school teacher in the Rangamati district and in 1947 fought for the inclusion of the hill tracts with India during the partition. Due to his political activities, the then East Pakistan authorities issued an arrest warrant against him; due to this he fled to Tripura in India.

He died on 21 June 2013 at the age of 101.
