= Donald Naddy =

Member of the South Dakota House of Representatives

Member of the South Dakota House of Representatives from the 34th district
- In office 1959–1966

Personal details
- Born: January 12, 1917 Kidder, South Dakota
- Died: February 2017 (aged 100) Port Angeles, Washington
- Party: Democratic
- Education: Northern State University
- Occupation: teacher

Donald William Naddy (January 12, 1917 – February 2017) was an American politician in the state of South Dakota who was a member of the South Dakota House of Representatives from 1959 to 1966. Naddy was an alumnus of the Northern State University and a teacher. He also was a town clerk of Britton, South Dakota. He died aged 100 in 2017.
