= Wilma Driessen =

Dutch opera singer

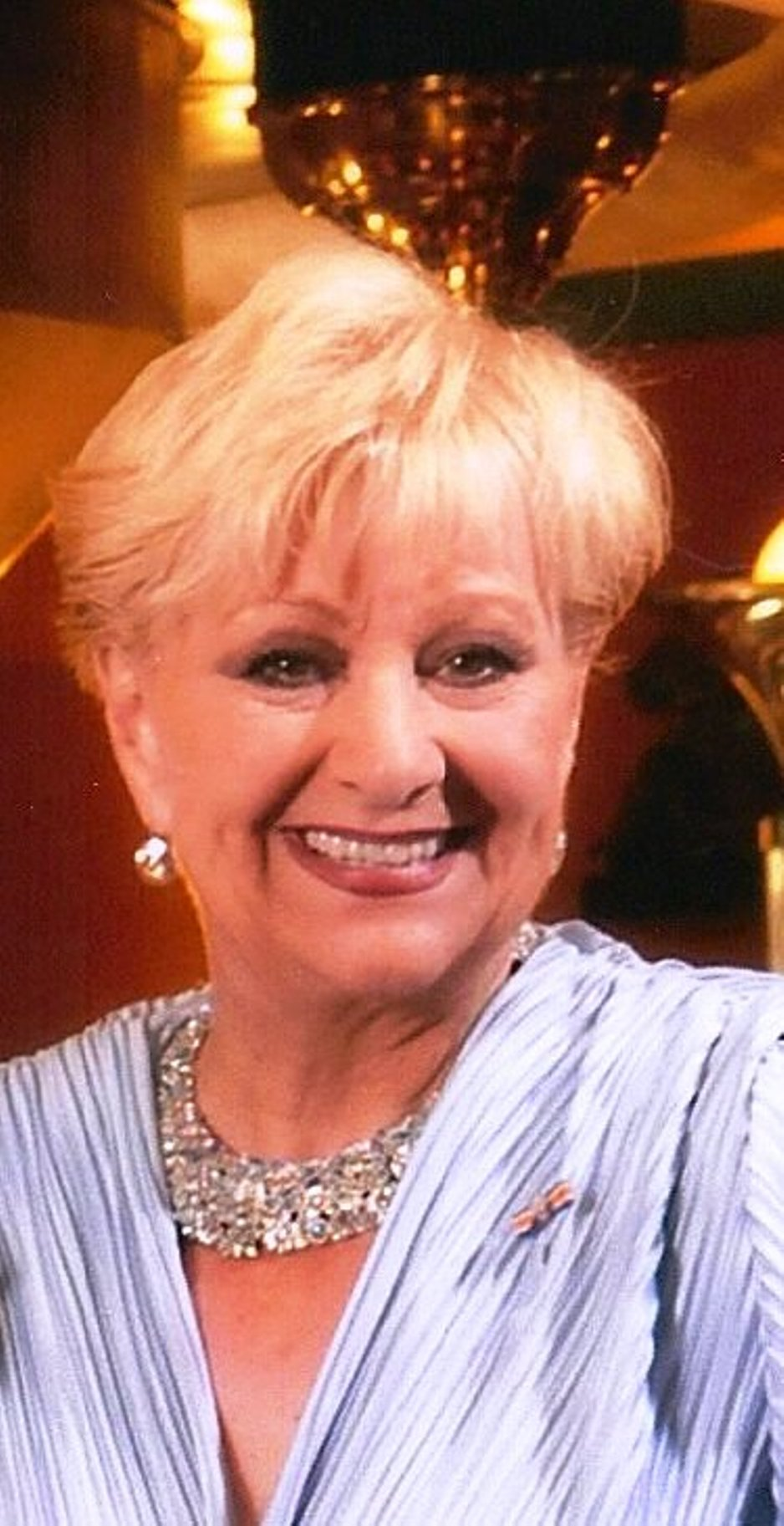
Wilma Driessen

Wilma Driessen (born Wilhelmina Jacoba Driessen; December 6, 1938) is a Dutch operatic coloratura soprano. She is known for her versatility and extraordinary vocal expression.

== Child prodigy ==
Dutch-born Driessen started performing as a child prodigy at the age of only seven. At the age of fourteen she gave her first radio recital, with songs by Max Reger and Johannes Brahms. At the age of ten she started her study singing and music at the Royal Conservatory of The Hague. Later she studied at the Mozarteum in Salzburg, Austria.

== Career ==
In 1959, at the age of 20, Driessen made her debut in the title role of Lakmé by Léo Delibes at the Vlaamse Opera in Ghent and the Opéra Royal de Wallonie in Liège. She made her Dutch debut at the De Nederlandse Opera (DNO) in Amsterdam as Leïla in Bizet's Les pêcheurs de perles, and was then engaged at the house as the first coloratura soprano.

Over the following years, she sang all main roles of her voice type at the great opera houses of Europe. Later in her career she added to her repertoire classical operetta and musical. She made much furor as Gilda in Verdi's Rigoletto, Olympia in Offenbach's Les contes d'Hoffmann, and Adele in Die Fledermaus by Johann Strauss.

Her extensive opera, operetta and musical repertoire consists of more than 70 leading roles. She was a frequent guest at many festivals and television programs. She has worked - among others - with Igor Stravinsky, Carlo Maria Giulini, Roberto Benzi, Bruno Maderna, Robert Stolz, Elisabeth Schwarzkopf, Rudolf Schock and Arnold van Mill. She recorded several records and CDs.

== Versatility ==
In addition to her singing career, Driessen was one of the first Dutch classical singers who regularly performed with singers and artists from the popular genre. The many television and radio broadcasts makes this versatile singer very popular with a broad audience. Her impressive professional career spans a period of more than 50 years.

== Family ==
Driessen is the widow of Richard E. Gerritsen, artisan of Oud Campen and Soelekerke, who died in 2016 at the age of 81. She has a son Marco R. Gerritsen.

== Honours ==
- Laureate International Vocal Competition 's-Hertogenbosch (1959)
- Laureate Concorso Lirico Internazionale Voci Verdiane di Busseto (1963)
- Knight of the Order of Orange-Nassau (1990)

== External ==
- Wilma Driessen website
- Wilma Driessen at AllMusic
