= Pencharthal Assembly constituency =

Legislative Assembly constituency in Tripura State, India

Coordinates: 24.19°N 92.1°E

Pencharthal
- Constituency No. 59 for the Tripura Legislative Assembly

Constituency details
- Country: India
- Region: Northeast India
- State: Tripura
- District: North Tripura
- Lok Sabha constituency: Tripura East
- Established: 1977
- Total electors: 45,670
- Reservation: ST

Member of Legislative Assembly
- 13th Tripura Legislative Assembly
- Incumbent Santana Chakma
- Party: Bharatiya Janata Party
- Elected year: 2023

Pencharthal is one of the 60 Legislative Assembly constituencies of Tripura state in India.

It is part of North Tripura district and is reserved for candidates belonging to the Scheduled Tribes.

== Members of the Legislative Assembly ==
Election	Member	Party
1977	Mohan Lal Chakma	Communist Party of India
1983	Ratna Prava Das	Independent politician
1988	Sushil Kumar Chakma	Indian National Congress
1993	Anil Chakma	Communist Party of India
1998	Anil Chakma	Communist Party of India
2003	Arun Kumar Chakma	Communist Party of India
2008	Arun Kumar Chakma	Communist Party of India
2013	Arun Kumar Chakma	Communist Party of India
2018	Santana Chakma	Bharatiya Janata Party
2023	Santana Chakma	Bharatiya Janata Party

== Election results ==
=== 2023 Assembly election ===
2023 Tripura Legislative Assembly election: Pencharthal
Party	Candidate	Votes	%	±%
BJP	Santana Chakma	17,781	45.50	▼3.88
CPI(M)	Sadhan Kumar Chakma	9,808	25.10	▼20.46
TMP	Hollywood Chakma	9,644	24.68	New
AITC	Purnita Chakma	767	1.96	New
Independent	Karnadhan Chakma	551	1.41	New
NOTA	None of the Above	527	1.35	▲0.22
Margin of victory		7,973	20.40	▲16.58
Turnout		39,078	85.61	▼3.75
Registered electors		45,670		▲13.53
BJP hold		Swing	▼3.88	

=== 2018 Assembly election ===
2018 Tripura Legislative Assembly election: Pencharthal
Party	Candidate	Votes	%	±%
BJP	Santana Chakma	17,743	49.38	▲47.20
CPI(M)	Anil Chakma	16,370	45.56	▼4.90
INC	Nandini Chakma	644	1.79	▼45.57
NOTA	None of the Above	407	1.13	New
AMB	Karnadhan Chakma	223	0.62	New
Tipraland State Party	Kripamohan Reang	209	0.58	New
INPT	Daniel Sangma	187	0.52	New
Margin of victory		1,373	3.82	▲0.73
Turnout		35,930	89.05	▼2.01
Registered electors		40,227		▲11.66
BJP gain from CPI(M)		Swing	▼1.07	

=== 2013 Assembly election ===
2013 Tripura Legislative Assembly election: Pencharthal
Party	Candidate	Votes	%	±%
CPI(M)	Arun Kumar Chakma	16,601	50.46	▼0.09
INC	Purnita Chakma	15,584	47.36	▲4.90
BJP	Krishna Chakma	717	2.18	▲0.52
Margin of victory		1,017	3.09	▼4.99
Turnout		32,902	91.41	▲1.55
Registered electors		36,025		
CPI(M) hold		Swing		

=== 2008 Assembly election ===
2008 Tripura Legislative Assembly election: Pencharthal
Party	Candidate	Votes	%	±%
CPI(M)	Arun Kumar Chakma	17,210	50.54	▲2.04
INC	Sushil Kumar Chakma	14,460	42.47	▲1.78
Independent	Binoy Reang	804	2.36	New
BJP	Manishankar Chakma	566	1.66	New
AMB	Karnadhan Chakma	402	1.18	▼8.22
AIFB	Jainaham Reang	328	0.96	New
CPI(ML)L	Basirun Reang	279	0.82	New
Margin of victory		2,750	8.08	▲0.26
Turnout		34,049	89.79	▲18.30
Registered electors		37,926		
CPI(M) hold		Swing	▲2.04	

=== 2003 Assembly election ===
2003 Tripura Legislative Assembly election: Pencharthal
Party	Candidate	Votes	%	±%
CPI(M)	Arun Kumar Chakma	12,863	48.51	▲0.33
INC	Nirupama Chakma	10,790	40.69	▲2.41
AMB	Karnadhan Chakma	2,494	9.41	▲8.03
NCP	Gnana Bikash Chakma	370	1.40	New
Margin of victory		2,073	7.82	▼2.08
Turnout		26,517	71.49	▼1.18
Registered electors		37,100		▲15.36
CPI(M) hold		Swing	▲0.33	

=== 1998 Assembly election ===
1998 Tripura Legislative Assembly election: Pencharthal
Party	Candidate	Votes	%	±%
CPI(M)	Anil Chakma	11,257	48.18	▲6.42
INC	Nirupama Chakma	8,944	38.28	▲14.54
BJP	Krishna Chandra Chakma	2,843	12.17	▲10.64
AMB	Priya Bikash Chakma	322	1.38	▼18.85
Margin of victory		2,313	9.90	▼8.12
Turnout		23,366	74.43	▲0.38
Registered electors		32,160		▲7.97
CPI(M) hold		Swing	▲6.42	

=== 1993 Assembly election ===
1993 Tripura Legislative Assembly election: Pencharthal
Party	Candidate	Votes	%	±%
CPI(M)	Anil Chakma	8,990	41.76	▲7.74
INC	Sushil Kumar Chakma	5,110	23.74	▼19.77
AMB	Santiswar Barua	4,354	20.22	New
Independent	Krishna Chakma	2,316	10.76	New
BJP	Parimal Chakma	328	1.52	▲0.10
Independent	Nripendra Chakma	162	0.75	New
Independent	Bipin Talukdar	146	0.68	New
Margin of victory		3,880	18.02	▲8.53
Turnout		21,528	73.35	▼6.20
Registered electors		29,787		▲21.82
CPI(M) gain from INC		Swing	▼1.75	

=== 1988 Assembly election ===
1988 Tripura Legislative Assembly election: Pencharthal
Party	Candidate	Votes	%	±%
INC	Sushil Kumar Chakma	8,348	43.51	New
CPI(M)	Malendhan Chakma	6,527	34.02	▲1.41
Independent	Minati Rao	4,040	21.05	New
BJP	Chakrabam Reang	273	1.42	New
Margin of victory		1,821	9.49	▲7.25
Turnout		19,188	79.89	▲1.93
Registered electors		24,451		▲22.04
INC gain from Independent		Swing	▲8.67	

=== 1983 Assembly election ===
1983 Tripura Legislative Assembly election: Pencharthal
Party	Candidate	Votes	%	±%
Independent	Ratna Prava Das	5,343	34.84	New
CPI(M)	Mohan Lal Chakma	5,000	32.60	▼9.87
TUS	Temiya Kumar Dewan	4,993	32.56	▲18.97
Margin of victory		343	2.24	▼14.93
Turnout		15,336	77.93	▲7.72
Registered electors		20,035		▲17.67
Independent gain from CPI(M)		Swing		

=== 1977 Assembly election ===
1977 Tripura Legislative Assembly election: Pencharthal
Party	Candidate	Votes	%	±%
CPI(M)	Mohan Lal Chakma	4,977	42.47	New
INC	Sushil Kumar Chakma	2,966	25.31	New
TUS	Baiksanga Darlong	1,592	13.59	New
JP	Hangshadwaj Dewan	1,343	11.46	New
TPCC	Bharati Nandan Malchai Chowdhury	840	7.17	New
Margin of victory		2,011	17.16	
Turnout		11,718	70.29	
Registered electors		17,026		
CPI(M) win (new seat)				

== See also ==
- List of constituencies of the Tripura Legislative Assembly
- North Tripura district
