= Zhang Jieqing =

Chinese politician and writer

- 张洁清
- Born: 12 October 1912; Ba County, Hebei, China (now Bazhou, Hebei, China)
- Died: 26 May 2015 (aged 102); Beijing, China
- Occupations: Politician, writer
- Political party: Chinese Communist Party
- Spouse: Peng Zhen (m. 1939; died 1997)
- Children: 5 (1 adopted)

Zhang Jieqing (Chinese: 张洁清; pinyin: Zhāng Jiéqīng; Wade–Giles: Chang Chiehch'ing^{1}, 12 October 1912 – 27 May 2015) was a Chinese politician and writer, as well as a member of the Chinese Communist Party. In 1933, Zhang Jieqing was arrested by the Kuomintang, spending several months in jail. After that she graduated from Beijing Normal University. During the Cultural Revolution, she suffered political persecution and was put in prison for seven years. She was the wife of Peng Zhen. Zhang died of illness on 27 May 2015 at the age of 102.
