= Susana Richa =

Member of the National Assembly of Panama
- In office 1999–2009

Governor of Panamá Province
- In office 1994–1998

Minister of Education of Panama
- In office 1981–1984
- Preceded by: Gustavo García de Paredes
- Succeeded by: ?

Personal details
- Born: Susana Richa de Torrijos; October 22, 1924 (age 101) Veraguas Province, Panama
- Party: Democratic Revolutionary Party
- Spouse: Hugo Torrijos
- Children: Hugo Torrijos Richa
- Relatives: Martín Torrijos (nephew)
- Education: Complutense University of Madrid
- Occupation: Educator, essayist, politician

Susana Richa de Torrijos (born October 22, 1924) is a Panamanian educator, essayist, and politician.

== Biography ==
Richa studied at the Normal School of Santiago, where she obtained the title of teacher. She later qualified as a graduate in philosophy, a professor of Spanish at the University of Panama, and a PhD in philology at the Complutense University of Madrid.

Richa was a Spanish teacher at several institutions including the Normal School of Santiago, the Liceo de Señoritas, the Universidad Católica Santa María La Antigua, and the University of Panama. She has served as director of the Spanish Department, dean of the Faculty of Philosophy, Arts, and Education, member of the Editorial Board, member of the Board of Directors, academic vice-rector, and rector in charge of the University of Panama.

In the field of public education, Richa was National Supervisor of Spanish, Deputy Director and National Director of Secondary Education, National Director of Education, Vice Minister of Education, and Minister of Education of Panama from 1981 to 1984.

As an essayist, she published two works: Compendio de literatura hispanoamericana y panameña and La educación panameña, situación, problemas y soluciones.

As a politician, during the government of Ernesto Pérez Balladares she was appointed governor of Panamá Province from 1994 to 1998, when she resigned to be elected legislator of the National Assembly for the Democratic Revolutionary Party in 1999, and re-elected in 2004. She was vice president of the National Assembly on two occasions: 2001–2002 and 2006–2007.

In December 1999 Richa was separated from her position of professor at the Faculty of Humanities at the University of Panama under the Faúndes Law, which prohibited public officials from serving beyond age 75. She sought a reversal before the Third Chamber of the Supreme Court of Justice, but was unsuccessful. On August 20, 2007, she co-sponsored an initiative which successfully repealed the Faúndes Law. In 2011 she received an award for 50 years of service with the University.

Richa is married to Hugo Torrijos (brother of the Panamanian military dictator Omar Torrijos Herrera) and had one son, politician Hugo Torrijos Richa, who died in 2010. She is also the aunt of former President Martín Torrijos.
