= Stef Driesen =

Belgian artist (born 1966)

- Born: 1966 (age 59–60); Hasselt, Belgium

Stef Driesen (born 1966, Hasselt, Belgium) is an artist based in Antwerp.

Driesen studied at Academie Voor Schone Kunsten in Hasselt. He has shown work internationally in exhibitions at Art:Concept in Paris, Marc Foxx in Los Angeles, Harris Lieberman in New York City and at MADRE Museum in Naples. He is represented by Alison Jacques in London and Marc Foxx in LA.
