= Magdalena Álvarez de Seminario =

Argentine politician (born 1920)

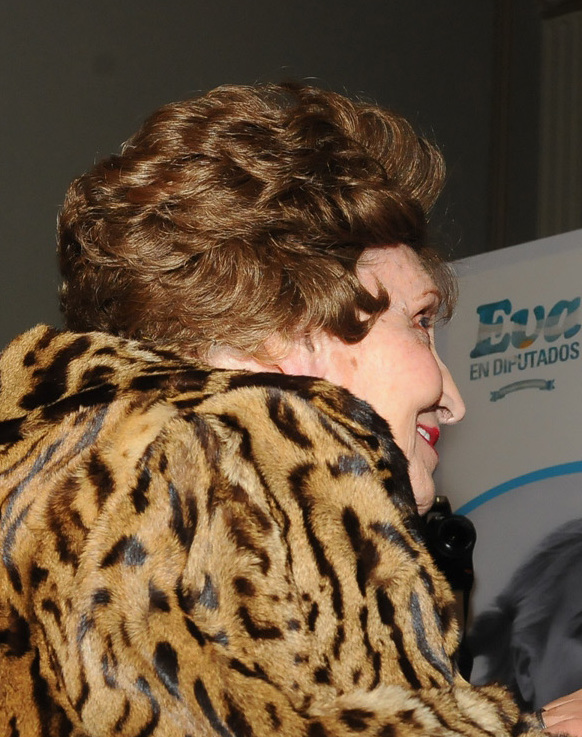
- Álvarez de Seminario in 2012

National Deputy
- In office 25 April 1952 – 21 September 1955
- Constituency: 9th Circunscription of Buenos Aires

Personal details
- Born: May 10, 1920 Alberdi, Buenos Aires, Argentina
- Party: Female Peronist Party; Justicialist Party

Magdalena Álvarez de Seminario (born 10 May 1920) is an Argentine politician. She was elected to the Chamber of Deputies in 1951 as one of the first group of female parliamentarians in Argentina.

== Life and career ==
In the 1951 legislative elections she was a Female Peronist Party candidate in Buenos Aires Province and was 1 of the 26 women elected to the Chamber of Deputies. She remained in office until the Chamber was dissolved as a result of the Revolución Libertadora in September 1955.
