= Ana Carmen Macri =

Argentine politician (1916–2022)

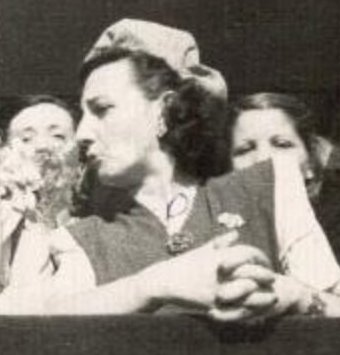
- Macri in 1951

National Deputy
- In office 4 June 1952 – 23 September 1955
- Constituency: 26th Circunscription of Buenos Aires

Personal details
- Born: 15 July 1916 Buenos Aires, Argentina
- Died: 4 February 2022 (aged 105) Buenos Aires, Argentina
- Party: Peronist Party

Ana Carmen Macri (15 July 1916 – 4 February 2022) was an Argentine politician. She was elected to the Chamber of Deputies in 1951 as one of the first group of female parliamentarians in Argentina.

== Biography ==
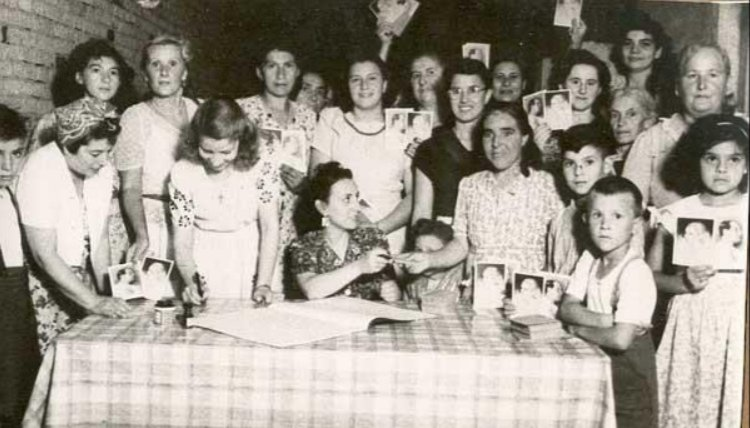
Macri (centre) in 1949.

Macri was born in Buenos Aires on 15 July 1916. In 1938 she started working at Rivadavia Hospital as a secretary for the radiology department.

One of the founders of the Female Peronist Party, in the 1951 legislative elections she was a Peronist Party candidate in Federal Capital and was one of the 26 women elected to the Chamber of Deputies. She remained in office until 1955, when her term was cut short by the Revolución Libertadora. She was subsequently arrested for treason and jailed in Olmos prison until 1958.

Macri turned 100 in July 2016, and died on 4 February 2022, at the age of 105.
