= Wang Dingguo =

Chinese politician (1912–2020)

- 王定国

Member of the 5th, 6th and 7th National Committee of the Chinese People's Political Consultative Conference
- In office August 1978 – March 1993
- Chairman: Deng Xiaoping; Deng Yingchao; Li Xiannian

Personal details
- Born: Wang Yixiang; February 4, 1912 Yingshan County, Sichuan, China
- Died: June 9, 2020 (aged 108) Beijing, China
- Party: Chinese Communist Party
- Spouse: Xie Juezai (m. 1937–1971)
- Children: 7

Military service
- Allegiance: Chinese Red Army
- Years of service: 1933–?

Chinese name
- Traditional Chinese: 王定國
- Simplified Chinese: 王定国
Transcriptions
Standard Mandarin
- Hanyu Pinyin: Wáng Dìngguó

Wang Dingguo (Chinese: 王定国; 4 February 1912 – 9 June 2020) was a Chinese Red Army veteran and politician. She was the wife of Xie Juezai, president of the Supreme People's Court.

== Biography ==
Wang was born Wang Yixiang (王乙香) into a family of farmers in Yingshan County, Sichuan, on February 4, 1912. She took part in revolutionary activities in 1926. Sold into bridal slavery at age 15, she ran away and joined the Chinese Communist Party when she was 21.

Wang joined the Chinese Red Army in October 1933 and joined the CCP in December 1933. She was a member of a theatrical troupe that was formed to boost morale. Wang did props and makeup for the troupe, as well as taking up arms during battles.

Wang marched 6,000 miles on the infamous Long March through hostile territory between October 1934 and October 1936. Wang was one of only 30 women marching alongside 86,000 men. She lost a toe to frostbite.

After the founding of the Communist State, Wang worked in the Ministry of Internal Affairs as a secretary. In 1959, she was transferred to the Supreme People's Court. In 1964, she was transferred again to the National Committee of the Chinese People's Political Consultative Conference, working as secretary to her husband.

Wang retired in 1993.

== Personal life and death ==
Wang was married to Xie Juezai. They met in July 1937 and married in September 1937. The couple had five sons and two daughters. Her second son, Xie Fei, is a well-known film director.

Wang died of an illness in Beijing, on June 9, 2020, aged 108. At the time of her death, she was the oldest surviving Long March veteran.
