= Jeanne Driessen =

Belgian politician (1892–1997)

Jeanne Driessen (born in Maaseik on 3 May 1892; died 15 July 1997) was a Belgian Christen-Democratisch en Vlaams politician when the party was still known as the Christelijke Volkspartij. Her early work in the party started in 1924. She was first elected to a political position in 1927 and served as a Sénatrice from 1950 to 1965.

== Life and work ==
Jeanne Driessen was the second oldest of seven children born to Louis Driessen, mayor of Maaseik, Belgium, and she attended school with the Ursulines nuns in her hometown of Maaseik. She studied from 1921 to 1924 at the Flemish College for Women (Vlaamse Hogeschool voor Vrouwen) in Antwerp. In 1923 she was involved in the foundation of the former students' association.

In 1920, Driessen founded a flourishing section of the Catholic Flemish girls' movement. She also occasionally contributed to Gudrun, the magazine of the Catholic Flemish girls' and women's movement. In addition, she became chairwoman of the Flemish Girls' Guilds in Limburg, monitor at the Catholic Social School for Women in Brussels, Limburg province chairwoman of the Flemish Girls' Union, member of the national board of the Flemish Girls' Union and leader of the Limburg branch of the Female Catholic Workers' Youth. From 1936 to 1958 she was chairwoman of the Limburg branch of the Christian Workers' Women.

After her studies, Driessen worked for a short time at the General Secretariat of Christian Social Women's Works in Brussels. In 1924 she became director of the Christian Social Works in the Limburg mining region. Subsequently, in 1930 she became secretary of the Provincial Association of Women's Guilds in Limburg. She also became vice-chairman of the ACW Limburg and of the Association of Christian Health Insurance Funds in Limburg. From 1940 to 1945, she was provincial chairwoman of the Service for Families Affected by War and the National Service for Servicemen's Families.

From 1927 to 1931 she was a municipal councilor of Genk for the Catholic Party. In 1949 she was elected CVP senator for the district of Hasselt - Tongeren - Maaseik and the following year she was co-opted senator, a mandate she held until 1965. In 1952 and 1953 she was Belgian delegate to the UN General Assembly in New York City.

Jeanne Driessen died in Genk on 15 July 1997 at 105 years of age.
