= Friedrich Wilhelm von Driesen =

General Officer at the Imperial Russian Army

Portrait by George Dawe from the Military Gallery

Friedrich Wilhelm Freiherr von Driesen (Russian: Фёдор Васи́льевич Дри́зен, Fyodor Vasilyevich Drizen; 10 August 1781 – 30 September 1851) was a Baltic German General Officer of the Imperial Russian Army. Driesen was born in 1781 to the military officer and future Governor of Courland, Wilhelm Karl Heinrich von der Osten-Driesen, and his wife, Henrietta Albertina von Bellendorf. Driesen's family had, since the early 14th century, been settled in what is now northwestern Poland, with their lands in the vicinity of Drezdenko. In 1797, seeking greater professional success, Wilhelm Karl Heinrich von der Osten-Driesen moved his family from Brandenburg Prussia to the Russian Empire, where he would receive his position as governor. It was in this period that, beginning in 1797, the young Driesen would establish himself in the Russian military. Accordingly, Driesen's military career began with his appointment to the position of ensign in the Preobrazhensky Regiment.

It was in the earlier conflicts of the Napoleonic Wars that Driesen first distinguished himself, fighting at the battles of Austerlitz, Heilsberg, and Friedland. Consequently, in 1808 Driesen was promoted to the rank of colonel, while serving directly under Major General Alexander Tuchkov. By 1810, he was further promoted to the position of regimental chief of the Murom 21st Infantry Regiment.

During the Patriotic War of 1812, Driesen served as an officer in the Third Infantry Corps, under Nikolay Tuchkov. However, Driesen's service on the battlefield would come to an end in September of that same year. He was wounded at the Battle of Borodino, losing a significant portion of his left leg. Driesen was, in turn, replaced by Major Andrey von Fitinhoff, and was from then on considered to have been a hero of the battle.

Following his career during the Patriotic War, Driesen served in the Russian Empire's Ministry of War. After almost a decade as War Minister of Special Assignments, he was made a lieutenant general in 1826, and was appointed as military commandant of Riga in January 1828. Driesen continued a distinguished career in military service into his later years, and was promoted to the position of General of the Infantry in 1845.

Driesen had five children:

- Alexander (1824-1893) - Russian general, participant in the Russian-Turkish War of 1877-1878.
- Vasily (1833-1903)
- Nikolai (1837-1909) - General of the Infantry, participant in the suppression of the Polish uprising of 1863
- Paul (1842-1907)
- Olga (1844-1913) - married Gustave Ye Struve

Friedrich Wilhelm von Driesen died on 30 September 1851, in Riga.

== Sources ==
- http://www.napoleon-series.org/military/c_battles.html
- http://archiver.rootsweb.ancestry.com/th/read/RUSSIA/2000-02/0949937754
- Dreezen, baronial race // Brockhaus and Efron Encyclopedic Dictionary : in 86 volumes (82 m. and 4 extra.). - SPb., 1890-1907.
- Sokolinskii EK Family History Drizenov: emigration to Russia, emigration from Russia // Sources on the History of Russian immigrants adapt to XIX - XX centuries .: Sat. Article .. - M . 1997.
- Drize in Russia (the story behind the portrait)
- Gender: Osten-Drize on Rodovid
