= Wilbur Faiss =

American politician

Member of the Nevada Senate from the North Las Vegas district
- In office 1976–1984

Personal details
- Born: October 14, 1911 Centralia, Illinois, U.S.
- Died: November 2, 2013 (aged 102) Carson City, Nevada, U.S.
- Party: Democratic
- Spouse: Theresa E. Watts (m. 1933; died 2012)
- Children: 3
- Occupation: small business owner

Wilbur Faiss (October 14, 1911 – November 2, 2013) was an American politician. He served in the Nevada State Senate.

Faiss was born at Centralia, Illinois, in 1911, the son of John and Belle Faiss. He married Theresa E. Watts, whom he had first met at St. Louis, Missouri, on April 14, 1933. They had three sons, Robert, Donald and Ronald. The family relocated to North Las Vegas, Nevada, in 1944, and upon their arrival, Wilbur operated a small business (Truck Haven and later Truck Harbor) and served as a volunteer firefighter. He also a worked on Nevada Test Site in the 1950s, and was a part of a teamsters' union. Retiring from business in 1976, Faiss, then aged 65 ran for election as a Democratic candidate for the Nevada State Senate, winning election to represent North Las Vegas. He served two terms, until 1984. During his time in office advocated for the working class, seniors issues, education, and civil rights. He voted in favor of the Equal Rights Amendment in 1977, and wrote laws including one permitting pharmacists to replace lower-cost generic drugs with brand name drugs, and one to grant free admission for senior citizens to state parks.

He was honored with a resolution in the Nevada Senate in 1983 on the occasion of his 50th wedding anniversary. In January 2012, he and his wife were recognized as one of the longest married couples in the United States by President Barack Obama. He later stated that the key to a long marriage was to compromise; his wife was a Republican while he was a Democrat. His wife, Theresa died on October 28, 2012, at the age of 97, after 79 years of marriage. He later moved to Carson City, Nevada, to be closer to his family. The Wilbur and Theresa Faiss Middle School was named in honor of him and his wife. He delivered an address to the students there on the eve of his 100th birthday in 2011. The Wilbur & Theresa Faiss Park was also named after he and his wife by Clark County.

He was honored by the Nevada State Senate on April 25, 2013, "for his distinguished service to the State of Nevada and his exemplary life achievements". April 25, 2013, was also proclaimed Senate Wilbur Faiss Day by Governor of Nevada Brian Sandoval. Faiss died aged 102 after weeks of hospitalization at Carson City, Nevada, in 2013. He was assumed to be the oldest living former state legislator in the United States at the time of his death. Upon his death, governor Brian Sandoval stated: "I was deeply saddened today to learn of the passing of Wilbur Faiss. Mr. Faiss had a tireless commitment to the state and its people, but most importantly, he devoted his life to his wife and children". He was also honored in the United States Senate by Nevada Senator Dean Heller.
