= Benedetto Cottone =

Italian politician (1917–2018)

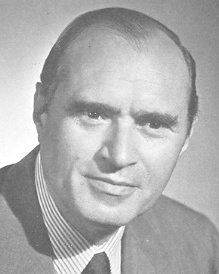
Benedetto Cottone

Benedetto Cottone (4 December 1917 – 13 June 2018) was an Italian politician.

Born on 4 December 1917 in Marsala, Benedetto Cottone was elected to the municipal council prior to winning his first parliamentary election in 1953. He lost reelection in 1958, then returned to the Chamber of Deputies in 1963 for three more consecutive terms, stepping down in 1976.

He died in Rome on 13 June 2018.
