= Domingos Merino =

Spanish politician (1939–2018)

Domingos Rafael Merino Mexuto (21 June 1939 – 31 January 2018) was a Spanish politician associated with Galician nationalist parties. He was the mayor of A Coruña from 1979 to 1981.

== Biography ==
Born in A Coruña, Merino became the first mayor of the city after the Spanish transition to democracy, serving from 1979 to 1981 in representation of the Galician Socialist Party (PSG). He was removed from office by a Union of the Democratic Centre motion of no confidence.

After leaving the mayor's office, Merino was a member of the Galician Socialist Party–Galician Left (PSG-EG), which later joined the Galician Nationalist Bloc (BNG). He was a deputy in the Parliament of Galicia from 1991 to 1993, and 1999 to 2005.

From 2005, Merino was Galicia's Ombudsman (Galician: Valedor do pobo), an office that he left in 2012 due to Parkinson's disease. He died at the age of 78.

Outside of his work, Merino was known for his involvement in chess. He was three times the Galician champion, and a runner-up on the national level. His FIDE rating was 2266.
