= Karpenko =

Karpenko (Ukrainian, Russian: Карпе́нко) or Karpienka (Belarusian: Карпе́нка) is a Ukrainian surname. The Karpenko surname formed as a patronymic surname from the personal name Karp with the diminutive Ukrainian suffix -enko, meaning "son of Karp". The name Karp itself comes from the Greek name Chariton (Χαρίτων), which means "grace" or "gift". Notable people with the surname include:

- Alexey Karpenko (also Oleksiy Viktorovych Karpenko, born 1949), Ukrainian psychophysiologist and cell transplantologist
- Andrey Karpenko (born 1966), Soviet and Russian footballer and football functionary
- Hienadź Karpienka (1949–1999), Belarusian scientist and politician
- Igor Karpenko (born 1976), Ukrainian ice hockey goaltender
- Ivan Karpenko-Karyi (real surname Tobilevych, 1845–1907), Ukrainian playwright and actor
- Nikolay Karpenko (born 1981), Kazakh ski jumper
- Olena Karpenko (stage-name Solomia, born 1981), Ukrainian singer, composer and poet
- Serhiy Karpenko (born 1981), Ukrainian footballer
- Valentyna Karpenko (born 1972), road cyclist from Ukraine
- Victor Karpenko (born 1977), Uzbek footballer
- Viktoria Karpenko (born 1981), Ukrainian and Bulgarian gymnast
