= Larysa Khorolets =

Ukrainian actress and politician (1948–2022)

- Лариса Хоролець
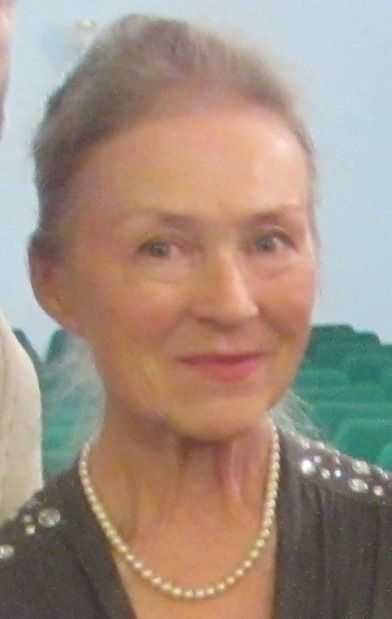
- Khorolets in 2016

1st Minister of Culture of Ukraine
- In office 24 August 1991 – 17 November 1992
- President: Leonid Kravchuk
- Succeeded by: Ivan Dziuba

7th Minister of Culture of Ukrainian SSR
- In office 7 July 1991 – 24 August 1991
- Preceded by: Yuri Olenenko

Personal details
- Born: 25 August 1948 Kyiv, Ukrainian SSR, USSR
- Died: 12 April 2022 (aged 73)
- Education: Kyiv National I. K. Karpenko-Kary Theatre, Cinema and Television University
- Occupation: Actress; Playwright; Politician; Cultural manager; Academic teacher
- Known for: Ivan Franko National Academic Drama Theater; Ukrainian House
- Awards: People's Artist of Ukraine

Larysa Ivanivna Khorolets (Ukrainian: Лариса Іванівна Хоролець; 25 August 1948 – 12 April 2022) was a Ukrainian actress, playwright, cultural manager, politician, and academic teacher. She played at the Ivan Franko National Academic Drama Theater from 1973 to 1990. She served as the Minister of Culture of Ukraine in the Ukrainian SSR from August 1991, and upon Ukraine's independence later that year, serving until 1992. Afterward, she held positions in cultural management, diplomatic service, and academic teaching.

== Life and career ==
=== Acting and writing ===
Khorolets was born in Kyiv. She made her acting debut in the film Partizanskaya iskra in 1957 at the age of nine. She graduated from the Kyiv National I. K. Karpenko-Kary Theatre, Cinema and Television University in 1970. After graduating, she served in the National Writers' Union of Ukraine, and from 1973 to 1990 she was an actress at the Ivan Franko National Academic Drama Theater. Her first role there was in Olenka's The Dove Deer. Other roles included Anna in Ivan Franko's Stolen Happiness and Sophia in Ivan Karpenko-Kary's Untalanna. In 1988, she was named a People's Artist of Ukraine. Her plays, including Сирени (The Lilacs), Мені тридцять (The Thirty-Five of Me), Третій (The Third) and На вулиці Електричній (On the Electric Street), were staged at many theatres in Ukraine.

=== Minister of Culture ===
In 1991, after attending the World Conference of Women Playwrights in Toronto, Canada, Khorolets was nominated to be the Minister of Culture of Ukraine. She accepted, and served from 7 July 1991 to 17 November 1992. Her primary role as Minister of Culture was to rebuild; she needed to kickstart theatres which had been abandoned after the fall of communism in Ukraine. At a reception of diplomats, she said: "Russia is our partner – our equal partner. We may differ, but they are our neighbors and we are linked economically." She left the cabinet when the new President was elected. Khorolets remained working in the government, serving as director of the convention centre known as Ukrainian House until 1998.

=== Other positions ===
Khorolets was deputy head of the Ukrainian National Taras Shevchenko Award Committee from 1991 to 1996. She was an assistant counselor of the Embassy of Ukraine in Germany from 1998 to 2004, in Ukrainian-German commission meetings. She then was a Humanitarian Commissioner of the Verkhovna Rada of Ukraine, working for human rights, until 2012. In 2006, she took part in an international scientific workshop of the National University of Kyiv-Mohyla Academy in Kyiv, Women and Political Movements, as Advisor to the Ombudsman of Ukraine. She took part in a CD recording of contemporary Ukrainian literature and plays, by Liubko Deresh and Lesya Ukrainka, in 2006.

=== Teaching ===
She was active in teaching for 20 years. In 2014, she was appointed professor at the department of dramatic theatre at the Kyiv National University of Culture and Arts. In November 2016, she became head of the department of stage and audiovisual art at the National Academy of Government Managerial Staff of Culture and Arts.

== Death ==
Khorolets died on 12 April 2022, at the age of 73.
