= Shpak =

Shpak may refer to:

- Georgy Shpak, Russian politician
- Marta Shpak, Ukrainian performer
- Nira Shpak, Israeli politician
- Oleksiy Shpak, Ukrainian sportsperson
- Shpak 6844, minor planet
- RSI Europe Špokas, Lithuanian drone
