= Mykola Tochytskyi =

Ukrainian politician and diplomat

- Микола Точицький
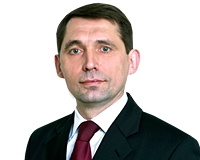
- Official portrait, 2020

Minister of Culture and Strategic Communications
- In office 5 September 2024 – 16 July 2025
- Preceded by: Rostyslav Karandieiev (acting)
- Succeeded by: Tetyana Berezhna

Deputy Minister of Foreign Affairs
- In office 6 April 2021 – 4 September 2024

Representative of Ukraine to the European Union
- In office 4 February 2016 – 6 April 2021

Ambassador to Belgium
- In office 4 February 2016 – 6 April 2021
- Preceded by: Ihor Dolhov

Part-time Ambassador to Luxembourg

Permanent Representative to the Council of Europe
- In office 2010 – 4 February 2016
- Preceded by: Yevhen Perelygin
- Succeeded by: Dmytro Kuleba

Personal details
- Born: Mykola Stanislavovych Tochytskyi; 22 September 1967 (age 59) Vinnytsia, Ukrainian SSR, Soviet Union
- Spouse: Tamara Tochytska
- Education: Taras Shevchenko National University of Kyiv (PhD, International Law)

Mykola Stanislavovych Tochytskyi (Ukrainian: Микола Станіславович Точицький; born 22 September 1967) is a Ukrainian diplomat and politician who was the Minister of Culture and Strategic Communications from 5 September 2024 to 16 July 2025.

He served as the deputy Minister of Foreign Affairs from 2021 to 2024, the Ambassador to Belgium from 2016 to 2021, as well as a Representative of Ukraine to the European Union, and concurrently as the Ambassador to Luxembourg throughout that same term.

Tochytskyi also was the Permanent Representative of Ukraine to the Council of Europe from 2010 to 2016, and formerly the Consul General of Ukraine in San Francisco from 2005 to 2008.

== Biography ==
Mykola Tochytskyi was born in Vinnytsia on 22 September 1967.

He graduated from Uladiv High School in Uladivske.

From 1985 to 1987, he served in the Soviet Army.

In 1993, he graduated from the Taras Shevchenko National University of Kyiv, as a translator of French and English. From 1993 to 1995, he was an Attaché, a Third Secretary of the Department of Arms Control and Disarmament of the Ministry of Foreign Affairs of Ukraine.

In 1995, he graduated from the Institute of International Relations at Kyiv State University, as an international lawyer, with the thesis of the "Legitimacy of the use of nuclear weapons".

From 1995 to 1998, Tochytskyi was the Third, Second Secretary of the Embassy of Ukraine in Belgium, in combination with the works with Benelux, OPCW, NATO, and the European Union. He dealt with Ukraine's cooperation with NATO in the framework of the Partnership for Peace, the development of a Memorandum of Understanding on Civil Emergency Planning between the Ministry of Emergencies of Ukraine and NATO, and Ukraine's cooperation with the Organization for the Prohibition of Chemical and Biological Weapons (OPCW).

From 1998 and 1999, he was promoted to the First Secretary of the Department of Nuclear Disarmament and Strategic Arms Limitation of the Department of Arms Control and Scientific and Technical Cooperation of the Ministry of Foreign Affairs of Ukraine. He studied and graduated from the Geneva Center for Security Policy in 1999.

From 1999 to 2000, he was the First Secretary of the OSCE Division and the Council of Europe of the European Integration Office of the Ministry of Foreign Affairs of Ukraine.

From 2000 to 2001, he was an adviser to the NATO and European Security Division in the Policy and Security Department of the Ministry of Foreign Affairs of Ukraine, dealing with Euro-Atlantic security issues and the NATO Cooperation Program.

From 2001 to 2003, he was an adviser to the Permanent Mission of Ukraine to the Council of Europe in Strasbourg, as his responsibilities included cooperation with the PACE, the Congress of Local and Regional Authorities of Europe, and the Venice Commission.

From 2003 to 2004, he was the First Deputy, Director of the Cabinet of the Minister for Foreign Affairs of Ukraine.

In 2004 to 2005, he was the head of the Consular Service Department of the Ministry of Foreign Affairs of Ukraine.

In 2005 to 2008, Tochytskyi Consul General of Ukraine in San Francisco.

From 2008 to 2010, he was the First Deputy, Head of the Main Service for International Cooperation of the Secretariat of the President of Ukraine. He participated in negotiations to free Faina from the captivity of pirates.

=== As a Permanent Representative to the Council of Europe ===
In 2010, Tochytskyi became the Permanent Representative to the Council of Europe. For the first time in the recent history of Ukraine, he chaired the Committee of Ministers of the Council of Europe, and participated in the signing of the European Convention on Protection.

Tochytskyi's diplomatic career has a special place in his diplomatic career, which he conducts together with his wife, Tamara Tochytska.

In 2011, he held his first Chairmanship of the Committee of Ministers of the Council of Europe for the first time in the history of Ukraine.

During this period, exhibitions of Ukrainian artists, Yuriy Nahulko, Viktor Sevastyanov, and Zoy Skoropadenko took place in Strasbourg.

The music program included concerts by Ukrainian singer of Solomiya Olena Karpenko, and the chamber orchestra "Academy" of the Lviv National Music Academy named after Mykola Lysenko under the direction of Ukrainian composer Myroslav Skoryk.

Throughout the years, the Council of Europe hosted weeks of Ukrainian regions: the Vinnytsia Oblast in 2011, the Dnipropetrovsk Oblast in 2012, and the Autonomous Republic of Crimea in 2013

With the beginning of the Russian aggression against Ukraine in February 2014, during the Revolution of Dignity, Tochytskyi focus of cultural projects of Ukrainian diplomacy in Strasbourg was shifted towards the humanitarian component with charity fairs were held together with the Ukrainian community, and political prisoners in Russia and the occupied Crimea, which would drew attention to acute issues related to the aggression.

On 4 February 2016, Tochytskyi left as the Permanent Representative to the Council of Europe, as he was appointed as the ambassador to Belgium.

=== As an Ambassador ===
As an ambassador, along with Tamara, he created a large-scale projects of cultural diplomacy and contributed to the annual treatment and rehabilitation of Ukrainian servicemen wounded during the environmental protection at Queen Astrid Military Hospital in Belgium.

On the same day, he became the Representative of Ukraine to the EU and the European Atomic Energy Community part-time, and a part-time ambassador to Luxembourg. As an ambassador in that field, he facilitated the entry into force of the EU-Ukraine Association Agreement, the Visa-Free Regime, Ukraine's accession to the European Green Course, preparations for the signing of the Common Aviation Area Agreement, and participated in Ukraine-EU-Russia trilateral gas negotiations on gas transit.

As an ambassador to Luxembourg, he participated in the conclusion of the Protocol amending the Convention for the Avoidance of Double Taxation.

During Tochytskyi's term as Ambassador to Belgium and Luxembourg, Ukraine's cultural presence in almost all spheres of art has significantly increased, as painting, music, theater, cinema, and literature covered all regions of the country and the largest cities - Brussels, Luxembourg City, Antwerp, Ghent, Bruges, Arlon, Liege, Genk and others.

Some significant events of this period are the annual festival "Ukrainian Spring", the Belgian film festival "Bridges East-West", the Luxembourg film festival "CinEast", the participation of the Ukrainian team in the annual festival "EatBrussels"., with the exhibitions of Ukrainian artists Ivan Marchuk, Mykola Telizhenko, Roman Minin, Mykita Kadan, Alevtina Kakhidze, Eduard Belsky, Oleksandr Kudryavchenko, Bohdan Holoyad, Serhiy Sviatchenko, Ihor Musin, Oksana Levchen, Svitlana Lebiga Nadii Senychak and others.

During that period, Belgium hosted numerous meetings with contemporary Ukrainian writers, including Serhiy Zhadan, Andriy Kurkov, Oksana Zabuzhko, Maks Livin, Bohdan Kolomiychuk, Pavlo Arye, Oleh Sentsov, Iryna Karpa, Kateryna Babkina, and Gaska Shiyan. Ballet performances of the National Opera of Ukraine named after T. Shevchenko, East Opera of the MV Lysenko Kharkiv National Academic Opera and Ballet Theater, Odesa National Academic Opera and Ballet Theater, Kharkiv Philharmonic.

He participated in the signing on 18 December 2018, of the Implementation Protocol between Ukraine and the Benelux countries on the readmission of persons.

In October 2019, a monument to Anna Kyivska, daughter of the Grand Duke of Kyiv Yaroslav the Wise, was unveiled in Arlon as part of the Queen's Way project.

He also participated in the signing on 10 February 2021 of the Agreement between Ukraine and Belgium on the implementation of paid activities of some family members of employees of diplomatic missions and consular posts.

On 6 April 2021, Tochytskyi was appointed the Deputy Minister of Foreign Affairs.

On 5 September 2024, he became the Minister of Culture and Strategic Communications. On 16 July 2025, he was dismissed as the Minister of Culture and Strategic Communications.
