= Mykhailo Kulynyak =

Ukrainian public figure

- Михайло Андрійович Кулиняк
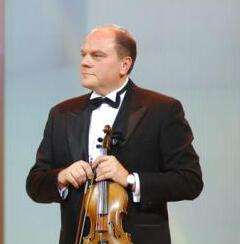
- Born: March 4, 1969 (age 57)
- Education: Kyiv Conservatory; National Academy for Public Administration

Mykhailo Kulynyak (Ukrainian: Михайло Андрійович Кулиняк, born 4 March 1969) is a Ukrainian statesman and public figure, Minister of Culture and Tourism of Ukraine (2010–2012).

== Biography ==
Kulynyak was born on 4 March 1969 in Drohobych, which was then part of the Ukrainian SSR. In 1994 he graduated from the Kyiv University, with a degree as a violinist. He pursued higher education and in 2003 graduated from both the International University of Science and Technology with a master's in organization management and from the National Academy for Public Administration with a master's in public administration.

From March 2004, after graduating, to March 2005 he was Assistant Deputy Minister to the Cabinet of Ministers as a representative of the Secretariat of Cabinet of Ministers He was then from 8 November 2006 to 20 August 2008 Deputy Minister of Culture and Tourism, with Vasyl Vovkun as the minister. Kulynyak then Minister of Culture and Tourism of Ukraine himself from 11 March 2010 to 9 December 2010 as part of the First Azarov government, during which time Viktor Yanukovych was president. The ministry was reshaped upon in December 2010, and he proceeded to continue in his role as minister until 24 December 2012 under the new title of Minister of Culture of Ukraine.

After leaving the ministry Kulynyak became general director of National Palace of Arts "Ukraine" from 8 February 2013 to 2014. Since 2016 he has served as Director of the Institute of Contemporary Art of National Academy of Management of Culture and Arts.
