= Ministry of Culture (Ukraine) =

Government ministry of Ukraine

Ministry of Culture of Ukraine
- Міністерство культури України

Agency overview
- Formed: September 2, 2019; 6 years ago
- Preceding agencies: Ministry of Culture, Youth and Sports; Ministry of Culture and Information Policy
- Jurisdiction: Government of Ukraine
- Headquarters: 19, Ivan Franko Street, Kyiv
- Minister responsible: Tetiana Berezhna
- Child agencies: State Service of Cinematography; State Service of Cultural Valuables Transportation; State Service of National Cultural Heritage; State Service of Tourism
- Website: mcsc.gov.ua/en

The Ministry of Culture of Ukraine (Ukrainian: Міністерство культури України) or MinCult is the main state authority in the system of central government of Ukraine responsible for country's cultural development and history preservation.

== History ==
Chronology of logo changes

The logo of the Ministry of Culture, which appeared around November 7, 2015

Simplified logo of the Ministry of Culture, presented on June 11, 2019 and used until March 23, 2020

Logos of Ministry of Culture, Youth and Sports, used since September 2019 to March 23, 2020

Ministry of Culture and Information Policy logo, used since April 2020 to June 8, 2021

Ministry of Culture and Information Policy logo, presented on June 8, 2021

Ministry of Culture and Strategic Communications logo

Ministry of Culture logo, used since November 2025

=== Ukraine (1917–1919) ===
The origin of the Ukrainian ministry could be traced to the earliest creation of the General Secretariat of Ukraine where a department of culture was created in 1917 within the Secretariat of People's Education headed by Ivan Steshenko. It was created on same principles that existed during the Russian Empire where cultural life in Ukraine was administered by the Russian Ministry of Enlightenment.

In May 1918 the Ukrainian People's Republic established the Ministry of People's Education and Arts headed by Mykola Vasylenko. Later there was a Ministry of Art headed by Dmytro Antonovych (December 1918 - February 1919) that was disbanded soon after the Soviet invasion of Ukraine.

In the 1918 Ukrainian State there existed the Ministry of Confessions that was first created by the government of Pavlo Skoropadskyi on 30 April 1918 and was at first headed by Mykola Vasylenko. After the fall of Skoropadsky the Ministry of Confessions (30 Apri 1918 - 14 December 1918) was transformed into Administration of Cults at first and later into Ministry of Denomination (13 February 1919) both headed by Ivan Lypa. One of the most noticeable ministers however was Ivan Ohiyenko.

=== Soviet Ukraine ===
With advancing Bolsheviks in Ukraine, there also was established the People's Commissariat of People's Education that took over most of cultural life in Ukraine.

On 25 February 1919 by its decree, the Council of People's Commissariats of UkrSSR (CPC of UkrSSR) established Cinema Committee within its People's Commissariat of People's Education and registering all electro-theatres in Ukraine. On 19 February 1921 the CPC of UkrSSR issued statement obligating its People's Commissariat of People's Education to use all of artwork for purpose of communist agitation (propaganda). Previously by decree of 14 December 1920, the CPC of UkrSSR established Main Political and Educational Committee within its People's Commissariat of People's Education.

Another decree of CPC of UkrSSR of 11 March 1921 "About purchase for state museums museum valuables from private individuals" initiated creation of state museums which were previously "nationalised" by Bolsheviks "in the name of the Revolution" in form of simple expropriation. Along with that there was established All-Ukrainian Committee in Conservation of artworks, artifacts, and natural landmarks.

On 19 April 1921 CPC of UkrSSR issued decree "About peasants homes" (Ukrainian: селянські будинки, selyanski budynky) establishing centers of political education (propaganda) in rural areas.

On 22 November 1922, on efforts of people's commissar Hrynko, the Central Executive Committee of Ukraine adopted its statement "About enacting Code of Laws about People's Education" (Ukrainian: Про введення в дію Кодексу законів про народну освіту) which defined the network of cultural and art institutions, their framework of functioning, and mechanisms of administration.

From 1953 to 1991, the Ministry of Culture of the Ukrainian SSR existed.

=== Ukraine (since 1991) ===
Following the independence of Ukraine from the Soviet Union Ukraine retained the cultural management structure inherited from the Soviet Union. In 1997, the ministry changed its name to the Ministry of Culture and Arts of Ukraine.

On 9 December 2010 the ministry was renamed to Ministry of Culture and Tourism of Ukraine.

In 2011, the ministry was again reorganized and its tourism functions were transferred to the new Ministry of Infrastructure, and again the ministry regained the name of the Ministry of Culture of Ukraine.

The Honcharuk Government (on 29 August 2019) merged the Ministry of Youth and Sports, established on 28 February 2013, with the Ministry of Culture of Ukraine, into the Ministry of Culture, Youth and Sports. But the succeeding Shmyhal Government undid this merger, separating the Ministry of Youth and Sports into a separate body, and so on 23 March 2020 the Ministry of Culture, Youth and Sports was renamed the Ministry of Culture and Information Policy, joining the Ministry of Information Policy, which operated from 2 December 2014 to 29 August 2019. On 6 September 2024, the Ministry of Culture and Information Policy was renamed to Ministry of Culture and Strategic Communications. The Ministry of Culture and Strategic Communications became the main state authority in the system of central government of Ukraine responsible for ensuring the informational sovereignty of Ukraine, in particular regarding the dissemination of socially important information in Ukraine and beyond, as well as ensuring the functioning of state information resources and country's cultural development and history preservation.

In mid-August 2025, the acting Minister of Culture and Strategic Communications of Ukraine Tetyana Berezhna stated that the ministry's strategic communications departments would be transferred into a separate institution in a process that should be completed by the end of 2025. On 21 October 2025, Berezhna was appointed Minister of Culture, with strategic communications departments and responsibilities (such as the United News telethon) being taken out of the ministry's portfolio again. Following the change, the ministry was renamed to the Ministry of Culture of Ukraine by the Cabinet of Ministers of Ukraine on 31 October 2025.

== Structure ==
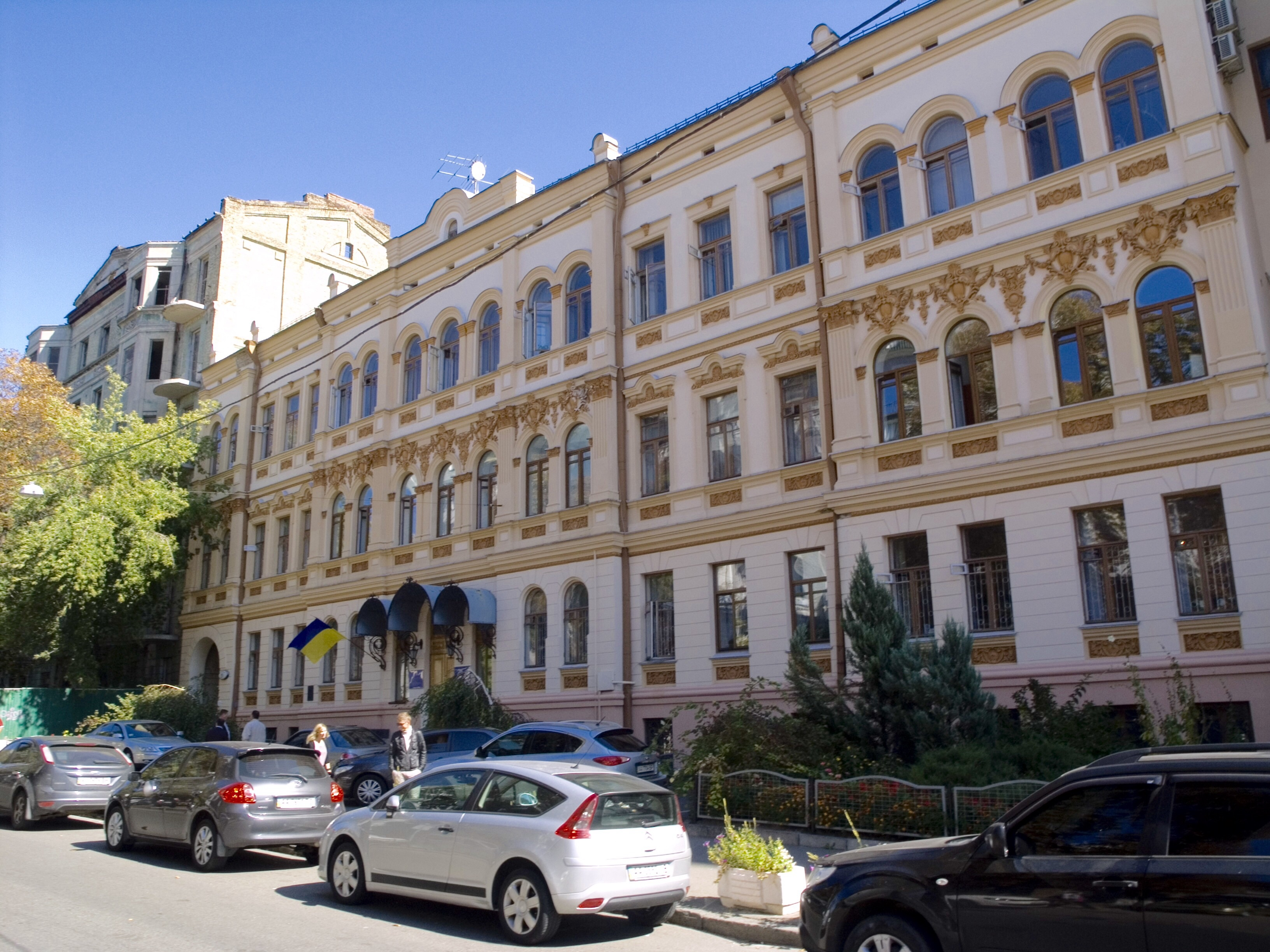
Ministry headquarters at 19 Ivan Franko Street, Kyiv

The ministry consists of the central body of ministry headed by its leadership composed of a minister, his/her first deputy, and other deputies in assistance to the minister. Part of ministry is composed of several state administrations that are specialized in certain field and coordinate operations of government companies.

=== Central body ===
Leadership

- Minister
- First Deputy
- Deputies
- Deputy-Chief of Aparat

Section in support of the Minister's performance

- Sector of informational-analytic work and communication with public

Sector of control and checks in execution of acts and orders of the president of Ukraine, the Verkhovna Rada, and the Cabinet of Ministers of Ukraine as well as the orders of leadership

Sector of job-secrecy work

Sector of mobilization work and public security

Section of financial revisions and support of measures in the fight with corruption

- Sector for prevention and counter-action of corruption

Section of human resources and state service

Directory of legal support

- Section of legal expertise
- Section for the use of legislation
- Sector for conducting a claim work

Directory of Affairs

- Section for documents support and control
- Section for cooperation with Verkhovna Rada
- Sector for organization of access to the public information

Department in formation of the state policy in the sphere of culture, art, and education

- Directory of Arts
  - Section of musical art
  - Section of theatrical art
  - Section of monumental, artistic, and folk art
  - Sector of circus art
- Directory for strategical planning of cultural development and regional policy in the sphere of culture
  - Section of analysis and forecasting of activities in learning institutions
  - Section of analysis and forecasting of socio-cultural development of regions
  - Section of analysis and forecasting of libraries activities
  - Others;

=== State agencies ===
- State Service of Cinematography
- State Service in control of transportation of cultural valuables over the State Border
- State Service in protection of the National Cultural Heritage
- State Service of Tourism and Resorts

=== Ministerial institutions and organizations ===
The ministry also administers a network of museums, libraries, cultural centers, regional centers of folklore, national cultural heritage sites, various artistic education in schools and universities, has own research centers and institutions, promotes circus, musical and theatric arts in regions.

The ministry also maintains the registry of fixed landmarks of cultural heritage (national and local). On 11 December 2012 there were 4,719 such landmarks, 891 of national significance and the other 3,828 of local significance.

Note: while most of the educational state institutions are administered by the Ministry of Education, most arts educational state institutions are administered by the Ministry of Culture.

==== Ukrainian cultural centers ====
- Cultural center of Ukraine in Russia
- Ukrainian cultural and information center in Sevastopol
- State agency in promotion of culture of Ukraine

=== Museums under ministry jurisdiction ===
- National Art Museum of Ukraine
- Aivazovsky National Art Gallery
- Lviv National Art Gallery
- Lviv National Museum
- Museum of The History of Ukraine in World War II
- National Historical Museum of Ukraine
- National Museum-Preserve "Battle for Kyiv 1943"
- Ukrainian National Chornobyl Museum
- National Museum of Literature of Ukraine
- National Museum of Taras Shevchenko
- National Research Restoration Center of Ukraine
- Directorate of Arts Exhibitions of Ukraine
- National Museum Sanctuary of Ukrainian Pottery
- Memorial to the Holodomor Victims in Ukraine
- Prison on Lontskoho
- Marshal Konev Height
- Historic Museum of Church of the Tithes

=== Culture and heritage reserves managed by the ministry ===
- National Historical and Cultural Reserve "Hetman's Capital"
- National Reserve "Khortytsia"
- National Kyiv-Pechersk Historic-Cultural Reserve
- National Reserve "Sophia of Kyiv"
- National Historic-Archeological Reserve "Stone Tomb"
- National Historic-Memorial Reserve "Babyn Yar"
- National Historic-Memorial Reserve "Bykivnia graves"
- National Historic-Cultural Reserve "Kachanivka"
- National Historic-Cultural Reserve "Chyhyryn"
- National Historic-Memorial Reserve "Fields of Berestechko Battle"
- National Historic-Ethnographic Reserve "Pereiaslav"
- National Reserve "Hlukhiv"
- National Reserve "Castles of Ternopil Oblast"
- National Historic-Architectural Reserve "Kamianets"
- Shevchenko National Reserve in Kaniv
- National Architectural-Historic Reserve "Ancient Chernihiv"
- National Reserve "Chersonesos"
- National Reserve "Ancient Halych"

== List of ministers of culture ==
=== Ukrainian SSR ===
| Name of ministry | Name of minister | Term of office | |
| Name of ministry | Name of minister | Start | End |
|---|---|---|---|
| Administration in Art Affairs | Andriy Khvylia | 1936 | 1938 |
| Administration in Art Affairs | Mykola Kompaniets | 1938 | 1944 |
| Administration in Art Affairs | Oleksandr Korniychuk | 1944 | 1945 |
| Committee in Art Affairs | Oleksandr Korniychuk | 1945 | 1946 |
| Committee in Art Affairs | Mykola Kompaniets | 1946 | 1947 |
| Committee in Art Affairs | M.Pashchyn | 1947 | 1950 |
| Committee in Art Affairs | Davyd Kopytsia | 1950 | 1953 |
| Ministry of Culture | Kostiantyn Lytvyn | April 10, 1953 | July 9, 1956 |
| Ministry of Culture | Rostyslav Babiychuk | July 9, 1956 | 1971 |
| Ministry of Culture | Yuri Yelchenko | November 15, 1971 | October 15, 1973 |
| Ministry of Culture | Oleksiy Romanovsky | October 15, 1973 | June 7, 1977 |
| Ministry of Culture | Serhiy Bezklubenko | June 7, 1977 | September 13, 1983 |
| Ministry of Culture | Yuri Olenenko | September 13, 1983 | July 7, 1991 |
| Ministry of Culture | Larysa Khorolets | July 7, 1991 | August 24, 1991 |

=== Post-declaration of Ukrainian independence ===
| Name of ministry | Name of minister | Term of office | |
| Name of ministry | Name of minister | Start | End |
|---|---|---|---|
| Ministry of Culture | Larysa Khorolets | 24 August 1991 | 17 November 1992 |
| Ministry of Culture | Ivan Dzyuba | 17 November 1992 | 19 August 1994 |
| Ministry of Culture and Arts | Dmytro Ostapenko | 25 September 1995 | 4 August 1999 |
| Ministry of Culture and Arts | Yuriy Bohutsky | 4 August 1999 | 7 December 1999 |
| Ministry of Culture and Arts | Bohdan Stupka | 30 December 1999 | 31 May 2001 |
| Ministry of Culture and Arts | Yuriy Bohutsky | 1 June 2001 | 3 February 2005 |
| Ministry of Culture and Tourism | Oksana Bilozir | 4 February 2005 | 5 October 2005 |
| Ministry of Culture and Tourism | Ihor Likhovyi | 5 October 2005 | 1 November 2006 |
| Ministry of Culture and Tourism | Yuriy Bohutsky | 1 November 2006 | 18 December 2007 |
| Ministry of Culture and Tourism | Vasyl Vovkun | 18 December 2007 | 11 March 2010 |
| Ministry of Culture | Mykhailo Kulynyak | 11 March 2010 | 24 December 2012 |
| Ministry of Culture | Leonid Novokhatko | 24 December 2012 | 27 February 2014 |
| Ministry of Culture | Yevhen Nyshchuk | 27 February 2014 | 2 December 2014 |
| Ministry of Culture | Vyacheslav Kyrylenko | 2 December 2014 | 14 April 2016 |
| Ministry of Culture | Yevhen Nyshchuk | 14 April 2016 | 29 August 2019 |
| Ministry of Culture, Youth and Sports | Volodymyr Borodiansky | 29 August 2019 | 4 March 2020 |
| Ministry of Culture and Information Policy | Svitlana Fomenko (acting) | 10 March 2020 | 4 June 2020 |
| Ministry of Culture and Information Policy | Oleksandr Tkachenko | 4 June 2020 | 27 July 2023 |
| Ministry of Culture and Information Policy | Rostyslav Karandieiev (acting) | 28 July 2023 | 4 September 2024 |
| Ministry of Culture and Strategic Communications | Mykola Tochytskyi | 5 September 2024 | 17 July 2025 |
| Ministry of Culture and Strategic Communications | Tetiana Berezhna | 17 July 2025 (acting) | 21 October 2025 |
| Ministry of Culture | Tetiana Berezhna | 21 October 2025 | Incumbent |

== See also ==
- Cabinet of Ministers of Ukraine
- List of historic reserves in Ukraine
- Ukrainian Book Institute
- Premieres of the Season (Musical Festival)
