= Leonid Novokhatko =

Ukrainian politician

- Леонід Новохатько
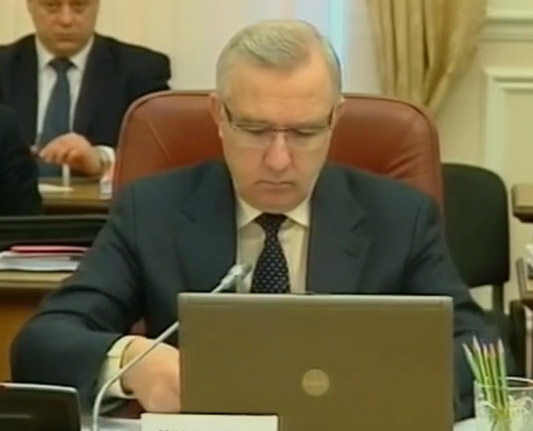
- Novokhatko in 2014

13th Minister of Culture of Ukraine
- In office 5 February 2013 – 24 February 2014
- Prime Minister: Mykola Azarov
- Preceded by: Mykhailo Kulynyak
- Succeeded by: Yevhen Nyshchuk

Personal details
- Born: 11 January 1954 (age 72) Pyriatyn Raion, Poltava Oblast, Ukrainian SSR

Leonid Mykolayovych Novokhatko (Ukrainian: Новохатько Леонід Михайлович; Born 11 January 1954) is a Ukrainian politician who served as the Minister of Culture of Ukraine from 2013 to 2014. He was a member of the Party of Regions.

== Early life ==
Novokhatko was born on 11 January 1954 in Vechirky, which was then part of the Ukrainian SSR in the Soviet Union. In 1975, he graduated from the Poltava V.G. Korolenko National Pedagogical University. Afterwards, he worked as a history teacher at a village school and then later as a lecturer at the pedagogical institute, before attending Kyiv University from 1979 to 1987 as a postgraduate student for his doctoral studies. During this time, he was an assistant and associate professor.

Later, in 1999, he completed his doctoral dissertation on the socio-economic situation in Ukraine from the 1920s to mid 1930s. He briefly worked as First Deputy Director General of Ukrinform from 2007 to 2010, and since 2016 has been Head of the Department of Advertising and Public Relations within the Institute of Journalism of Borys Grinchenko Kyiv University.

== Political career ==
He first became active in politics in 1987 by joining the Communist Party of Ukraine, and served as a lecturer and head of the party press center. In 1993, he was appointed Head of the Sector for Relations with Public Associations and then later Deputy Head of the Main Department of Information and Press Relations for the Cabinet of Ministers. In 1994 he was briefly Head of the Humanitarian Policy Service. Then, from 1996 to 2005, he was Deputy and First Deputy Minister of Culture, before in June 2010 being appointed Deputy Head of the Kyiv City State Administration to oversee cultural heritage protection.

From February 2013 to February 2014 he was Minister of Culture of Ukraine. On 24 February 2014 he was dismissed by the Verkhovna Rada for improper performance of duties.
