= Myroslav Kuvaldin =

Ukrainian singer (born 1975)

Myroslav Kuvaldin Мирослав Кувалдін
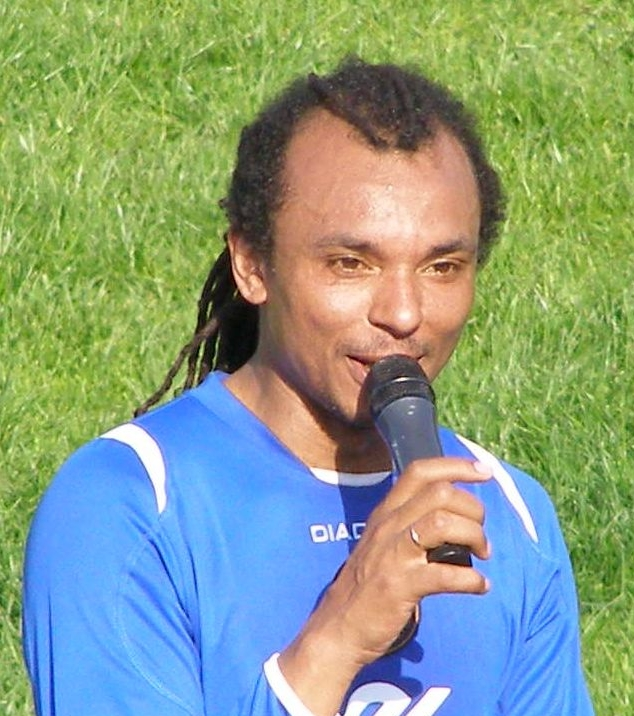

Background information
- Born: Myroslav Dzhonovych Kuvaldin; 19 January 1975 (age 51); Dniprodzerzhynsk, Dnipropetrovsk Oblast, Ukrainian SSR, Soviet Union
- Genres: Reggae
- Occupations: Singer, songwriter, television presenter
- Years active: 1991–present

Myroslav Dzhonovych Kuvaldin (Ukrainian: Мирослав Джонович Кувалдін, romanized: Myroslav Dzhonovych Kuvaldin; born 19 January 1975) is a Ukrainian singer of Nigerian origin, songwriter and television presenter. He is the founder and lead vocalist of the reggae band The VYO.

== Early life ==
Kuvaldin's father is from Nigeria, who lived in Ukraine while studying in the Zaporizhzhia State Medical University. After graduation he returned to Nigeria and Kuvaldin was raised by his mother.

In 1979 Kuvaldin moved to Kobeliaky, Ukraine. He studied first in the Poltava National Pedagogical University, later in a Kharkiv university (speciality "Director of performance and mass events"), later in a Kyiv university, and finally in the Institute of practical psychology.

== Career and The VYO ==
Kuvaldin and Ukrainian guitarist Sergiy Pidkaura founded the band The VYO in Kobeliaky in 1991. In 1995 The VYO won the third place at the all-Ukrainian song festival Chervona Ruta. In 1997 the band signed a contract with an art agency "Terytoriia A". They had been placed in rotation on the national television and reached the peak of their popularity.

In 2000 Kuvaldin started a career of a TV host for the channel M1, and The VYO announced an official disband.

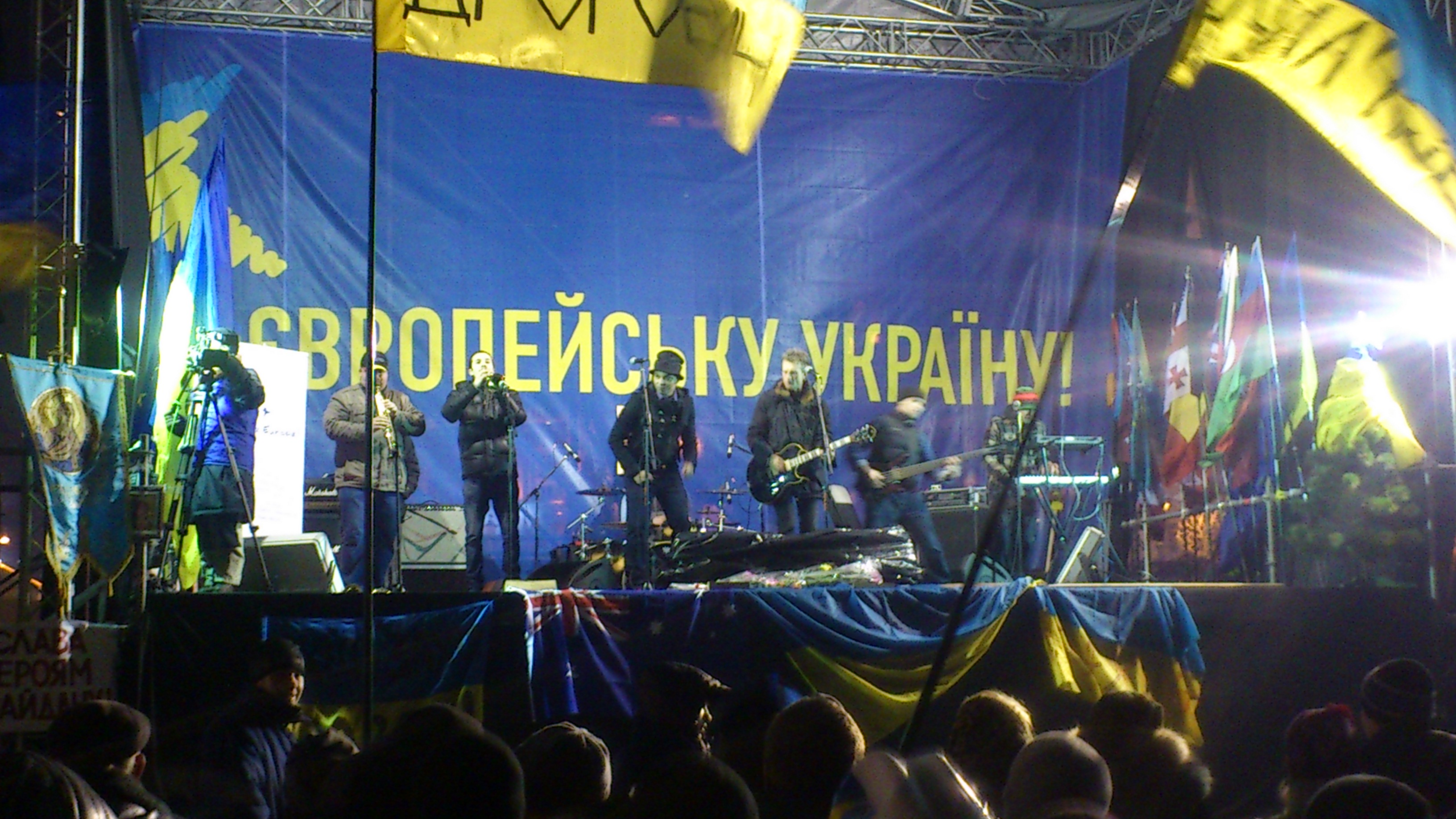
The VYO during the Euromaidan.

On 21 August 2008, the band reunited and released a new album "Ganja".

During the Euromaidan in 2013, Kuvaldin and The VYO supported protesters.

On 10 February 2018, The VYO participated in the Ukrainian national semi-finals of the Eurovision Song Contest 2018.

In May 2018 Kuvaldin recorded a video message in support of Ukrainian filmmaker and activist Oleh Sentsov detained in Russia.

== Discography ==
=== Albums ===
Title	Year	Translation
Vyroby z plastmasy (Вироби з пластмаси)	1998	Products from Plastic
Ganja	2008	
Ye? (Є?)	2012	Is?
Mapa (Мапа)	2014	Map
Zelenyi (Зелений)	2017	Green

=== Singles ===
Title	Year	Literal Translation
"Zaliznyi dukh" ("Залізний дух")	2014	Iron Spirit
"Freedom"	2015	
"Kvasy" ("Кваси")	2015	
"Z Zhytomyra" ("З Житомира")	2016	From Zhytomyr
"Cypa" ("Ципа") (with Mokh)	2016	
"Nam porobleno" ("Нам пороблено")	2016	We are Jinxed
"Tilky ty" ("Тільки ти") (with Black Omolo)	2017	Only You
"Prut rika" ("Прут ріка")	2018	River Prut
"Padaiu v nebo" ("Падаю в небо") (with Mykola Mozhovyi)	2018	I am Falling into the Sky
"Po planu" ("По плану")	2020	According to Plan
"Fazenda vynohrad" ("Фазенда виноград") (with Ocheretiany kit)	2020	Fazenda Grapes
"Braty" ("Брати") (with Jonovych)	2021	Brothers

== Personal life ==
Kuvaldin is married to Liliya Pavlyk-Kuvaldina, a back-vocalist of the band Braty Hadiukiny, and has two sons.
