= Yevhen Nyshchuk =

Ukrainian actor and politician

- Євген Нищук
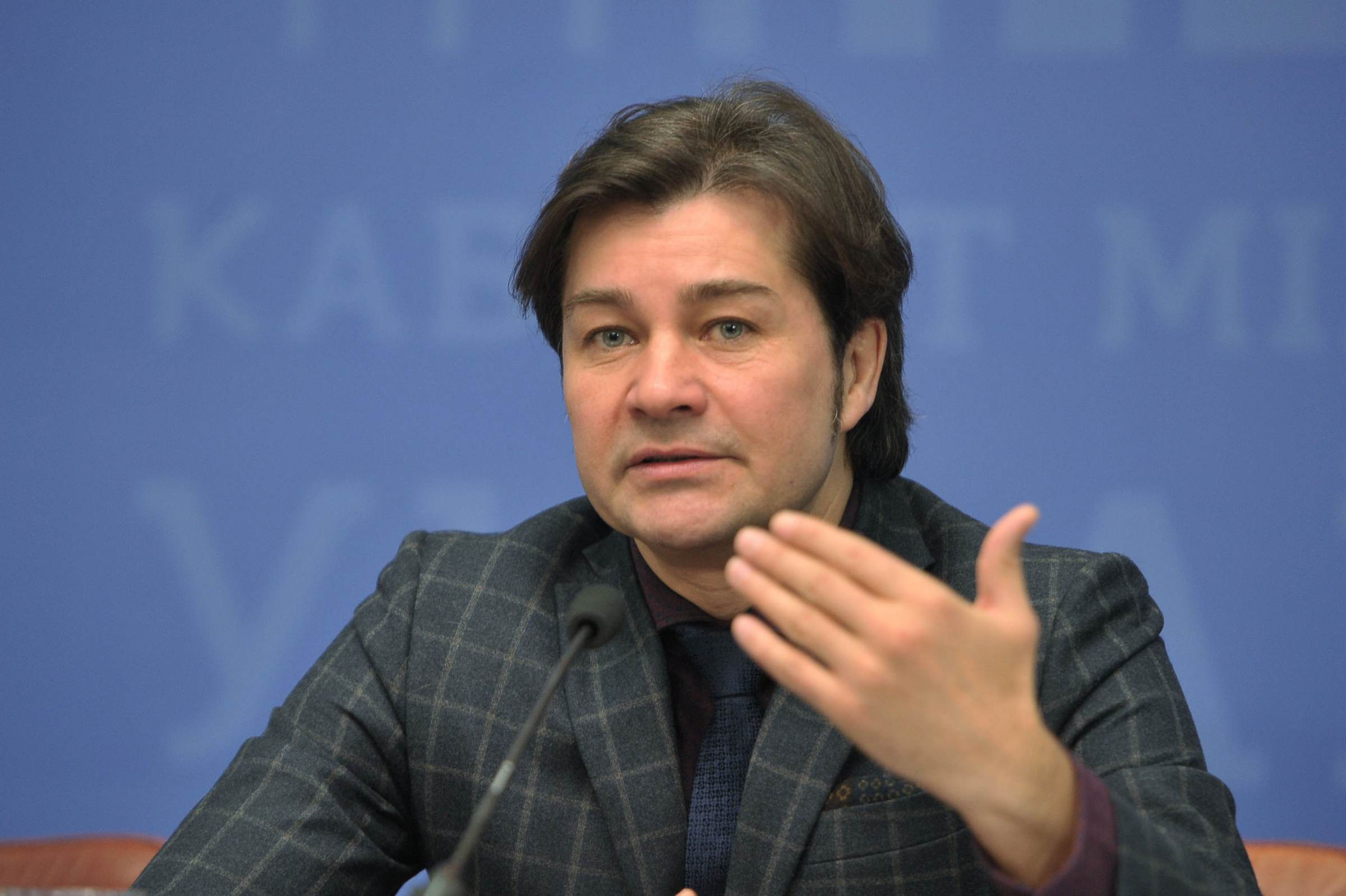
- Nyshchuk in 2017

Minister of Culture
- In office 14 April 2016 – 29 August 2019
- Prime Minister: Volodymyr Groysman
- Preceded by: Vyacheslav Kyrylenko
- Succeeded by: Volodymyr Borodiansky
- In office 27 February 2014 – 2 December 2014
- Prime Minister: Arseniy Yatsenyuk
- Deputy: Olesya Ostrovska-Lyuta
- Preceded by: Leonid Novokhatko
- Succeeded by: Vyacheslav Kyrylenko

Personal details
- Born: 29 December 1972 (age 53) Ivano-Frankivsk, Ukrainian SSR, Soviet Union (now Ukraine)
- Party: Independent
- Spouse: Oksana Bat'ko-Nyshchuk (died 2016)
- Children: Oleksa (born 1995), Yevhen (2019), Anna (2022)
- Education: National University of Theatre, Film and TV in Kyiv
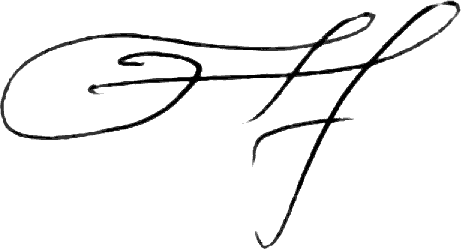
- Signature

Yevhen Mykolayovych Nyshchuk (Ukrainian: Євген Миколайович Нищук; born 29 December 1972) is a Ukrainian theater and cinema actor, Merited Artist of Ukraine and a former Minister of Culture of Ukraine. He held the post from February to December 2014, and again from April 2016 to August 2019.

== Biography ==
Born 29 December 1972 in Ivano-Frankivsk.

In 1995, he graduated from National University of Theatre, Film and TV in Kyiv (Workshop of National Artist of Ukraine Valentina Zymnya).

He attended the Actor Kyiv academic workshop of theater art "Constellation".

Nyshchuk was Minister of Culture of Ukraine in the 2014 Yatsenyuk Government from 27 February 2014 till 2 December 2014. In the 2 December 2014 appointed second Yatsenyuk Government, he did not return. Nyshchuk also did not participate in the 2014 Ukrainian parliamentary election. From 14 April 2016 until 29 August 2019 he was again Minister of Culture.

Nyshchuk took part in the July 2019 Ukrainian parliamentary election with the party Ukrainian Strategy. But this party did not win any seats in the election.

== Public and political activity ==
Yevhen led artistic events held at the Kyiv Academic Workshop of Theater Art "Constellation" and initiated many festivals, concerts, state events with the participation of the first persons of the state.

Yevhen Nischuk, together with the first persons of the state, represented Ukraine in the days of culture of Ukraine in Georgia, Azerbaijan, Kazakhstan, Germany, Poland and others.

The actor contributed to the international recognition by the countries of the Holodomor in Ukraine as a crime against humanity, traveling with the artistic project "Panahid by the Holodomor" by Europe - Israel, Holland, Great Britain, Czech Republic, Slovakia, Poland, France. He was awarded thanks to the President and the Ministry of Culture and Tourism of Ukraine.

On April 14, 2016, the Verkhovna Rada of Ukraine appointed a new Cabinet of Ministers of Ukraine (Groysman's government), with Yevhen Nyshchuk as the Minister of Culture of Ukraine.

=== Maidan 2004 and 2013–2014 ===
During the Orange Revolution, he was known as the "voice of Maidan." He became a moderator on the stage of EuroMaidan 2013–2014, invited by Yuriy Lutsenko. He had not participated in any rallies in the previous nine years, despite previous invitations.

=== Russian invasion of Ukraine ===
During the 2022 Russian invasion of Ukraine, Nyshchuk served in the Armed Forces of Ukraine, stationed in the area around Kyiv.

== Personal life ==
Nyshchuk's first wife was actress Oksana Bat'ko-Nyshchuk. Their son Oleksa was born around 1995. Oksana died in May 2016 after a long illness. After that Nyshchuk started dating actress Anastasia Blazhchuk, who is 18 years younger than him. The couple entered a civil partnership and has two children: son Yevhen and daughter Anna.
