= Rostyslav Babiychuk =

Soviet-Ukrainian politician (1911–2013)

- Ростислав Бабійчук

Minister of Culture of Ukrainian SSR
- In office 10 July 1956 – 15 November 1971
- Preceded by: Kostiantyn Lytvyn
- Succeeded by: Yuriy Yelchenko

First Secretary of Zhytomyr Oblast committee of the Communist Party of Ukraine
- In office 16 September 1951 – 5 May 1952
- Preceded by: Serhiy Kostyuchenko
- Succeeded by: Oleksiy Fedorov

Personal details
- Born: 14 February 1911 Kishinev, Bessarabian Governorate, Russian Empire
- Died: 11 January 2013 (aged 101) Kyiv, Ukraine
- Party: Communist Party of the Soviet Union

Rostyslav Volodymyrovych Babiychuk (Ukrainian: Ростислав Володимирович Бабійчук; 14 February 1911 – 11 January 2013) was a Soviet and Ukrainian party and state official.

== Biography ==
Rostyslav Babiychuk was born in Kishinev, Bessarabia Governorate, Russian Empire (today Chișinău, Moldova) in a family of railway workers. He joined the All-Union Communist Party (Bolsheviks) (Communist Party of the Soviet Union) in 1939 and headed department of propaganda and agitation at the Odessa Railways Khrystynivka department, while being an instructor at the Communist Party (Bolsheviks) of Ukraine.

During the World War II he worked at the Northern Railway in Ivanovo.

In 1951–1952 Babiychuk was the First Secretary of Zhytomyr Oblast committee of the Communist Party (Bolsheviks) of Ukraine. In 1954–1976 he was a candidate member of the Central Committee of the Communist Party of Ukraine. In 1956–1971 Babiychuk was a Minister of Culture of Ukraine.

Political offices
Preceded by Kostiantyn Lytvyn	Minister of Culture of Ukrainian SSR; 1956-1971	Succeeded by Yuriy Yelchenko
Preceded by Serhiy Kostyuchenko	First Secretary of Zhytomyr Oblast committee of the Communist Party of Ukraine; 1951–1952	Succeeded by Oleksiy Fedorov
