= National Museum of Literature of Ukraine =

Museum in Ukraine

- Національний музей літератури України
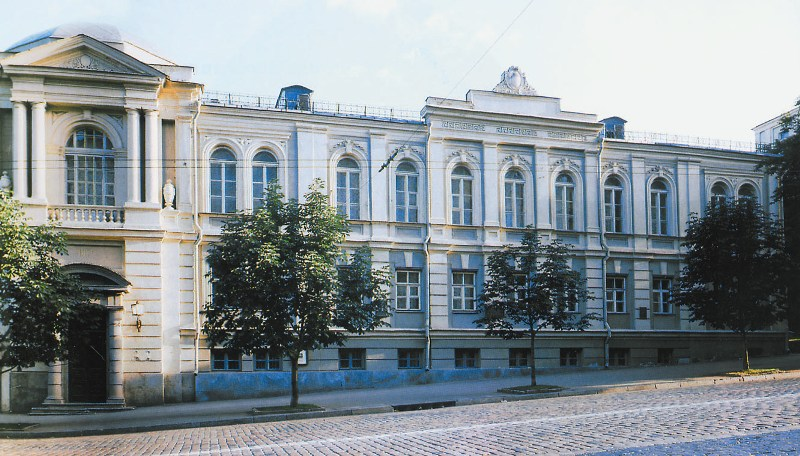
- Established: 1986
- Location: Kyiv, Ukraine
- Coordinates: 50°26′43″N 30°30′59″E
- Type: Museum
- Collections: Literature
- Owner: Ministry of Culture and Strategic Communications
- Website: museumlit.org.ua

Immovable Monument of Local Significance of Ukraine
- Official name: Колегія Павла Галагана (College of Pavlo Galagan)
- Type: Architecture
- Reference no.: 3525/2-Кв

The National Museum of Literature of Ukraine (Ukrainian: Національний музей літератури України, romanized: Natsionalnyi muzei literatury Ukrainy) is a national museum in the former Pavlo Galagan Collegium's main structure in Kyiv. It covers Ukrainian literature's development from the ninth century to the present. The museum has a branch, the Kyiv Literary Memorial Museum, in the apartment of Mykola Bazhan.

== History ==
=== Pavlo Galagan College ===
The museum is housed in a 19th-century architectural landmark building that was constructed in 1871 in the late-classical style under the design of architect O. Ya. Schille on the corner of Bohdan Khmelnytskyi and Tereshchenkivska Streets. The Pavlo Galagan College, one of the top private schools in the Ukrainian capital known as the Nursery of Ukraine by the tsarist Okhranka, has called this structure home since 1871. There have been numerous visits from representatives of Ukrainian literature, and in the years 1885 and 1886, the renowned Ukrainian author Ivan Franko worked in the college's library, which boasts an exquisite two-story mahogany interior that was designed by Italian masters and has been preserved almost entirely to this day. The Collegium was in charge of the Church of St. Paul during the time. Olga Khoruzhynska and Ivan Franko were wed here in May 1886. The initial exhibition hall is still on the grounds of the library.

=== National Museum of Literature of Ukraine ===
The National Museum of Literature of Ukraine was established as the State Museum of Literature of the Ukrainian SSR in accordance with a decree of the Council of Ministers of the Ukrainian SSR dated 5 August 1981. The building welcomed guests on 2 July 1986. By decree dated 19 May 1999, the President of Ukraine accorded the museum national status in recognition of its significant contribution to the preservation of the nation's summer heritage and its important position in the nation's spiritual life.

The volunteer group "Museum Bees" has been working in the museum since January 2015. For the soldiers fighting in the Ukrainian-Russian conflict in Eastern Ukraine, volunteers make camouflage nets and kikimora outfits. The initiative was started by volunteers under the direction of Yulia Kozachok, with support from the museum's staff and Anzhelika Rudnytska. 51 kikimora and 57 nets have been created by volunteers, as of January 2016. In 2015, volunteers took center stage in Lithuanian filmmaker Arturas Morozovas' documentary "Origin of Kikimora". The movie traveled to Kyiv and the Eastern part of Ukraine in the summer of 2015.

== Exhibits ==
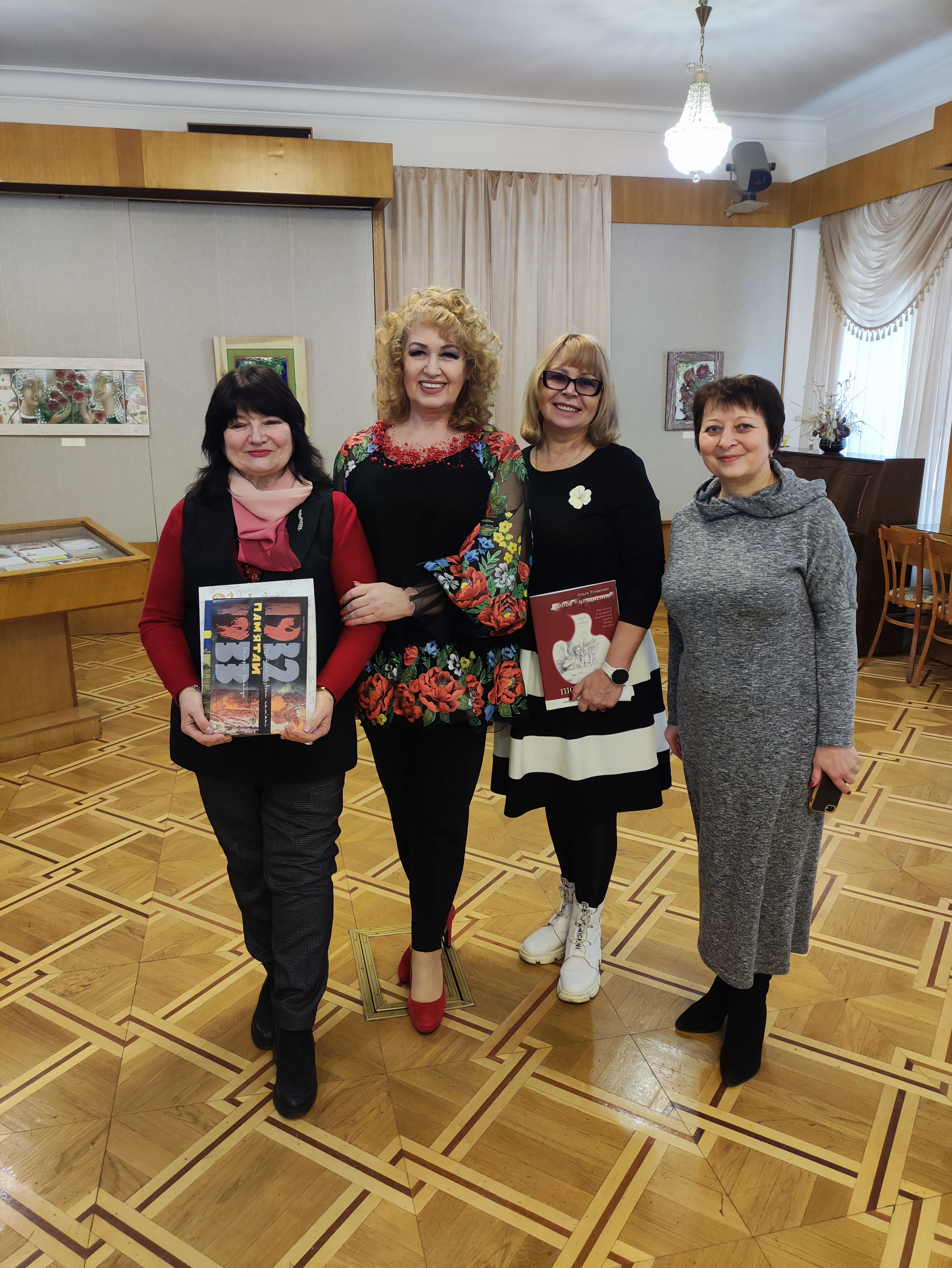
Librarians on the book donation day, February 2023.

The library currently houses a permanent exhibition with items that describe the background of this academic establishment. As a school of academics, Pavlo Galagan College made its mark on the history of national culture and education. The museum features a corner of an ancient Russian chronicler, a reconstruction of a 17th-century printing press, and a diorama of a Ukrainian village. Moreover, the exposition includes memorial items of Mykhailo Semenko, Pavlo Tychyna, Hryhorii Kosynka, Ostap Vyshnya, Yuriy Lavrinenko, Ulas Samchuk, a handwritten notebook of poems by Vasyl Symonenko, manuscripts of Dokiya Humenna, personal items and manuscripts of Vasyl Stus, Yevhen Sverstiuk, books that were with the artists in prisoners. Exhibits in the museum are separated into different sections.

- The 19th century section:
  - Lifetime editions of the works of Ivan Kotliarevsky, Taras Shevchenko, Panteleimon Kulish, Mykola Kostomarov, Ivan Franko, Mykhailo Drahomanov.
  - Manuscripts of Lesya Ukrainka, Mykhailo Starytsky, Olha Kobylianska.
  - Memorial items of Marko Vovchok, Panas Myrny, Ivan Nechuy-Levytsky, Olha Kobylianska
  - Photographs of Marko Vovchok, Maria Zankovetska, Dniprova Chayka,
  - Autographed books and other valuable items.
- The 20th century section:
  - Modernist writers of the beginning of the century
  - Artists of the 1920s and 1930s, known as the artists of the shot revival
  - Unique artistic phenomenon sixties
  - Works of dissident writers, self-published
  - Works of Ukrainian writers abroad (first wave of emigration, Prague School, New York Group)

The museum's exhibits and exhibitions are updated frequently and welcome visitors of all ages. Process that has existed in Ukrainian territory since the beginning of time. Around 5,000 priceless exhibits are on display, including one-of-a-kind antiquarian books, manuscripts, first editions, modern editions, remembrance objects, photos, and works of fine and decorative applied art.

== See also ==
- List of museums in Ukraine
