= Poltava V.G. Korolenko National Pedagogical University =

Higher educational institution in Ukraine

Coordinates: 49°35′30″N 34°33′21″E

- Полтавський національний педагогічний університет імені В. Г. Короленка
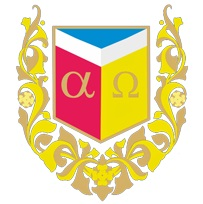
- University logo
- Type: public university
- Established: 1914
- Affiliations: Ministry of Education and Science of Ukraine
- Rector: Maryna Hrynyova
- Students: 4925
- Location: Poltava, Ukraine
- Campus: Urban
- Website: pnpu.edu.ua
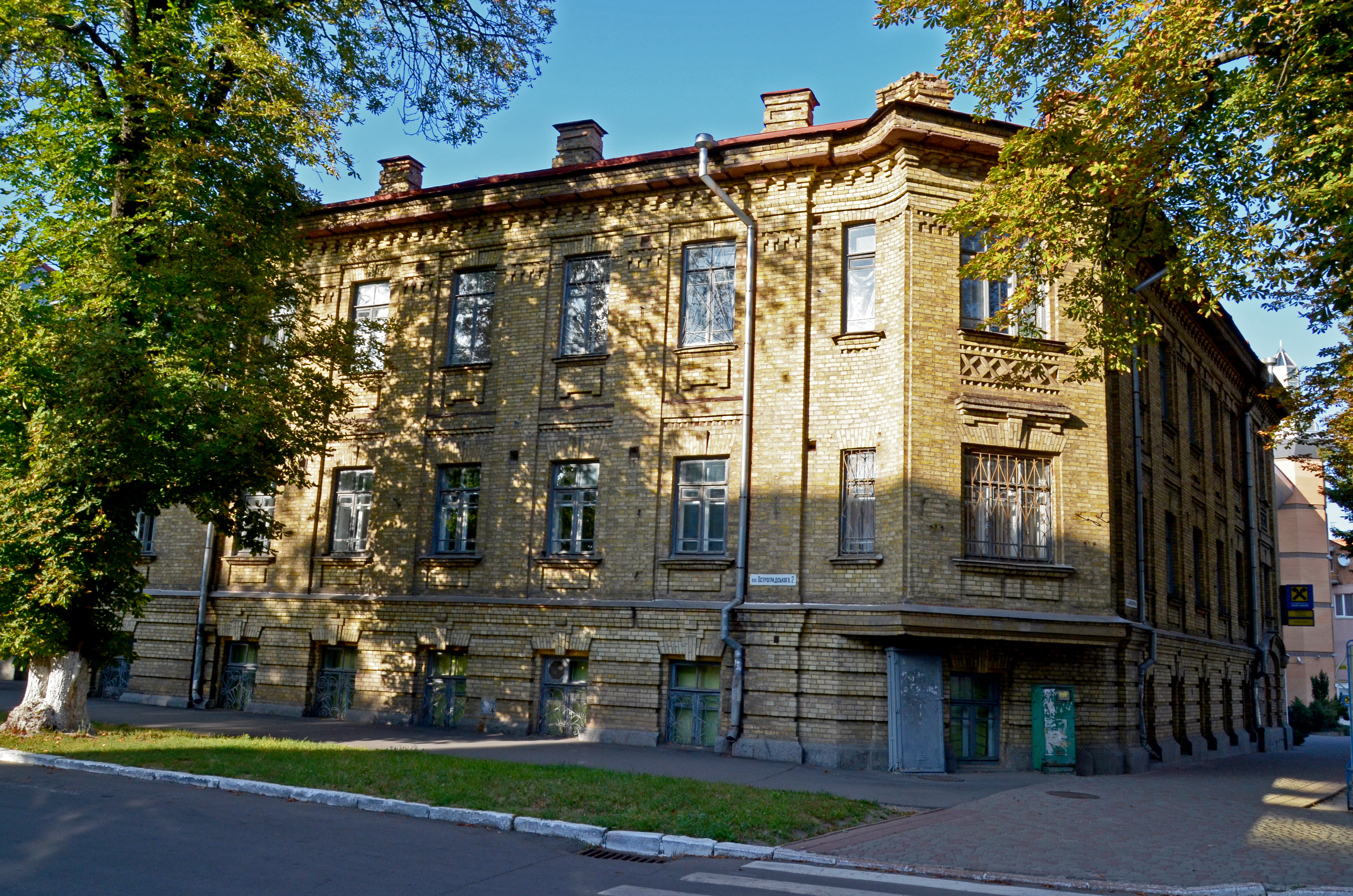

Immovable Monument of Local Significance of Ukraine
- Official name: Навчальний корпус (Educational campus)
- Type: Architecture
- Reference no.: 4757-Пл

The Poltava V.G. Korolenko National Pedagogical University is a higher educational institution in Ukraine that dates back to 1914. It is the oldest university in Poltava Oblast.

== History ==
On 1 July 1914, following the Imperial decree, a Teachers' Institute was founded in Poltava. In 1918, the Faculty of History and Philology was opened. In July 1919, the institute was transformed into a pedagogical one. In 1920, the Poltava Pedagogical Institute had three faculties: History and Philology, Physics and Mathematics, and Natural Sciences. There were 25 lecturers.

On 14 April 1921, a Pedagogical Institute was reorganized into the Poltava Institute of Public Education by merging the Poltava Pedagogical Institute and the Poltava Faculty of History and Philology. The first dean of the latter, and later the rector of the educational institution, became the historian and archivist Ivan Rybakov. His successor was Myroslav Gavryliv.

In 1921–1922, the institute had two faculties: Natural Sciences and Mathematics and History and Philology. In the 1922–1923 academic year, the Faculty of Social Education was created with majors in Industry (Mathematics and Physics), Social Science, and Agriculture. In 1922, 34 teachers and 18 administrative personnel worked at the institute, and 369 students studied there.

On 24 August 1930, the Institute of Social Education was transformed into the Institute of Social Education, and in 1933 into a Pedagogical Institute with the Faculties of Physics and Mathematics, Natural Sciences and Geography, History and Philology, and a Preschool Department. In 1936, the Poltava Teacher's Institute was established at the institute with the Faculties of Language and Literature, and Physics and Mathematics. Before the start of the World War II, the institute had 15 departments with about a hundred teachers, and 1,500 full-time and 1,400 part-time students.

During the Nazi occupation of Poltava in 1941–1943, the Pedagogical Institute, like other higher education institutions in the city, did not function. Its premises were turned into barracks for German soldiers, but part of the university's administration remained. In January 1942, there were 26 people in the institute's staff. In the first months of the German occupation, a children's agricultural research station was still working at the institute, but in the fall of 1942, after the establishment of the Poltava Gebit, only technical workers were left in the institute.

On October 21, 1943, the Poltava Pedagogical and Poltava Teachers' Institutes resumed work. As of October 1944, 397 students studied there. In 1951 the teachers' institute was closed, but training in it at the hospital continued until 1954.

In December 1949, the Poltava State Pedagogical Institute was named after Volodymyr Korolenko. On 9 December 1999, following the Resolution No. 448 of the Cabinet of Ministers of Ukraine the Poltava State Pedagogical Institute was transformed into the Poltava State Pedagogical University. On November 25, 2009, Poltava State Pedagogical University was granted the status of national by the decree of the President of Ukraine, Viktor Yushchenko.

== Today ==
Poltava V.G. Korolenko National Pedagogical University is an educational and scientific center, with students of all levels of higher education (from bachelor's to doctoral studies). There are many multidisciplinary educational programs and active research with educational and methodological activities.

Teachers with academic degrees of candidates and doctors of science and the titles of associate professors and professors work at Poltava V.G. Korolenko National Pedagogical University. It employs 280 scientific and pedagogical workers, including 52 doctors of science, 36 professors, and 185 candidates of science, associate professors.

The university has 7 faculties: History and Geography, Natural Sciences, Philology and Journalism, Physics and Mathematics, Psychology and Pedagogy, Technology and Design, and Physical Education. There are 35 departments in total.

The university publishes 10 periodical scientific publications, including "Psychology and Personality", "Philosophical Horizons", "Origins of Pedagogical Mastery", "Biology and Ecology ", "Ukrainian professional education", "Pedagogical sciences", "Philological sciences", "Aesthetics and ethics of pedagogical action".

Poltava V.G. Korolenko National Pedagogical University has its own official newspaper "University Time". The university cooperates with educational and scientific institutions of Austria, Belarus, Bulgaria, Brazil, Great Britain, Georgia, Estonia, Israel, Spain, Canada, the People's Republic of China, the Kingdom of Denmark, Latvia, within the framework of international agreements. Lithuania, Germany, Poland, Slovakia, Slovenia, USA, Turkey, Czech Republic, Sweden, Japan.

Today, the university is housed in four educational buildings, has four dormitories for 1,300 places, and a sports complex. The institution operates educational and scientific laboratories and centers: "Botanical Garden", molecular acoustics, psychology, International and All-Ukrainian Makarenko Center, Scientific and Methodological Center for the Quality of English Language and Foreign Literature, Historical and Anthropological Research Center, Poltava Journalism Research Center, Coaching Center, Korolenkiv Center, "Sakura", Educational Design Center, and Ukrainian-Austrian-German Center for Behavioral Economics.

The university library has 605,515 copies of both traditional paper and electronic media and is the largest book depository in the Poltava region. The university has developed an infrastructure that corresponds to the main directions of its activity specified in the Charter and provides training of pedagogical and non-pedagogical (ecologists, journalists, cultural experts, psychologists, social workers) specialists of the highest level.

The university has created conditions for those wishing to undergo military training under the reserve officer training program (military department). About 60 masters of sports of Ukraine, 4 masters of sports of international class, 1 honored worker of physical culture and sports of Ukraine (head of the circle) study and work at the university.

== Rectors ==
- 1914–1917: Oleksandr Volnin
- 1917–1919: Oleksandr Levitsky
- 1920–1921: Valentyn Nikolaev
- 1921–1922: Ivan Rybakov
- 1922–1923: Myroslav Gavryliv
- 1923–1924: Volodymyr Shchepotiev
- 1924–1925: Oleksandr Khodak
- 1925–1930: Matvii Farber
- 1930–1931: Karl Zhagar
- 1931–1933: Radion Kulinenko
- 1933–1934: Petro Koynash
- 1934–1935: Mykhailo Dashchenko
- 1935–1937: Ivan Onisin
- 1938–1940: Mykola Dotsenko
- 1940–1941: Petro Aseev
- 1943–1944: Anton Boyko
- 1944–1949: Fedir Redko
- 1949–1952: Ivan Kirsa
- 1952–1953: Dmytro Nenenko
- 1953–1971: Mykhailo Semivolos
- 1971–1975: Oleksandr Zuban
- 1975–1990: Ivan Zyazyun
- 1990–2008: Volodymyr Pashchenko
- 2008–2009: Petro Kyridon (acting)
- 2009–2021: Mykola Stepanenko
- 2021–present: Maryna Hrynyova

== Selected notable graduates ==
- Oleg Bazhan - a Ukrainian historian.
- Roman Bezus - a Ukrainian football player, attacking midfielder of the national team of Ukraine and the Belgian "Ghent".
- Oleksandr Bilenkyi - a Ukrainian politician, Chairman of the Poltava Regional Council since 2015.
- Iurii Kondratiuk - a Ukrainian scientist-inventor, a pioneer of rocket technology and the theory of space flights.
- Myroslav Kuvaldin - a Ukrainian singer of Nigerian origin, musician, TV presenter, and leader of the band "The VYO".
- Oleksandr Kulyk - a Ukrainian politician and human rights defender.
- Ruslan Marchenko - a senior soldier of the Armed Forces of Ukraine, a participant in the Russian-Ukrainian war.
- Leonid Novokhatko - a Minister of Culture of Ukraine (2013-2014). Doctor of historical sciences, professor, Honored Worker of Science and Technology of Ukraine.
- Andrii Pyatov - a Ukrainian football player, the goalkeeper of Football Club “Shakhtar Donetsk” and the captain of the national team of Ukraine. Honored Master of Sports of Ukraine in football (2009).
- Yurii Cheban - a Ukrainian rower-canoeist, two-time Olympic champion (2012 and 2016), bronze medalist of the Olympic Games (2008), winner of the World and European Championships. Honored Master of Sports of Ukraine.
- Volodymyr Chesnakov - is a Ukrainian football player, central defender of Poltava Football Club “Vorskla”.

== See also ==
List of universities in Ukraine
