= Yuriy Bohutsky =

Ukrainian politician (1952–2019)

- Ю́рій Петро́вич Богу́цький
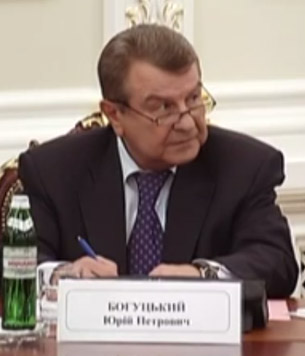
- Bohutsky in 2014
- Born: Yuriy Petrovich Bohutsky'; 24 September 1952; Mykolayivka, Velyka Lepetykha Raion, Kherson Oblast, Ukraine SSR, USSR
- Died: 14 May 2019 (aged 66)
- Education: Kherson School of Culture, Kyiv National University of Culture and Arts, Higher Party School at the Central Committee of the Communist Party
- Occupation: politician
- Known for: Ministry of Culture (Ukraine) (1999–2007)
- Spouse: married
- Children: 2 daughters
- Awards: see {{#Awards|Awards}}

Yuriy Petrovich Bohutsky (Ukrainian: Ю́рій Петро́вич Богу́цький; 24 September 1952 – 14 May 2019) was a Ukrainian politician who served three terms as the Minister of Culture between 1999 and 2007.

Honored Art Worker of Ukraine, professor, Candidate of Philosophical Sciences, Director of the AUC Institute of Cultural Studies.

== Biography ==
Yuriy Bohutsky was born on September 24, 1952, in the village of Mykolayivka, Velyka Lepetykha Raion, Kherson Oblast.

He graduated from the Kherson School of Culture, majoring in "director", Kyiv National University of Culture and Arts, majoring in "club worker of the highest qualification, head of theatrical staff", Higher Party School at the Central Committee of the Communist Party, majoring in "political scientist".

In 1975–1991, he worked for the Komsomol and the Party in Kherson and Kyiv.

In 1991–1992, Bohutsky was the Deputy Minister of Culture of Ukraine.

In 1992–1994, he worked as an Assistant to the President of Ukraine, in 1994-1995 he was an Acting Professor of the Institute for Advanced Training of Cultural Workers, in 1995-1997 he became an Adviser to the Prime Minister of Ukraine, in 1997-1999 he was an Assistant to the Prime Minister of Ukraine.

In 1999 from January to August Bohutsky was a Head of the Department for Humanitarian Affairs of the Office of the President of Ukraine.

In 1999–2001, he was Deputy Chairman of the President's Office, Head of the Main Department for Domestic Policy.

In August–December 1999, he was the 4th Minister of Culture of Ukraine.

From June 2001 to February 2005, he took the position of the 5th Minister of Culture and Arts.

In November 2006 – December 2007, Bohutsky was the 6th Minister of Culture and Tourism of Ukraine.

Then he worked as Deputy Head of the Secretariat of the President of Ukraine. He resigned on March 19, 2010, but on March 31, 2010, he became an Adviser to the President of Ukraine.

From December 2010 to February 2013, Bohutsky served as First Deputy Minister of Culture, and then he was appointed Advisor to the President — Head of the Main Department for Humanitarian Development of the Administration.

The former President of Ukraine Petro Poroshenko has reappointed Yuriy Bohutsky as an Adviser to the President. This is stated in the decrees No. 731-732 of September 16, 2014. Thus, by one decree, Poroshenko dismissed Bohutsky from the post of Presidential Adviser — Head of the Main Department for Humanitarian Development of the Presidential Administration, and by another Poroshenko appointed him an Adviser to the President.

He died on May 14, 2019, after a long stay in a coma as a result of a postponed operation in 2019.

=== Family ===
Yuriy Bohutsky was married and had two daughters.

== Awards ==
- Order of St. Gregory the Great (Vatican City, December 11, 2001)
- Order of Merit (Ukraine) III Class
- Diploma of the Verkhovna Rada of Ukraine
- Laureate of the Gregory Skovoroda International Prize (2006)
