= Tetyana Berezhna (politician) =

Ukrainian politician (born 1989)

- Тетяна Бережна
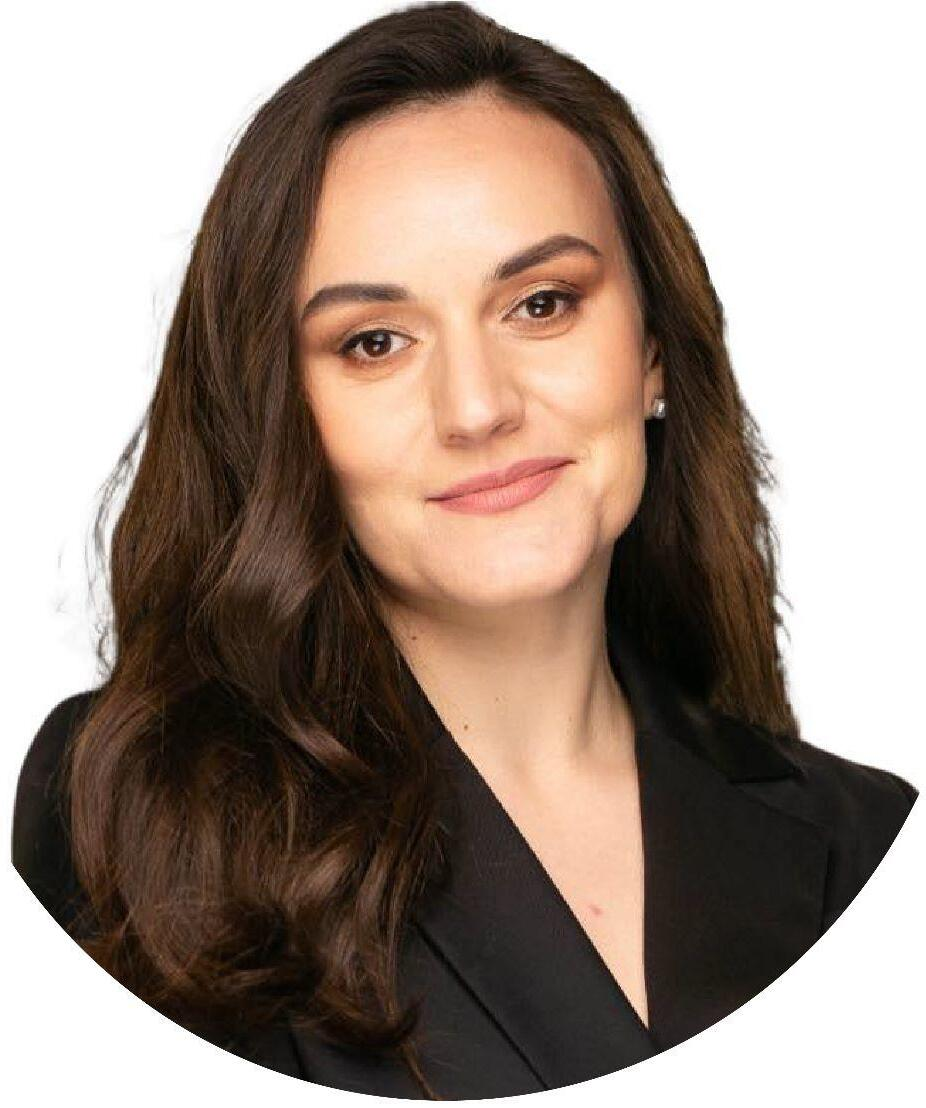
- Berezhna in 2023

Deputy Prime Minister for Humanitarian Policy Minister of Culture
- Incumbent
- Assumed office 21 October 2025
- President: Volodymyr Zelenskyy
- Prime Minister: Yulia Svyrydenko; Serhii Koretskyi
- Preceded by: Mykola Tochytskyi (as minister of culture)

Personal details
- Born: 9 January 1989 (age 37) Rohatyn, Ivano-Frankivsk Oblast, Ukrainian SSR, Soviet Union
- Party: Independent
- Education: National University of Kyiv-Mohyla Academy

Tetyana Vasylivna Berezhna (Ukrainian: Тетяна Василівна Бережна; born 9 January 1989) is a Ukrainian lawyer and politician serving as deputy prime minister for humanitarian policy and minister of culture since 2025. From 2022 to 2025, she served as deputy minister of economy.

== Early life ==
Berezhna was born Tetyana Matsyuk on 9 January 1989 in Rohatyn, which was part of the Ivano-Frankivsk Oblast in the Ukrainian SSR. In 2006, she started attending the National University of Kyiv-Mohyla Academy, which she graduated from in 2010 with a bachelor's degree. Two years later, from the same institute, she received her master's degree in law. She also participated in an internship at the Parliament of Canada as part of the Canada-Ukraine Parliamentary Program. She also started attending postgraduate courses at the London School of Economics and Political Science, at the Aspen Institute Kyiv, and then at the Kyiv School of Economics.

In 2011, she began work as a partner in the firm Vasil Kisil & Partners, specializating in taxes and corporate affairs. In 2017, she received a cerificate for the right to practice law.

== Political career ==
In June 2022, she left her job as a lawyer, and became the Deputy Economy Minister under Yulia Svyrydenko. In July 2025, she was named as Acting Minister of Culture after Mykola Tochytskyi was dismissed from the position after he dismissed Maksym Ostapenko. She was later in October confirmed as the new permanent Culture Minister, after the Verkhovna Rada approved her appointment with 266 votes in favor.
