= Marta Shpak =

Ukrainian singer

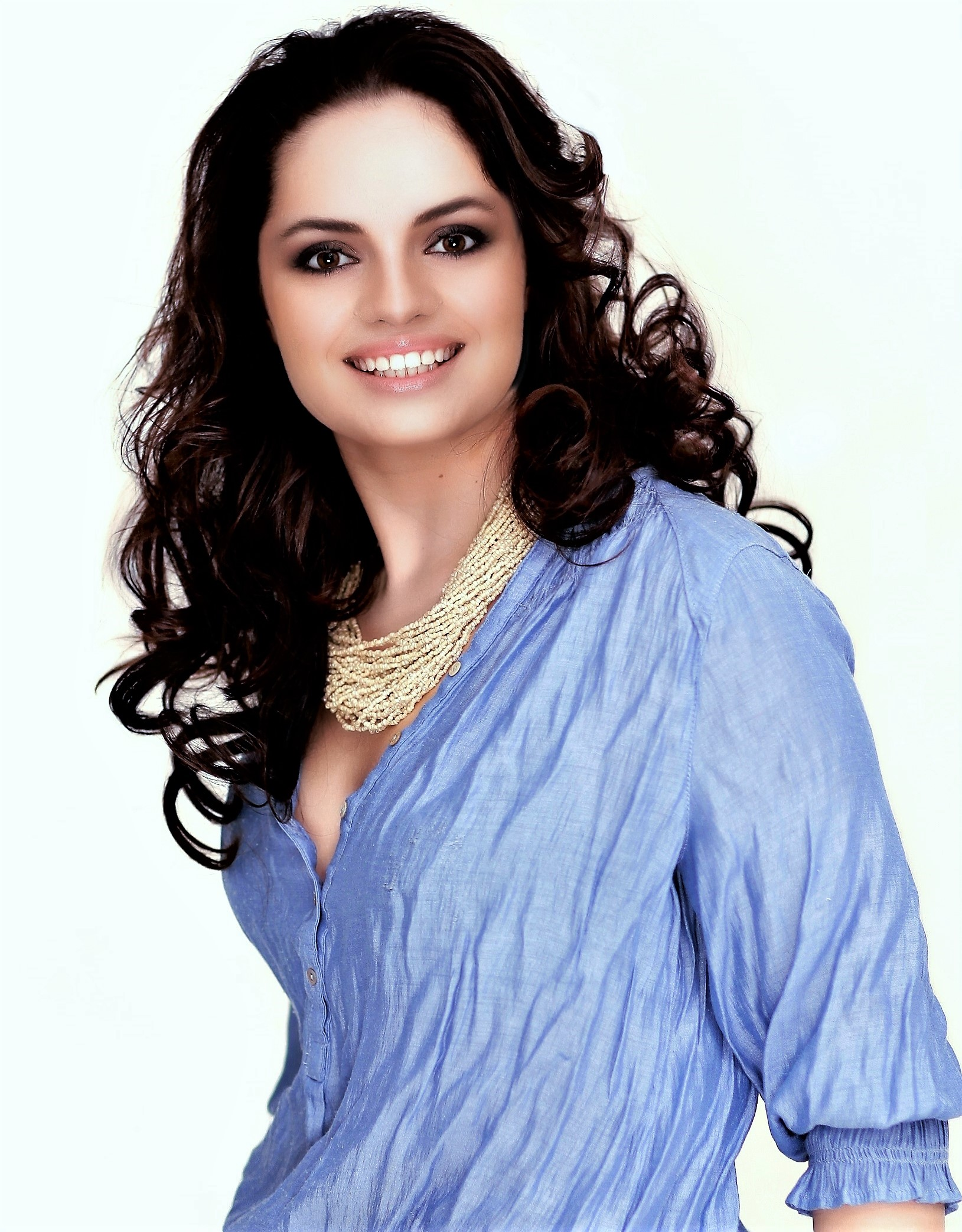

Background information
- Born: Марта Шпак; December 14
- Origin: Ukraine
- Genres: Pop; Folk pop; pop rock; world music; adult contemporary
- Occupations: Singer-songwriter; actress; musician; choreographer; writer
- Instruments: piano; vocal
- Years active: 1999–present
- Labels: Unsigned
- Website: martashpak.com

Marta Shpak (Марта Шпак) is a Ukrainian folk-pop singer, songwriter, actress, and choreographer. Shpak first started performing professionally at the age of five and has released five albums. She was named The Honored Artist of Ukraine in 2009 by President of Ukraine, in recognition of her dedication as the main soloist of the State Ensemble of songs and dance of the Ministry of Internal Affairs of Ukraine.

== Early life ==
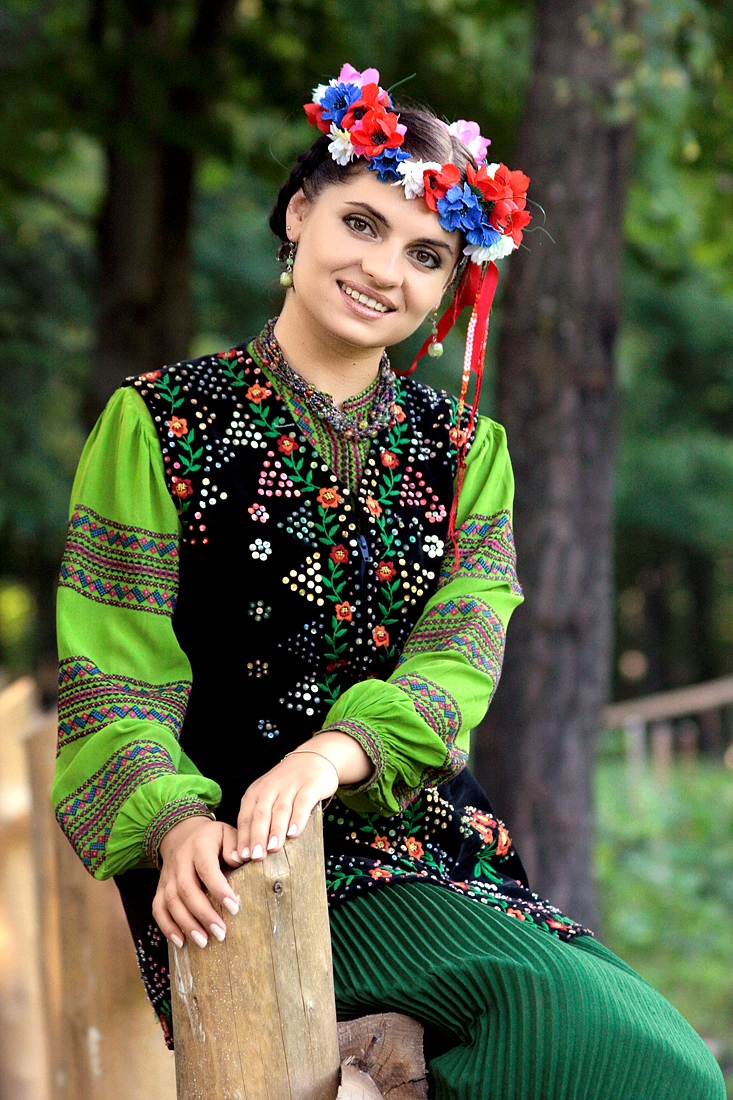
Marta Shpak in ancient costume of Boykivshchyna Ukraine

Marta Shpak was born in Perehinske (Ivano-Frankivsk region), Ukraine. Music was her main interest and hobby during her childhood. She attended the children's school of arts, tours with the folk ensemble "Malenki Boiky" (Маленькі бойки). Her mother Nataliya Shpak, played an important part in giving her music lessons and provided inspiration. At the age of 5, Marta and her sister Ann, first started performing and winning competitions at All-Ukrainian and International folk festivals.

== Career ==
In 1999 she entered the State College of Arts in Chernivtsi, where she studied Choreography and began her career as a solo singer, collaborating with composer and teacher of vocals Oksana Kyrylyuk. Her first studio tracks "Rainbow Paradise" and Bukovina were written by Valeriy Syrotiuk (Ukrainian priest) and became very popular in that region of Ukraine. From 2003 to 2008 Marta Shpak attended the National Academy of Government Managerial Staff of Culture and Arts in Kyiv where she obtained her master's degree in Modern choreography and Management of organizations and Performing Arts; become a Soloist/Singer of the State Ensemble of songs and dance of the Ministry of Internal Affairs of Ukraine and an Actress of the poetic theatre "Mushlya" ("The Shell", director – Sergiy Arkhypchuk). In 2019 Shpak became an MA candidate at York University, Toronto, Canada, working within Theatre and Performance Program at the Faculty of Fine Arts, TV and Media.

Marta Shpak holds a master's degree in Arts from York University Canada (Theater and Performance Studies Program; 2020; supervised by Magdalena Kazubowski) and a master's degree in Choreography and in Management from National Academy of Government Managerial Staff of Culture and Arts (Kyiv, Ukraine).

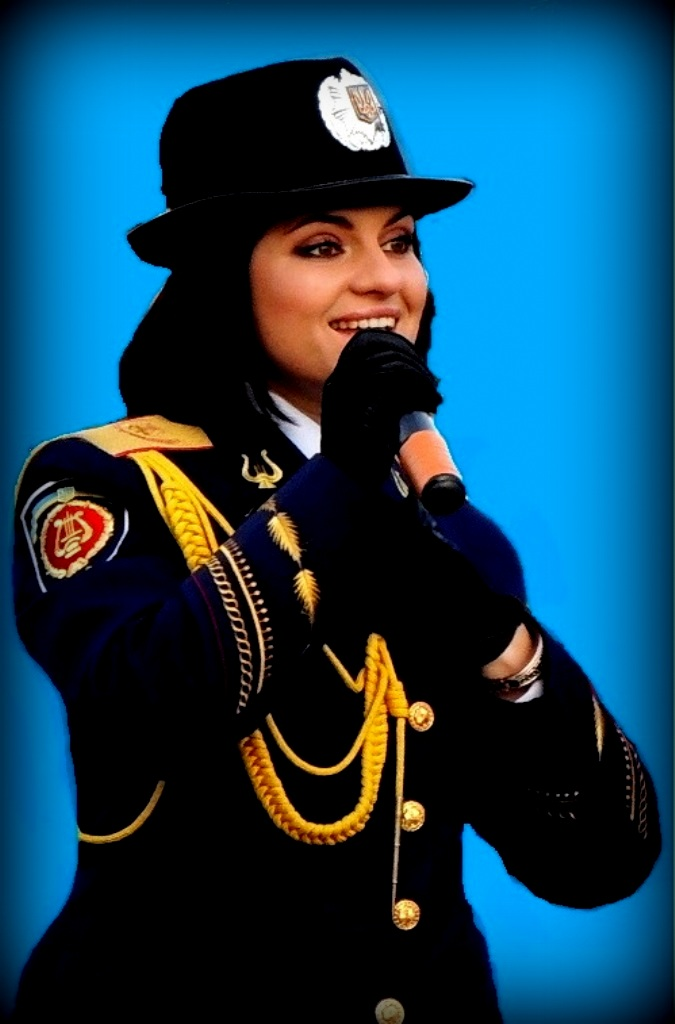
Marta Shpak – soloist of the State Ensemble of song and dance of Ministry of Internal Affairs of Ukraine

=== 2009–2014 ===
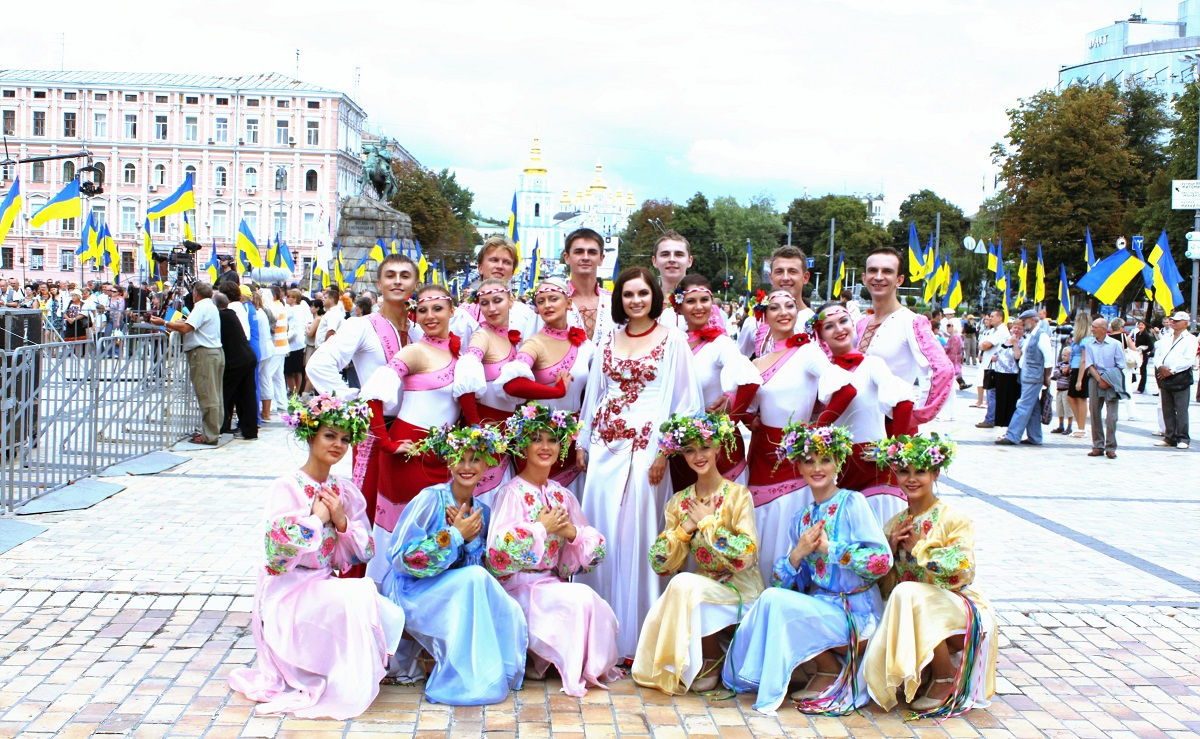
Marta Shpak with dance group of State Academic Ensemble of the Ministry of Internal Affairs of Ukraine

In 2009, Shpak was awarded the title The Honored National Artist of Ukraine by the President of Ukraine in recognition of her dedication as the main soloist of the State Ensemble of songs and dancing of the Ministry of Internal Affairs of Ukraine. 2009 also marked her first appearance in a music video "The Star in the Sky" which was directed by well-known Ukrainian film director Taras Khymych.

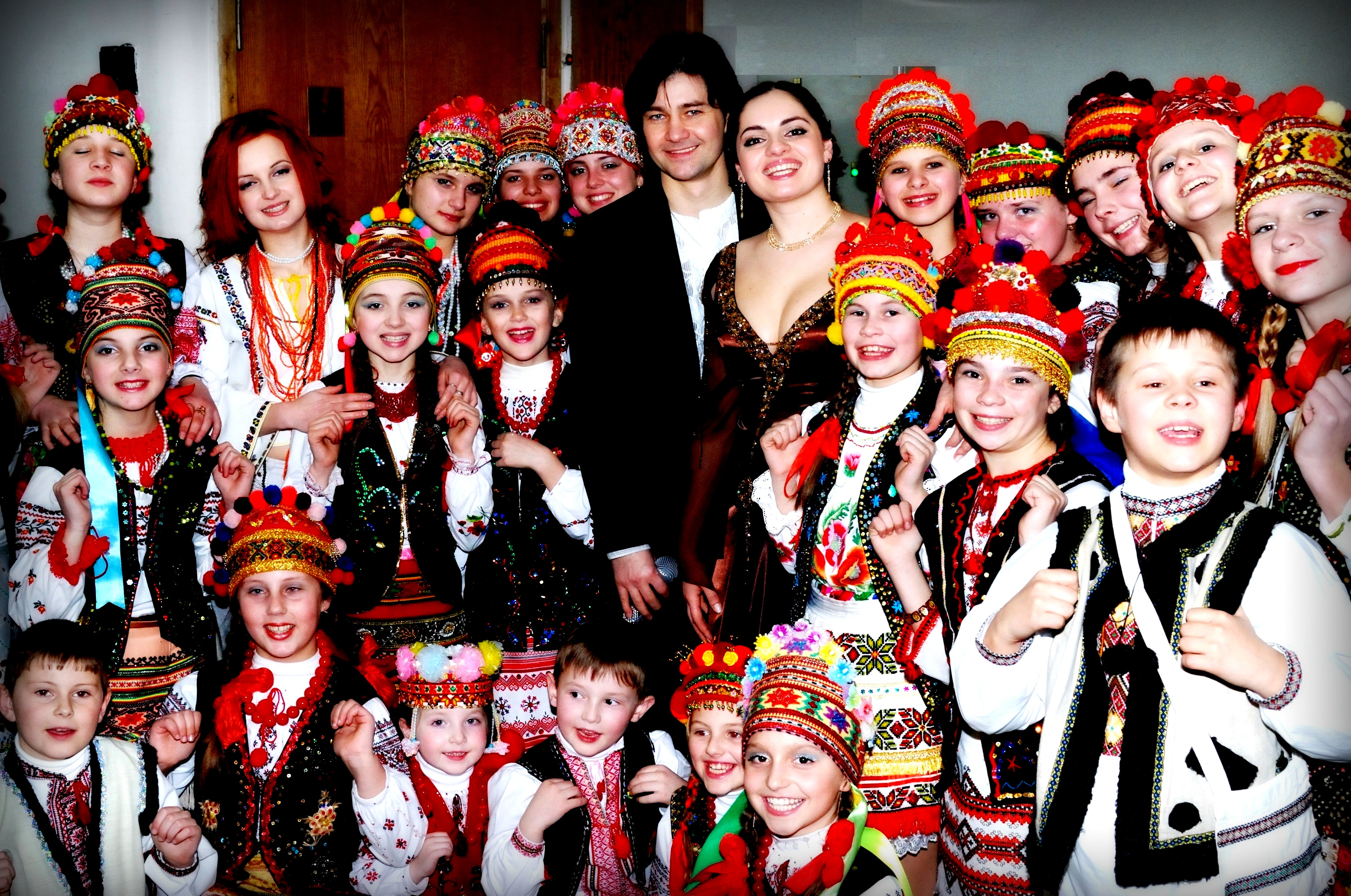
Marta Shpak with Malenki Boiky and Ievgen Nyshchuk at the Ostap Havrysh concert in Kyiv

In 2010, Shpak recorded an album with Ukrainian rock-band "S.K.Y" and recorded a music video singing a duet with the band's front-man Oleg Sobchuk for the song "Story".

In 2011, Shpak recorded an original musical project "Insurgent Tango" with the singer and author of this project Orest Cymbala and the academic instrumental ensemble "High Castle" (Lviv). All the songs are written by Olga Ilkiv.

In 2012, Shpak, along with children's folklore ensemble "Malenki Boiky" represented Ukraine with their performances at the Vatican, in honor of the Ukrainian Christmas tree at St. Peter's Square for Pope Benedict XVI. Shpak also performed in Moscow celebrating Ukraine's Day in Russia and the Anniversary of the birth of Ukrainian poet and Kobzar Taras Shevchenko.

In 2013, Shpak performed at the EuroMaidan in Kyiv in the first days of the Euro Revolution. In 2014, she performed at many Ukrainian meetings and concerts in Montreal, Toronto and Winnipeg. Her most recent supportive performances were at Toronto's Independence Day at Centennial Park and Multi-Cultural Pavilions during the Folkloramma Festival in Winnipeg, Manitoba. Shpak also performed for The League of Ukrainian Canadians in honour of their 65th Anniversary.

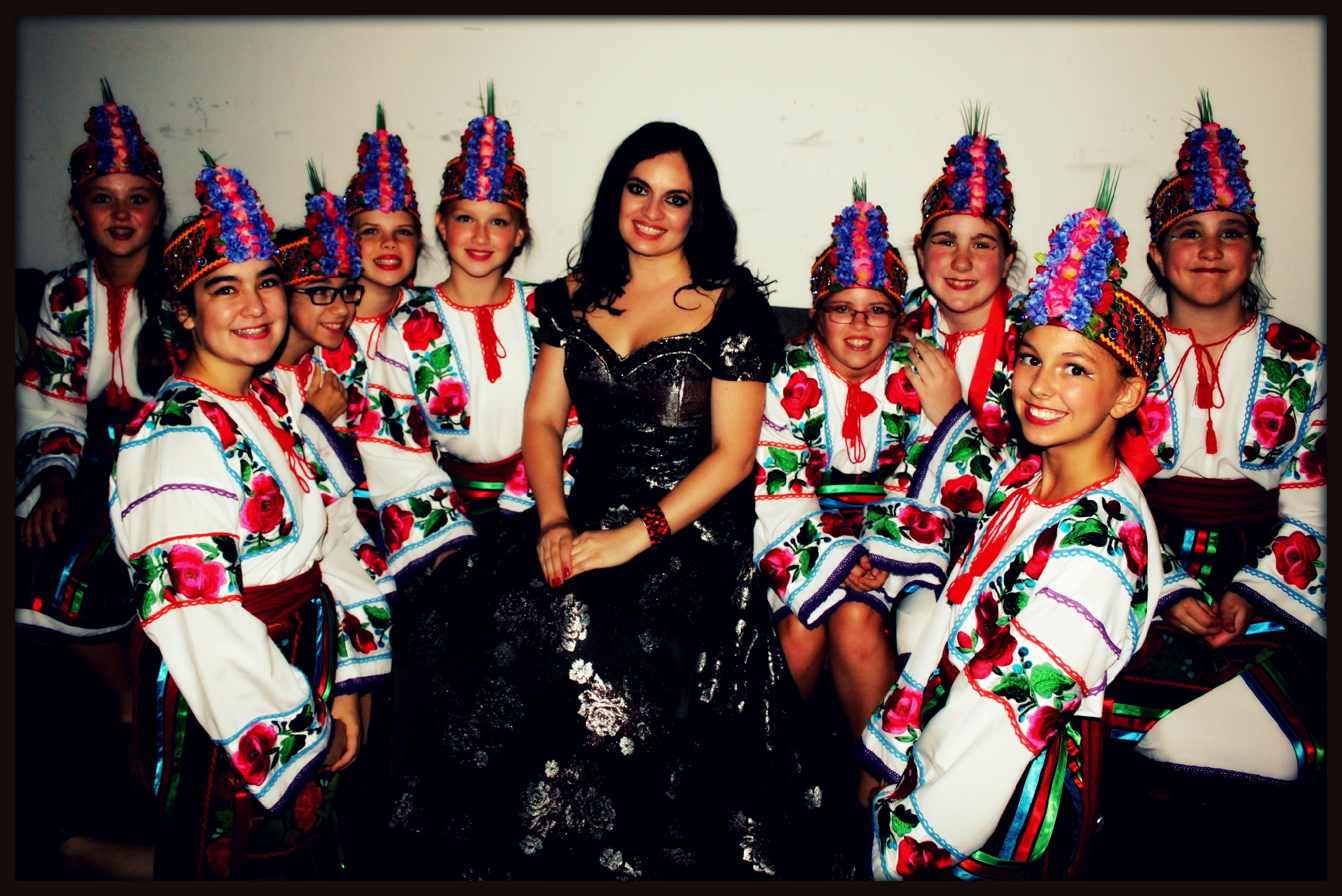
Marta Shpak at the Folklorama festival in Winnipeg presenting "Spirit of Ukraine Pavilion"

=== 2015–present ===
In 2015, Shpak began university studies in Canada. Shpak also began collaborating with Canadian multi-instrumental musician, songwriter and producer Denny DeMarchi. Marta Shpak performed at the Ukrainian festivals and fundraising music events in Canada.

In 2016, Shpak recorded and released the song with DeMarchi, "Zolota", dedicated to the 25th Anniversary of the Independence Day of Ukraine. In 2018, Shpak and DeMarchi released their debut music video “Christmas Day”, which was filmed in Canada and Ukraine by Francis Coral Mellon and Volodymyr Mussur.

=== Awards ===
- "The Song Premiere" 2008, Grand-Prix
- "Golden barn", 2007, Grand-Prix
- "Autumn Randewu", 2006, Grand-Prix
- "The West of 21 century", Grand-Prix
- "Volodymyr", 2004, Grand-Prix
- "On Svityaz waves", 2004, 2nd prize
- "Wesprem 2002", Hungary, 3rd prize
- "Kyiv Student Spring", 2006, 1st prize
- "The Song of Heart", 2001, 3rd prize
- "The Vernisage of Songs", 2001, 1st prize
- "The Ukrainian Family", 2004, 1st prize
- "The Ancient castle", 2000, 1st prize
- "The Morning sunrise", 1995, 3rd prize
- "The Fortune’s Nightingale",
- "Chernivtsi" 1995, 2nd prize in genres "author song" and "folk song"
- "The Singing Family", Kyiv 1995, 2nd prize

== Discography ==
- 2006 – "Enlighted’, Molotov 20, Marta Shpak & Sergiy Gera & RC "Atlantic"
- 2008 – "Na svitanku", Marta Shpak
- 2009 – "Songs of Boykivshchyna" (Бойківські співанки), Marta Shpak
- 2011 – "Insurgent Tango" (Повстанське танго) – Marta Shpak, Orest Tsymbala, Olga Ilkiv and "Vysokyy zamok" orchestra of Lviv Philharmonic led by Grammy winner Andriy Yatskiv.
- 2013 – "V nebi zironka" – Marta Shpak
- 2021 – "Leleka" – Marta Shpak. Best Songs
