= Andrey Karpenko =

Russian footballer

Personal information
- Full name: Andrey Ivanovich Karpenko
- Date of birth: 12 July 1966 (age 60)
- Place of birth: Balakovo, Russian SFSR
- Height: 1.80 m (5 ft 11 in)
- Position: Defender

Senior career*
Years	Team	Apps	(Gls)
1984	FC Znamya Truda Orekhovo-Zuyevo	10	(0)
1987	FC Volzhanin Kineshma	31	(0)
1988–1992	FC Fakel Voronezh	155	(2)
1993–1994	FC Tekstilshchik Kamyshin	22	(0)
1994–1996	FC Fakel Voronezh	74	(0)
1997–2000	FC Lokomotiv Liski	111	(0)
2001	FC Don Novomoskovsk	10	(0)
2002	FC Balakovo	10	(0)

Managerial career
- 2010–2013: FC Fakel Voronezh (administrator)
- * Club domestic league appearances and goals

Andrey Ivanovich Karpenko (Russian: Андрей Иванович Карпенко; born 12 July 1966) is a Russian professional association football functionary and a former player.
