= Alexey Karpenko =

Ukrainian psychophysiologist and biologist (born 1949)

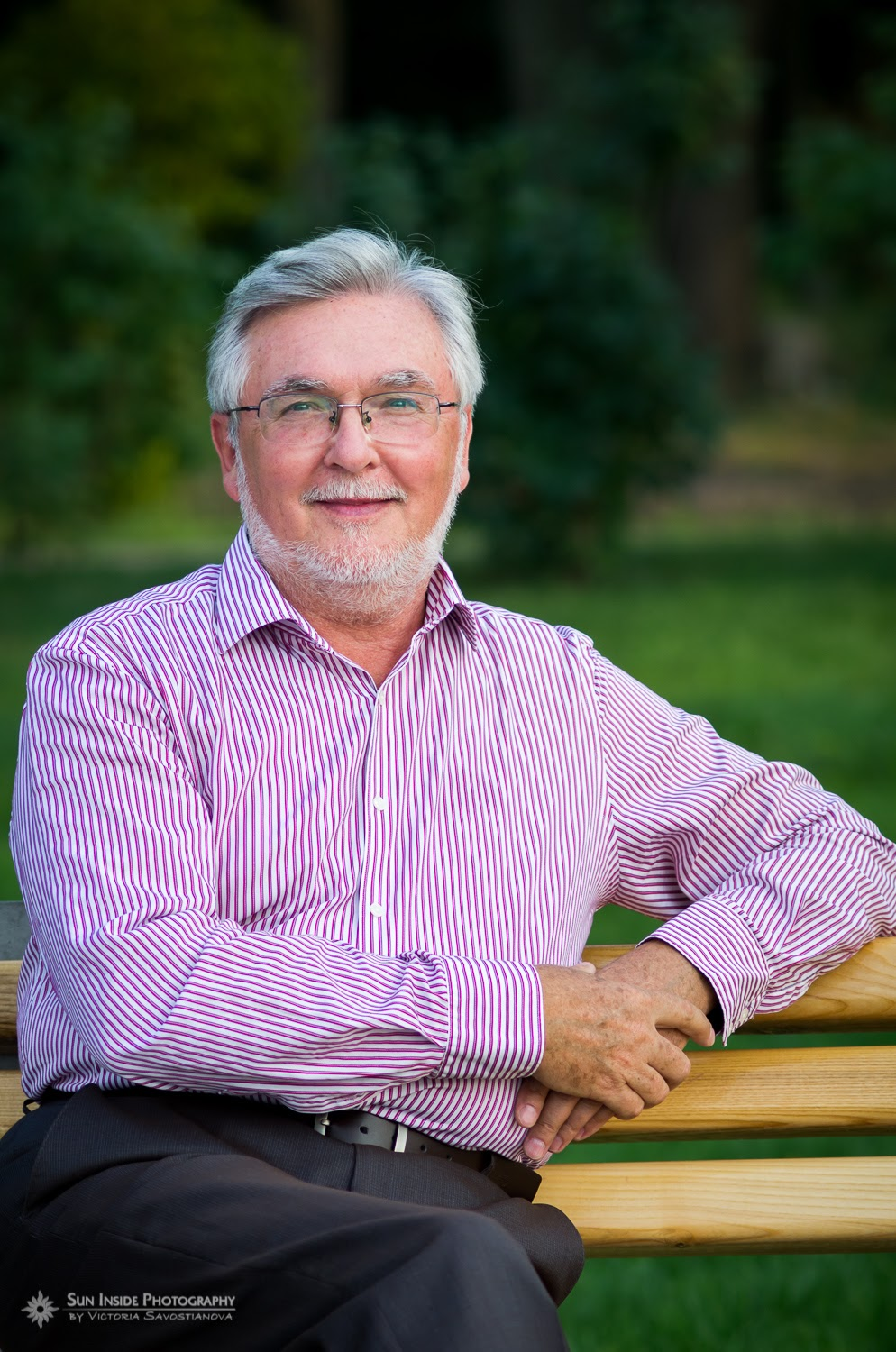
Alexey Karpenko, 2016

Dr. Alexey Karpenko (Ukrainian: Олексі́й Ві́кторович Карпе́нко, romanized: Oleksiy Viktorovych Karpenko; born 1949 in Ukraine) is a Ukrainian psychophysiologist and cell transplantologist.

== Biography ==
Karpenko graduated from high school in Donetsk, Ukraine (1966) and from Kyiv Medical University, Ukraine (1972) as a medical doctor, PhD (1977), Doctor of Sciences (1989).

He worked at the Institute for Occupational Health of Ukrainian Academy of Medical Science from 1972 until 1995 in scientific field of psychophysiology of mental labor. He created original methods, designed and implemented self-educating adaptive computer-based systems for individual psychophysiological monitoring and optimization of current professional reliability and mental capacity of operators at nuclear and heat power plants, major electric grids and cosmonautics.

From 1989 to 1995 he headed the scientific program for psychophysiological grounds of the professional reliability in operative personnel of the Ministry of Energetics of Ukraine. From 2002 to 2010 he participated in creation of branch legislation for implementation of psychophysiological systems which support professional reliability and high efficiency of operative personnel.

Together with Dr. Alexander Smikodub, Karpenko founded the Embryonic Tissue Center “EmCell” (1994) and was General Director (CEO) of “EmCell” during 1994-2001. In 1994, “EmCell” jointly with National Medical University and Administration of the city of Kyiv founded the world's first clinic totally dedicated to clinical application of fetal stem cell transplantations (Cell Therapy Clinic “EmCell”).

When Karpenko was CEO “EmCell” was granted letters of patent for new methods of treatment with the use of Fetal Stem Cell Transplantations by Ukraine, the US, Netherlands, Greece and Russia and took part in dozens of international congresses and conferences with contributions regarding clinical use of Fetal Stem Cell Transplantations.

Media paid attention to the pioneering work of "Emcell" with wide range of appreciation and critic.

At this time, Center "EmCell" in cooperation with six leading research institutes and universities of Ukraine developed legal grounds for practical clinical use of Fetal Stem Cell Transplantation, which were duly approved by Ministry of Health and by Academy of Medical Sciences of Ukraine (1999-2001).

In 2001, Alexey Karpenko left “EmCell” to create and to lead the Department for Fetal Stem Cell Transplantation at the Coordinating Center for Transplantation of Organs, Tissues and Cells of the Ministry of Health of Ukraine (2001-2003).

Starting from 2010, Dr. Alexey Karpenko is the Honorary Scientific Director of the Center “EmCell”.

External videos
- The EmCell Experience - The God Cells: A Fetal Stem Cell Journey on YouTube

Dr. Alexey Karpenko was featured in the American documentary “The God Cells: A Fetal Stem Cells Journey” (2017)

== Personal life ==
Karpenko's daughter is Ukrainian singer, composer and poet Olena Karpenko (stage-name Solomia, born 1981).
