= Vasyl Vovkun =

Ukrainian actor

- Василь Вовкун
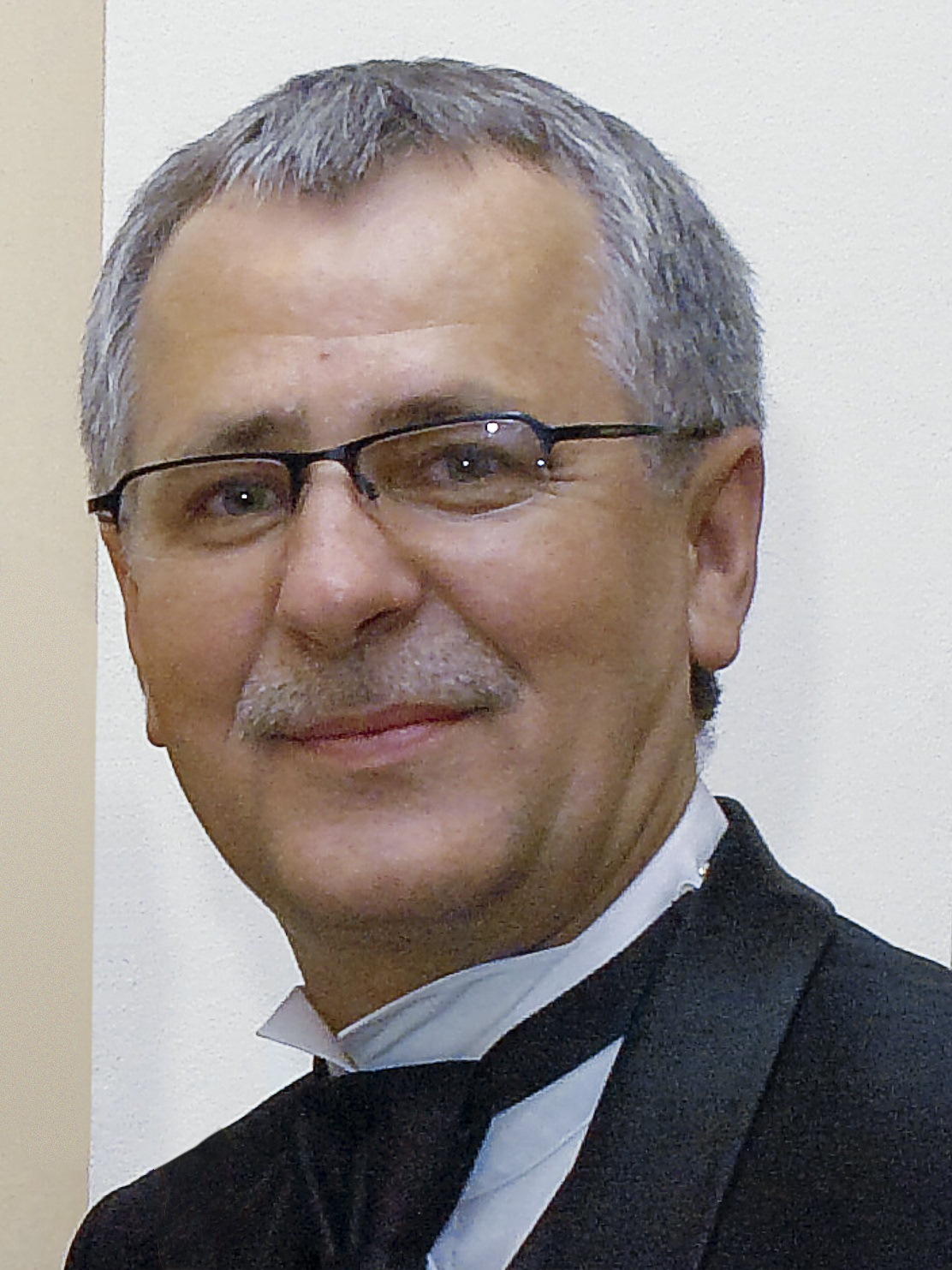
- Vovkun in 2007

Minister for Culture and Tourism of Ukraine
- In office 18 December 2007 – 11 March 2010
- Preceded by: Yuriy Bohutsky
- Succeeded by: Mykhailo Kulyniak

Personal details
- Born: 16 June 1957 (age 68) Matsoshyn, Lviv Oblast, Ukrainian SSR
- Party: Our Ukraine–People's Self-Defense Bloc
- Occupation: Theatre producer and scriptwriter

Vasyl Volodymyrovych Vovkun (Ukrainian: Василь Володимирович Вовкун; born 16 June 1957) was Minister for Culture and Tourism of Ukraine in the second Tymoshenko Government.

== Biography ==
Vovkun was born on 16 June 1957 in the village of Matsoshyn, which was then part of the Ukrainian SSR in the Soviet Union. In 1976, he graduated from the theatre arts studio at the Zankovetska Lviv State Academical Drama Theatre and also later the Karpenko-Kary Kyiv State Institute of Theatrical Arts in 1981.

From 1981 he performed on stage of the Chernivtsi Music and Drama Theatre and from 1989 until 1994 he was an actor at Kyiv studio-theatre "Budmo!". In 1994 he became production director of the Ukrainian State Centre of the Cultural Initiatives, which he did until 2003. He is also the Artistic Director of the Production Workshop "Artistic Agency Art Veles" from 1995 and from 2003 the General Producer of the Kyiv Festival (until 2004 – Britten Kyiv Festival). As a creative director, he participated in numerous Ukrainian festivals, which were marked by ritual-like productions like Oedipus Rex.

During his time as Minister of Culture, he extensively lamented that most of the budget for the ministry went to salaries and next to none of it went to development funding and instead the funding was being drastically cut. He proposed reforms to allow for culture to earn revenue such as tourism licensing, and proposed a Concept for the Development of Ukrainian Culture and Law on Protecting the Ukrainian Information Space. He was an advocate for mandatory Ukrainian dubbing of all foreign films, including Soviet ones, for which he was accused of "forced Ukrainization", which he rejected.

In 2017, he was appointed General and Artistic Director of the Lviv National Opera, which he won through a competitive selection process.
