= Olena Karpenko =

Ukrainian singer, composer and poet

Solomia
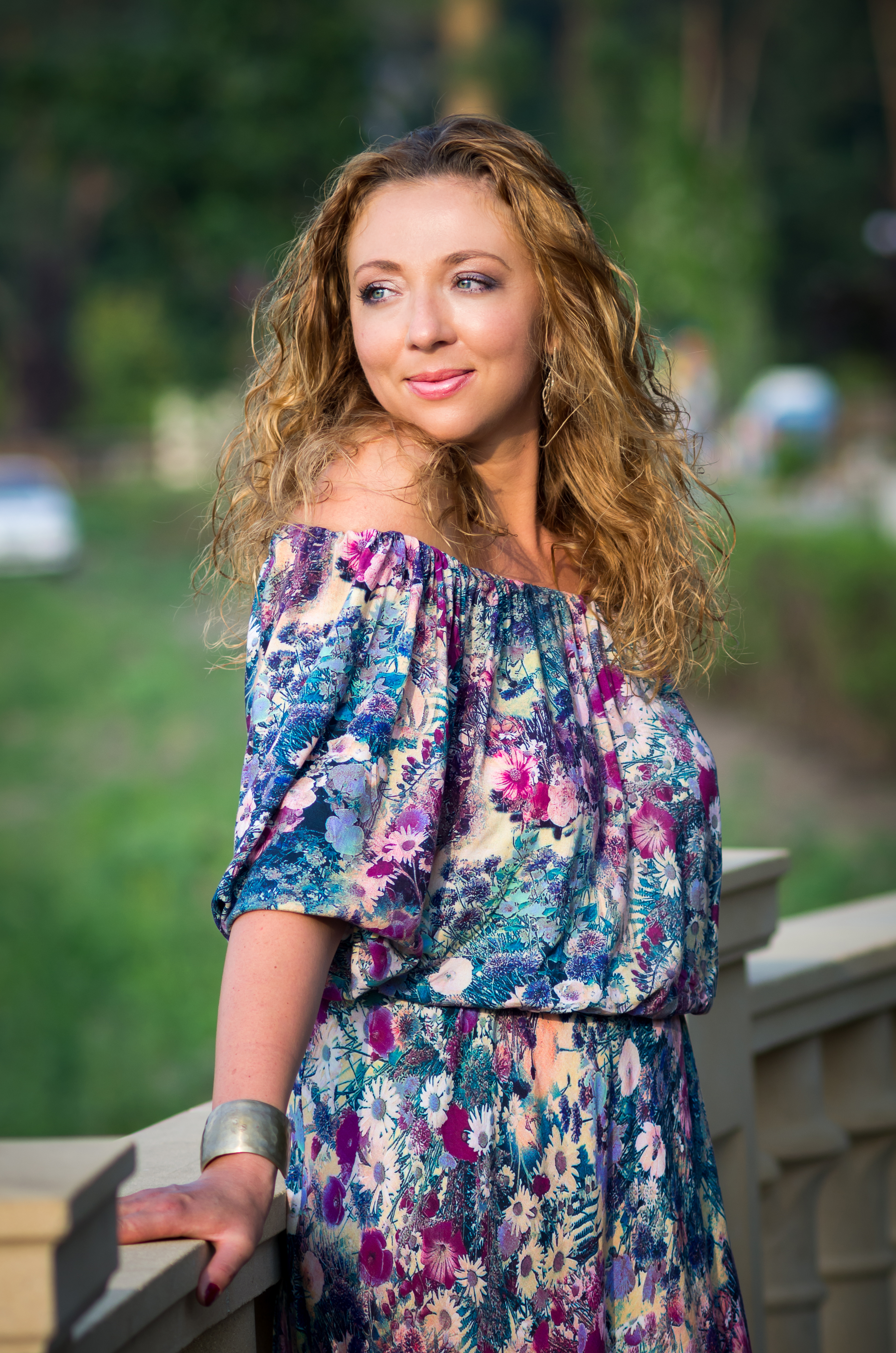
- Olena Karpenko, July 2016
- Born: Olena Oleksiyivna Karpenko; Kyiv, Soviet Union
- Occupation: Singer

Olena Oleksiyivna Karpenko (Ukrainian: Олена Олексіївна Карпенко; born in Kyiv, Ukraine) is a Ukrainian singer, composer, and poet with the stage-name Solomia. Olena composes in Ukrainian, English and Russian. She writes and performs jazz, blues, rock, pop, classics and world in Ukraine and abroad.

== Early life ==
Her father is Ukrainian psychophysiologist and cell transplantologist Alexey Karpenko.

Karpenko received her bachelor's degree in art studies (2002) and master's degree in journalism (2005) from the National University of Kyiv-Mohyla Academy. She studied vocals at the National Music Academy of Ukraine (2003–2007) under Galina Sukhorukova and Ludmila Garmash.

== Career ==
In 2011, when Ukraine celebrated the 20th Anniversary of Independence, Olena Karpenko was invited by the Head of the European Council to perform a solo concert in Strasbourg in front of the top-diplomats of Europe.

In 2015, Olena performed her "Oranta" as a signature song of the Ukrainian fashion show, held during New York Fashion Week.

Her "Mermaid" song (lyrics by Ukrainian poet Taras Shevchenko, music by Karpenko) was featured in S. Bihun's documentary Mother's Heart. Gongadze (2015).

Starting from 2015, Olena Karpenko has been a juror of the international literature contest Koronatsia Slova.

In 2016, she toured the US with a series of charity performances, all income of which was donated to help orphans of the war in Eastern Ukraine.

== Publications ==
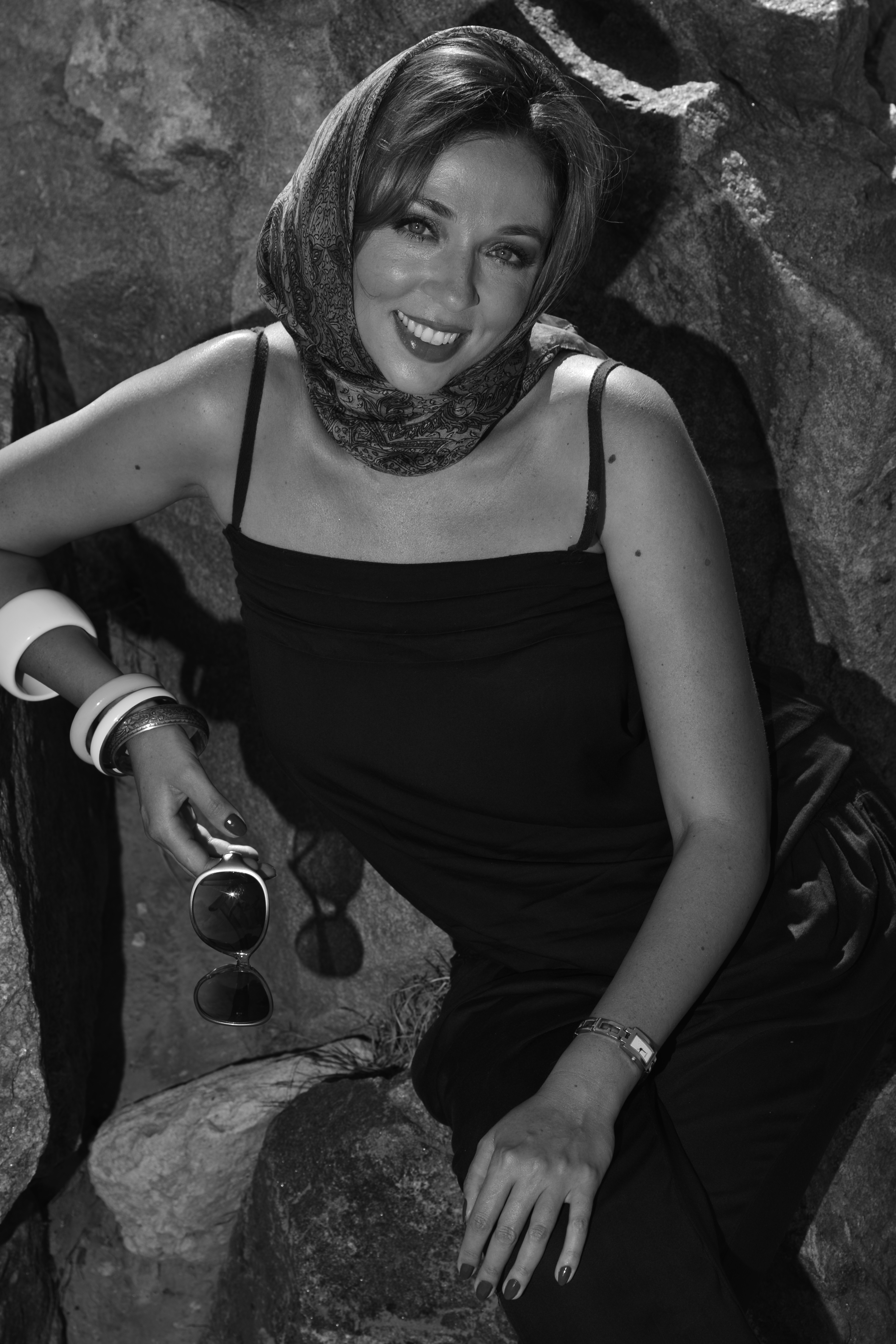
Olena Karpenko, August 2015

=== Books ===
- Touch (Kyiv, 1998) — poetry book
- Necklace (Kyiv, KM Academy, 2005) — poetry book
- Dialogues With The Silence (Kyiv, Dnipro, 2014) — poetry book
- Trojan Horses of TV Advertisement. Language Manipulations (Kyiv, Smoloskyp, 2007) — investigation on mind manipulation
- Angel's Schoolbook (Kyiv, Phoenix, 2016; Kyiv, Summit-Book, 2017) — novel
- The Sun Can't Provide A Half-Shine (2017)
- Heart of Europe (2017)
- Mint (2018),
- With Ukraine in the Heart (2018)
- Whisper (2018)
- Warm Stories About Kyiv (2018)
- Women's Breast: Passion And Pain (2019)

=== Publications in almanacs, anthologies, collections and albums ===
- 100 Young Poets Of Ukraine: Anthology (Kyiv, 2006)
- Creative Forces of Ukraine + (Kyiv, 2011)
- New Ukrainian Poetry (translated into Bulgarian, Sophia-Varna, 2012)
- Terra Poetica (translated into English, Kyiv, Summit-Book, 2014)
- 8 Women (Kyiv, Summit-Book, 2016)
- Terra Poetica — 2016 (Kyiv, Summit-Book, 2016)
- Raduga (translated into Russian, Kyiv, 2017)

== Discography ==
=== Solo albums (music and lyrics composed by Olena Karpenko) ===
- Solomia (Kyiv, 2007) — songs in English and Ukrainian
- Rondo (Kyiv, Atlantic Records, 2011) — songs in English and Ukrainian
- Birthday (Kyiv, Atlantic Records, 2011) — songs for children in Ukrainian
- Shadow (2019)
- Sky Flight (2019)

=== Singles ===
- "Carmen" (2019)
- "La Traviata" (2019)
- "Serenade" (2019)

=== Compilation CDs ===
- "Young Stars of Ukraine" (2005)
- "Just Talents" (USA, 2007)
- "Positive Music" (USA, 2007)

== Awards ==
Olena Karpenko is a winner and a laureate of a number of national, international and worldwide literature, vocals and composition contests. Just to name a few:

- Billboard World Song Contest (USA, 2007 and 2009)
- Song Of The Year (USA, 2007)
- Toronto Exclusive Magazine Awards (Canada, 2007)
- Smoloskyp (Ukraine, 2004 and 2006)
- Rukomeslo (Ukraine, 2005)
- ShevchenkoFest (Ukraine, 2007)
- Your Talents, Ukraine (1996) etc.
